= Battle of Volga River =

737 Umayyad victory over the Khazars

Battle of Volga River (737)
- Part of the Second Arab–Khazar War
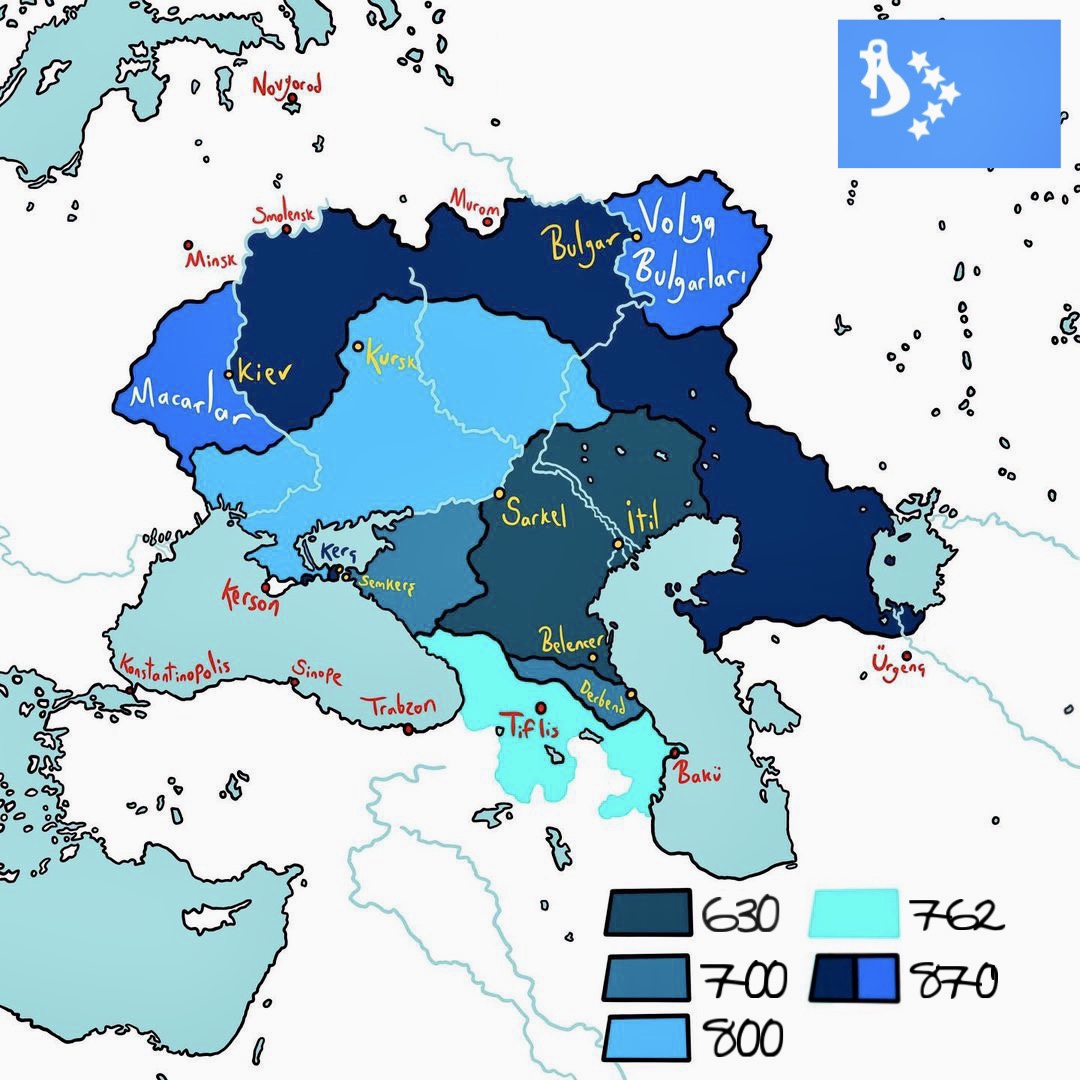
- location of Atil along Volga River
Date	737
Location	Volga near Atil
Result	Umayyad victory

Belligerents
Khazar Khaganate	Umayyad Caliphate

Commanders and leaders
Hazer Tarkhan †	Al-Kawthar ibn al-Aswad; Marwan ibn Muhammad

Strength
40,000 men	40,000 men

Casualties and losses
10,000 killed 7,000 captured	Unknown

The Battle of Volga River was a military engagement between the Umayyad Caliphate and the Khazar Khaganate at the Volga near Atil. The battle ended in a crushing Umayyad victory.

== Background ==
In the year 737, the Umayyad governor of Armenia, Marwan ibn Muhammad, launched an invasion into Khazaria. His forces crossed the Darial Gorge and reached Samandar. He had the Khazar ambassador imprisoned before he marched. When he reached there, he released him with a declaration of war. When the ambassador reached the Khagan, Marwan was already deep in enemy territory. From Samandar, the Umayyads reached Atil or Al-Bayda. The Khagan left a considerable force to defend the capital and withdrew north. The Umayyads did not attempt to besiege Atil and instead withdrew to the right bank of the Volga River. Meanwhile, the Khazar army under Hazer Tarkhan marched from Atil and followed the Umayyads on the opposite side of the river.

== Battle ==
Marwan appointed his general, al-Kawthar ibn al-Aswad al-Anbari, with a force of 40,000 men to cross the river and look out for enemy attacks and ambush them if found. At first, Al-Kawthar was reluctant but later managed to construct a pontoon bridge to cross the river. After they crossed, the Umayyads found a small party of Khazars, numbering 20 men, hunting. This small force was led by the Hazer Tarkhan himself. The Umayyads overwhelmed and killed them. Soon after in the evening, the Umayyads began constructing their camp. However, they saw smoke arise from the forest. It was the Khazar army encamped for the night. They were unaware of the Arabs nearby. Al-Kawthar quickly charged at the Khazar camp and took them by surprise. The Umayyads quickly triumphed, slaughtering 10,000 and capturing 7,000. The rest fled the battlefield.

== Aftermath ==
After the defeat of his forces, the Khagan sued for peace and possibly converted to Islam. Marwan sent two missionaries to teach the religion of Islam to him. Regardless of the reliability of the story, Marwan ended his campaign victoriously. Having captured 40,000 Khazar and Slavic captives, he settled them in Lakia. Many of them were Muslims and moved safely to Umayyad territory. Afterwards, warfare between the Umayyads and Khazars ceased, although hostilities were expected.

== Sources ==
- Dunlop, D. M (1954), The history of the Jewish Khazars.
- Artamonov, M. I. (1962). История хазар [History of the Khazars].
- Khalid Yahya Blankinship (1994), The End of the Jihâd State, The Reign of Hishām Ibn ʻAbd Al-Malik and the Collapse of the Umayyads.
