= Arab–Khazar wars =

Series of wars fought for control of the Caucasus

Arab–Khazar Wars
- Part of the early Muslim conquests
- Map of the Caucasus region c. 740, following the end of the Second Arab–Khazar War
Date	642–652 and 707–737 sporadic raids and clashes up until 764
Location	North and South Caucasus
Territorial changes	The Khazar-controlled portion of the South Caucasus is annexed, but the Arab advance into the North Caucasus proceeds no further than Derbent

Belligerents
642–661; Rashidun Caliphate; 661–750; Umayyad Caliphate; 750–764; Abbasid Caliphate	Khazar Khaganate

Commanders and leaders
Abd al-Rahman ibn Rabi'a †; Maslama ibn Abd al-Malik; al-Jarrah ibn Abdallah †; Salman ibn Rabi'a †; Sa'id ibn Amr al-Harashi; Marwan ibn Muhammad; Yazid al-Sulami	Barjik †; Bihar; Qaɣan Oɣlu † (Note: Not to be confused with Barjik, who had the same nickname. See Dunlop 1954, page 79 and V.Minorsky.); Alp Tarkhan †; Tar'mach; Hazer Tarkhan †; Ras Tarkhan; Bulchan

The Arab–Khazar wars were a series of conflicts fought between the Khazar Khaganate and successive Arab caliphates in the Caucasus region from c. 642 to 799 CE. Smaller native principalities were also involved in the conflict as vassals of the two empires. Historians usually distinguish two major periods of conflict, the First Arab–Khazar War (c. 642 – c. 652) and Second Arab–Khazar War (c. 722 – c. 737); the wars also involved sporadic raids and isolated clashes from the mid-seventh century to the end of the eighth century.

The wars were a result of attempts by the nascent Rashidun Caliphate to secure control of the South Caucasus (Transcaucasia) and North Caucasus, where the Khazars were already established since the late 6th century. The first Arab invasion began in 642 with the capture of the strategically important city of Derbent that guarded the eastern passage of the Caucasus along the Caspian Sea, and continued with a series of minor raids, ending with the defeat of a large Arab force led by Abd al-Rahman ibn Rabi'a outside the Khazar town of Balanjar in 652. Large-scale hostilities then ceased for several decades, apart from raids by the Khazars and North Caucasian Huns on the autonomous principalities of the South Caucasus during the 660s and 680s.

The conflict between the Khazars and the Arabs (now under the Umayyad Caliphate) resumed after 707 with occasional raids back and forth across the Caucasus Mountains, intensifying after 721 into a full-scale war. Led by the prominent generals al-Jarrah ibn Abdallah and Maslama ibn Abd al-Malik, the Arabs recaptured Derbent and the southern Khazar capital of Balanjar; these successes had little impact on the nomadic Khazars, however, who continued to launch devastating raids deep into the South Caucasus. In a major 730 invasion, the Khazars decisively defeated Umayyad forces at the Battle of Ardabil, killing al-Jarrah; in turn, they were defeated the following year and pushed back north. Maslama then recovered Derbent, which became a major Arab military outpost and colony, before he was replaced by Marwan ibn Muhammad (the future caliph Marwan II) in 732. A period of relatively localized warfare followed until 737, when Marwan led a massive expedition north to the Khazar capital Atil on the Volga Delta.

The 737 campaign marked the end of large-scale warfare between the two powers, establishing Derbent as the northernmost outpost of the Muslim world and securing Muslim dominance of the South Caucasus, but leaving the North Caucasus in Khazar hands. At the same time, continuing warfare weakened the Umayyad army and contributed to the fall of the Umayyad dynasty in 750, as a result of the Abbasid Revolution that established the Abbasid Caliphate. Relations between the Muslims of the Caucasus and the Khazars remained largely peaceful thereafter, and the Caucasus became an avenue of trade linking the Middle East to Eastern Europe. The resulting peace was interrupted by two Khazar raids in the 760s and 799 after failed efforts to secure an alliance through marriage between the Arab governors (or local princes) of the Caucasus and the Khazar khagan. Occasional warfare between the Khazars and the Muslim principalities of the Caucasus continued until the collapse of the Khazar state in the late 10th century, but it never again matched the intensity and scale of the eighth-century war.

== Background and motives ==
=== The Caucasus as a frontier of civilizations ===
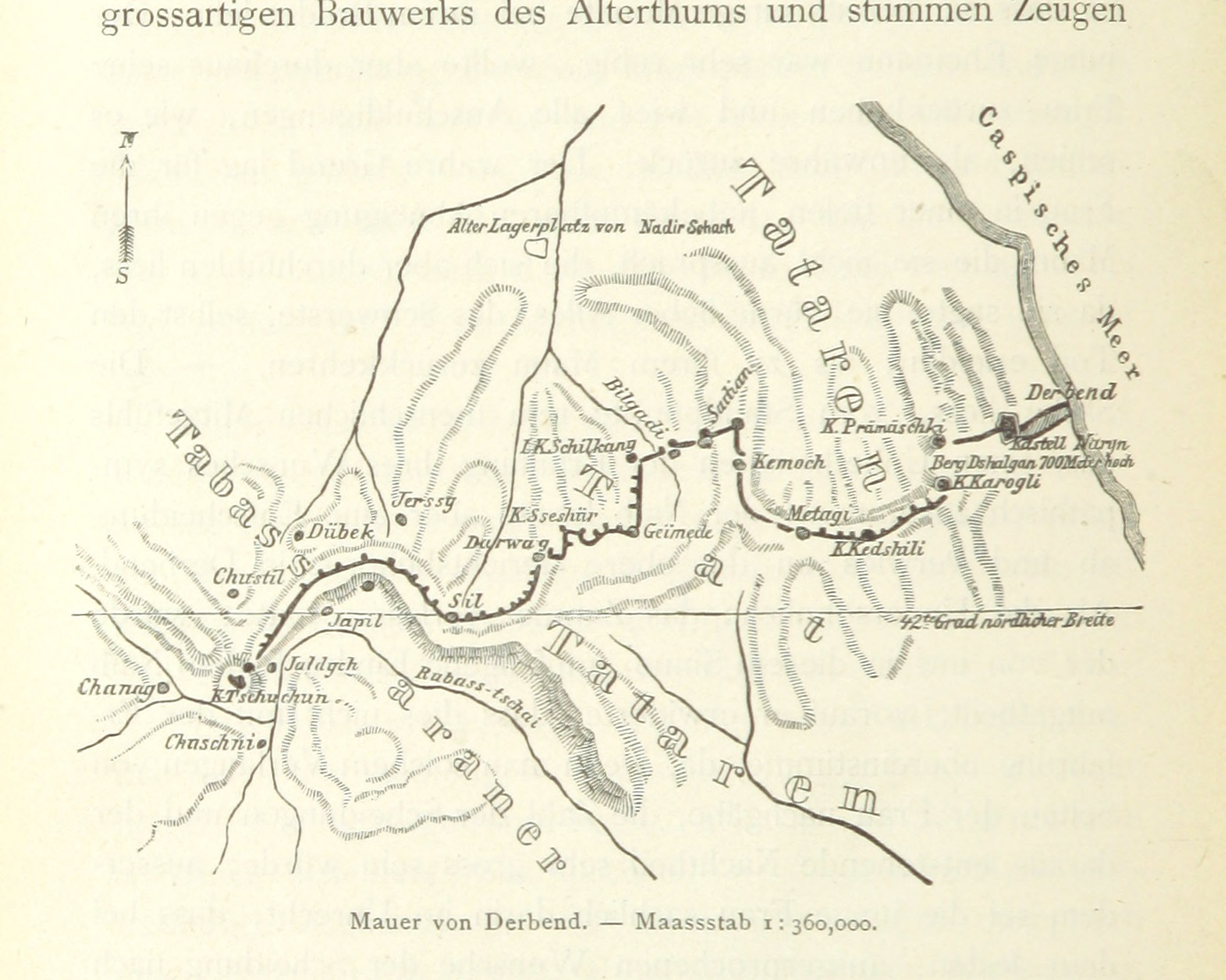
Roderich von Erckert's 1887 map of the Sasanian Persian fortifications of the Caspian Gates at Derbent

The Arab–Khazar wars were part of a long series of military conflicts between the nomadic peoples of the Pontic–Caspian steppe and the more settled regions south of the Caucasus. The two primary routes over the mountains, the Darial Pass (Alan Gates) in the centre and the Pass of Derbent (Caspian Gates) in the east along the Caspian Sea, have been used as invasion routes since classical antiquity. Consequently, defence of the Caucasus frontier against destructive raids by steppe peoples such as the Scythians and Huns came to be regarded as one of the chief duties of imperial regimes of the Near East. This is reflected in the popular belief in ancient and medieval Middle Eastern cultures that Alexander the Great had barred the Caucasus with divine assistance against the mythical hordes of Gog and Magog. According to historian Gerald Mako, the latter were stereotypical "northern barbarians" as conceived by the settled civilizations of Eurasia: "uncivilized savages who drank blood, who ate children, and whose greed and bestiality knew no limits". If Alexander's barrier failed and Gog and Magog broke through, the Apocalypse would follow.

Starting with Peroz I (r. 457–484), the shahs of the Sasanian Empire built a line of stone fortifications to protect the vulnerable frontier on the Caspian shore. When completed under Khosrow I (r. 531–579), these stretched over 45 kilometres (28 mi) from the eastern foothills of the Caucasus to the Caspian Sea. The fortress of Derbent was the strategically crucial centre point of this fortification complex, as seen in its Persian name Dar-band (lit. 'Knot of the Gates'). The Turkic Khazars appeared in the area of present-day Dagestan in the second half of the sixth century, initially as subjects of the First Turkic Khaganate. After the latter's collapse, they emerged as an independent, dominant power in the northern Caucasus by the seventh century. As the most recent steppe power in the region, early medieval writers came to identify the Khazars with Gog and Magog and the Sasanian fortifications at Derbent as Alexander's wall.

The Khazars are mentioned in medieval histories as being present in the Caucasus since the first centuries CE, but these are rejected as anachronistic by modern scholars. Some scholars have argued the Khazars must be identified with Turks who raided Sasanian Persia in the late 6th century, but again the evidence is unreliable, being derived from much later Arabic sources. Modern scholarship generally holds that the Khazars first campaigned in the South Caucasus during the Byzantine–Sasanian War of 602–628, as subjects of the Western Turkic Khaganate, who allied with the Byzantine Empire in the Third Perso-Turkic War. The Turks sacked Derbent in 627, broke through the local Sasanian defences, and joined the Byzantines in their siege of Tiflis. When Byzantine emperor Heraclius (r. 602–641) invaded Persia proper the next year, 40,000 Turks joined him. Their contribution was decisive for ending the war in a Byzantine victory.

For a short while afterwards, as Sasanian power collapsed, the Turks exercised some control over Caucasian Iberia (approximately present-day Georgia), Caucasian Albania (the modern Republic of Azerbaijan) and Adharbayjan (modern Iranian Azerbaijan), while Armenia, the southwestern half of the South Caucasus, was in Byzantine hands. However, after the assassination of Tong Yabghu, the Western Turkic khagan, around 630, the extension of Turkic control into the South Caucasus was abandoned, and the region returned to Sasanian influence by 632. The collapse of the West Turkic Khaganate led to the independence of the Khazars, then living in the Middle Volga region, and their emergence as an imperial power in their own right between the 660s and 680s, when they defeated Old Great Bulgaria and expanded into the North Caucasus.

=== Opposing armies ===
In the Caucasus, the Khazars came into contact with the nascent Arab caliphate, which had extended its power over the South Caucasus in the 640s, after the first wave of the early Muslim conquests. The eastern Caucasus became the main theatre of the Arab–Khazar conflict, with the Arab armies aiming to gain control of Derbent (Arabic Bab al-Abwab, 'Gate of Gates') and the Khazar cities of Balanjar and Samandar. Their locations have yet to be established with certainty by modern researchers, but both cities are referred to as Khazar capitals by Arab writers and may have been winter and summer capitals, respectively. Due to Arab attacks, the Khazars later moved their capital further north to Atil (Arabic al-Bayda) in the Volga Delta.

==== Arabs ====
Like other Near Eastern peoples, the Arabs were familiar with the legend of Gog and Magog, who appear in the Quran in the Arabicized form Yaʾjuj wa-Maʾjuj. After the Muslim conquests of the 7th and 8th centuries, their perceptions incorporated many of the cultural concepts of their new subjects. This was reflected in early Muslim geographic works, where the Caucasus was seen as part of a great continuous mountain chain that spanned the earth and divided the civilized lands of the south from the 'Land of Darkness' beyond, an idea deriving from Persian and possibly ancient Babylonian traditions. Consequently, according to Mako, the caliphs soon adopted the notion that it was their duty "to protect the settled, i.e. the civilized world from the northern barbarian". This imperative was reinforced by the Muslim division of the world into the House of Islam (Dar al-Islam) and the House of War (Dar al-Harb), to which the Tengric pagan Turkic steppe peoples such as the Khazars were consigned. (Note: For more details, see Albrecht 2016 and the literature referenced there.)

While their Byzantine and Sasanian predecessors simply sought to contain the steppe peoples through fortifications and political alliances, historian David Wasserstein notes the leaders of the Arab caliphate were "expansionists interested in conquest"; their northward thrust threatened the survival of the Khazars as an independent polity. Historian Khalid Yahya Blankinship agrees, emphasizing the highly ideological nature of the Muslim caliphate and its dedication to the doctrine of jihad, which in political terms entailed "the struggle to establish God's rule in the earth through a continuous military effort against the non-Muslims". The early Muslim state was geared toward expansion, with all able-bodied adult male Muslims subject to conscription. Its manpower pool was accordingly enormous and historian Hugh N. Kennedy estimates 250,000 to 300,000 men were inscribed as potential soldiers (muqatila) in the provincial army registers c. 700. Kennedy stresses that this force was spread throughout the empire and many of the muqatila proved loath to answer summons if the prospects for an easy victory and plunder were low, but on the other hand, these numbers could be supplemented by unregistered Arab volunteers. This put the Arabs at a distinct advantage over their enemies: the entire nominal strength of the contemporary Byzantine army is estimated at 120,000 men, though revisionist historians put it at as low as 30,000.

Arab armies of the early Muslim conquests contained sizeable contingents of light and heavy cavalry, but relied primarily on their infantry. Arab cavalry was often limited to skirmishing early in a battle before dismounting and fighting on foot. Arab armies resisted cavalry charges by digging trenches and forming a spear wall behind them. This tactic indicates the discipline of Arab armies, particularly the elite Syrian troops, which in the Umayyad period served continuously rather than being called up for specific campaigns, and were a de facto professional, standing army. According to Kennedy, the Arabs' higher degree of training and discipline gave them an advantage against nomadic peoples like the Khazars.

In the 8th century, Arab armies were often accompanied by local forces provided by the various local potentates, who not only were under Arab suzerainty, but often enough had suffered themselves due to Khazar raids. Thus in 732 the presiding prince of Armenia, Ashot III Bagratuni, is known to have renewed an agreement for the employment of Armenian cavalry with the Arab army for three years, in exchange for 100,000 silver dirhams per year. (Note: For comparison, a hundred dirhams was the standard monthly salary of the elite Syrian soldiery in the Umayyad period.)

==== Khazars ====
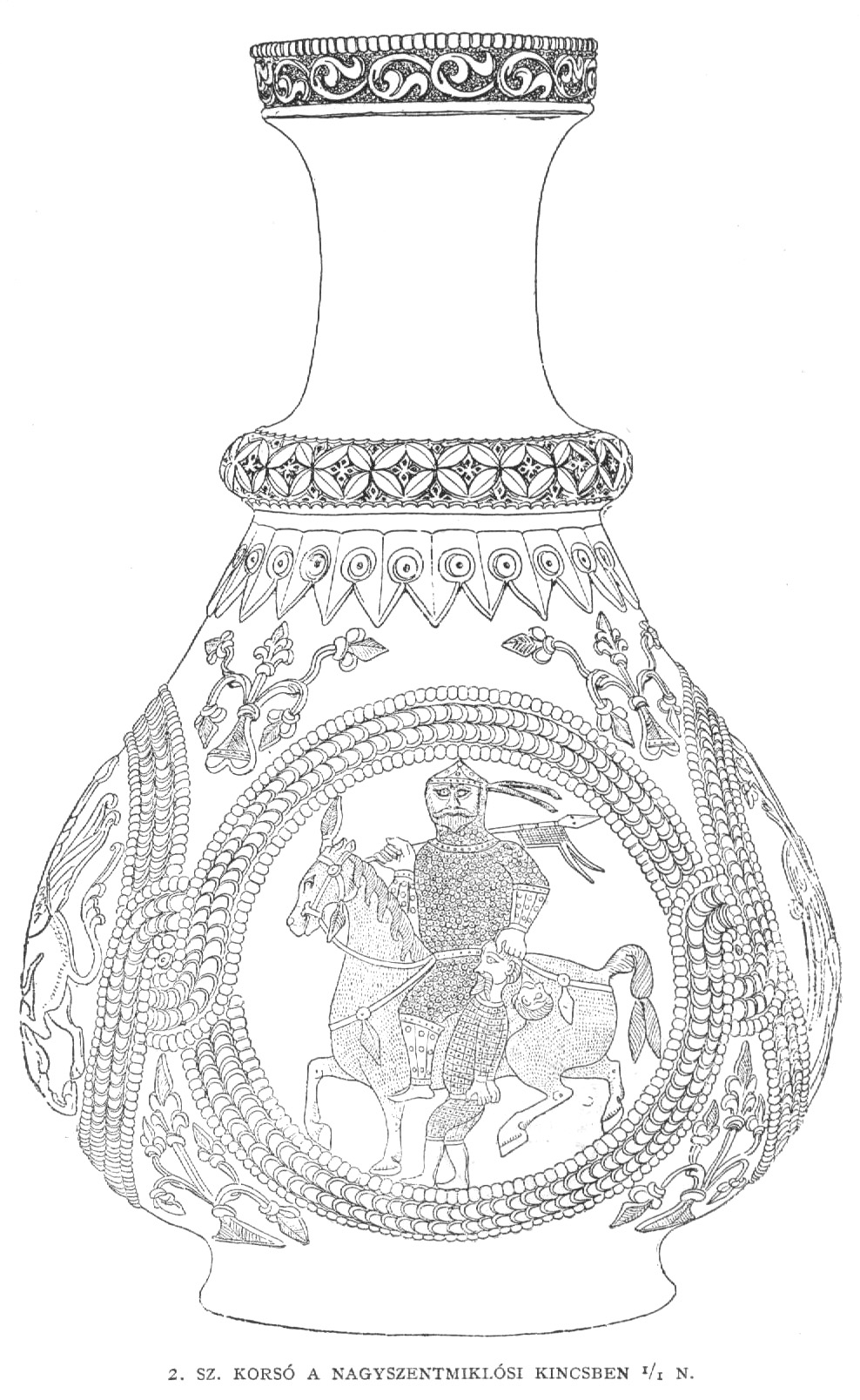
Ewer from the Treasure of Nagyszentmiklós, showing an early medieval armoured steppe warrior with a captive

The Khazars followed a strategy common to their nomadic predecessors; their raids might reach deep into the South Caucasus, Mesopotamia and Anatolia, but they were, according to historian Peter B. Golden, not aimed at conquest. Instead, Golden notes they were "typical of nomads testing the defenses of their sedentary neighbors" and a means of gathering booty, the acquisition and distribution of which was fundamental to tribal coalitions. According to Golden, the strategic stake of the conflict for the Khazars was control of the Caucasus passes. According to historian Boris Zhivkov, on the other hand, the Khazars contested the extension of Arab rule over Albania. Zhivkov considers that the Khazars laid special claim to the province, based on the ephemeral control exercised there by the Western Turks after the last Byzantine–Sasanian war.

The sources do not provide details of the composition or tactics of Khazar armies, and the names of Khazar commanders are rarely recorded. Although the Khazars adopted elements of the civilizations to their south and possessed towns, they remained a tribal, semi-nomadic power. Like other steppe societies originating in Central Asia, they practised a mobile form of warfare and relied on skilled, hardy cavalry. The rapid movements and sudden attacks and counterattacks of the Khazar cavalry are emphasized in medieval sources. In the few detailed descriptions of pitched battles, the Khazar cavalry launch the opening attacks. Heavy (cataphract) cavalry is not recorded in the sources, but archaeological evidence attests to the use of heavy armour for riders and (possibly) horses. The presence of Khazar infantry must be assumed (especially during siege operations), although it is also not explicitly mentioned. Modern historians point to the use of advanced siege machines as evidence that Khazar military sophistication was equal to that of other contemporary armies. The less-rigidly organized, semi-nomadic nature of the Khazar state also worked to their advantage against the Arabs, as they lacked a permanent administrative centre, whose loss would paralyze the government and force them to surrender.

The Khazar army was composed of Khazar troops and those of vassal princes and allies. Its overall size is unclear, and references to 300,000 men in the invasion of 730 are clearly exaggerated. Historian Igor Semyonov observes the Khazars "never entered into battle without having a numerical advantage" over their Arab opponents, which often forced the latter to withdraw. According to Semyonov, this attests to the Khazars' skill in logistics and their ability to gather accurate information about their opponents' movements, the layout of the country, and the condition of roads.

=== Connection with the Arab–Byzantine conflict ===
To an extent, the Arab–Khazar wars were also linked to the long-lasting struggle of the Caliphate against the Byzantine Empire along the eastern fringes of Anatolia (a theatre of war which adjoined the Caucasus). The Byzantine emperors pursued close relations with the Khazars which amounted to an alliance for most of the period in question, including the marriage of emperor Justinian II (r. 685–695, 705–711) to Khazar princess Theodora in 705. The possibility of the Khazars linking with the Byzantines through Armenia was a grave threat to the Caliphate, especially given Armenia's proximity to the Umayyad Caliphate's metropolitan province of Syria. This did not materialize; Armenia was left largely quiet, with the Umayyads granting it wide-ranging autonomy and the Byzantines refraining from actively campaigning there. Given the common threat of Khazar raids, the Umayyads found the Armenians (and the neighbouring Georgians) willing allies against the Khazars.

The 20th-century Byzantinist Dimitri Obolensky suggested the Arab expansion in the Caucasus was motivated by a desire to outflank Byzantine defences from the north and envelop the Byzantine Empire in a pincer movement, but this idea is rejected as far-fetched by more recent scholars. Wasserstein objects to Obolensky's proposition as a scheme of extraordinary ambition which hinges on two untenable assumptions: that the Muslims had concluded a direct assault against Byzantium was without prospects of success, and that they had more detailed geographical knowledge than can be demonstrated for the time in question. Mako agrees that such a grand strategic plan is not borne out by the rather limited nature of the Arab–Khazar conflict until the 720s. It is more likely that the northward expansion of the Arabs beyond the Caucasus was, at least initially, the result of the onward momentum of the early Muslim conquests. Local Arab commanders of the period often exploited opportunities haphazardly and without an overall plan, sometimes pursuing expansion even against direct caliphal orders.

From a strategic perspective, it is more probable that the Byzantines encouraged the Khazars to attack the Caliphate to relieve mounting pressure on their eastern frontier in the early eighth century. Byzantium profited from the diversion of Muslim armies northwards during the 720s and 730s, and the Byzantine–Khazar entente resulted in another marriage alliance between future emperor Constantine V (r. 741–775) and Khazar princess Tzitzak in 733. (Note: According to Thomas S. Noonan, modern scholars have often overestimated the significance of this marriage. Noonan argues Byzantium was more hard-pressed by the Arab attacks than the Khazars, both sides could provide little tangible help to one another, and there is no evidence of further Byzantine–Khazar relations for half a century. Noonan calls the marriage "purely symbolic, a gesture of solidarity and no more".) Gaining control of the northern branch of the trade networks linking Europe with East Asia (the so-called "Silk Road") by the Caliphate has been suggested as a further motive for the conflict. Mako disputes this claim, pointing out that warfare declined precisely at the time of greatest expansion of these networks, after the mid-eighth century.

== First war and aftermath ==
=== First Arab invasions ===
The Umayyad Caliphate and its provinces (in green) at its greatest extent, c. 740

The Khazars and Arabs came into conflict as a result of the first phase of Muslim expansion; by 640, following their conquest of Byzantine Syria and Upper Mesopotamia, the Arabs had reached Armenia. Arabic and Armenian sources differ considerably on the details and chronology of the Arab conquest of Armenia, but by 655 the Armenian princes had capitulated, and both the Byzantine and Persian halves of Armenia were subjugated. Arab rule was overthrown during the First Muslim Civil War (656–661), but after its end the Armenian princes returned to their tributary status in the newly established Umayyad Caliphate. The Principality of Iberia concluded a similar treaty with the Arabs, and only Lazica (on the Black Sea coast) remained under Byzantine influence. Neighbouring Adharbayjan was conquered in 639–643; raids were launched into Arran (Caucasian Albania) under Salman ibn Rabi'a and Habib ibn Maslama during the early 640s, leading to the submission of its cities. As in Armenia, Arab rule was not securely established there until after the First Muslim Civil War.

According to Arab chroniclers, the first attack on Derbent was launched in 642 under Suraqa ibn Amr; (Note: Nothing else is known about Suraqa ibn Amr other than his overall command of the 642 Derbent campaign and that he shared the nickname 'Dhu al-Nur' (after his sword) with his deputy Abd al-Rahman ibn Rabi'a.) Abd al-Rahman ibn Rabi'a commanded his vanguard. Al-Tabari's History of the Prophets and Kings, written in the early 10th century, reports that Shahrbaraz, the Persian governor of Derbent, offered to surrender the fortress to the Arabs and aid them against the Caucasian peoples if he and his followers were relieved of the jizya, a poll tax imposed on non-Muslims. Shahrbaraz's proposal was accepted and ratified by Caliph Umar (r. 634–644). Al-Tabari reports the first Arab advance into Khazar lands occurred after the capture of Derbent. Abd al-Rahman ibn Rabi'a reached Balanjar with no losses, and his cavalry advanced up to 200 parasangs—about 800 kilometres (500 mi)—north, as far as al-Bayda on the Volga, the future Khazar capital. This dating, and the improbable claim that the Arabs suffered no casualties, have been disputed by modern scholars. Based at Derbent, Abd al-Rahman launched frequent raids against the Khazars and local tribes over the following years, but they were of small scale and no details about them are recorded in the sources.

Disregarding the caliph's instructions for caution and restraint, Abd al-Rahman or (according to Baladhuri and Ya'qubi) his brother Salman led a large army north in 652, aiming to take Balanjar. The town was besieged for several days, with both sides using catapults, until the arrival of a Khazar relief force and a sortie by the besieged forces ended in a decisive defeat for the Arabs. Abd al-Rahman and 4,000 of his troops were killed, and the rest fled to Derbent or Gilan in present-day northern Iran.

=== Khazar and Hunnic raids into the South Caucasus ===
Due to the First Muslim Civil War and priorities on other fronts, the Arabs did not attack the Khazars again until the early eighth century. Despite the re-establishment of Arab suzerainty after the end of the civil war, the tributary South Caucasus principalities were not yet firmly under Arab rule and their resistance (encouraged by Byzantium) could not be overcome. For several decades after the initial Arab conquest, considerable autonomy was left to local rulers; Arab governors worked with them, and they had small forces of their own. The Khazars refrained from large-scale interventions in the south; pleas for assistance by Yazdegerd III (r. 632–651), the last Sasanian shah, were unanswered. After the Arab attacks, the Khazars abandoned Balanjar and moved their capital further north in an attempt to evade the Arab armies. However, Khazar auxiliaries and Abkhazian and Alan troops are recorded fighting alongside the Byzantines against the Arabs in 655.

The only recorded hostilities in the second half of the 7th century were a few Khazar raids into the South Caucasus principalities that were loosely under Muslim dominion. These raids were primarily in search of plunder rather than attempts at conquest. In one such raid into Albania in 661–62, they were defeated by local prince Juansher (r. 637–669). A large-scale raid across the South Caucasus in 683 or 685 (also a time of civil war in the Muslim world) was more successful, capturing much booty and many prisoners and killing the presiding princes of Iberia (Adarnase II) and Armenia (Grigor I Mamikonian). At the same time, the North Caucasian Huns also launched attacks on Albania in 664 and 680. In the first incursion, Prince Juansher was obliged to marry the daughter of the Hunnic king. Modern scholars debate whether the Huns acted independently or as Khazar proxies, but several historians consider Hunnic ruler Alp Iluetuer a Khazar vassal; if so, Albania was under a form of indirect Khazar rule during the 680s. Umayyad caliph Mu'awiya I (r. 661–680) tried to counter Khazar influence by inviting Juansher to Damascus twice, and the 683/685 Khazar raid may have been a reaction to those invitations. According to historian Thomas S. Noonan, on the other hand, the "cautious nature of Khazar policy in the Southern Caucasus" made them avoid direct confrontation with the Umayyads and intervene only during times of civil war. Noonan argues this caution came about because the Khazars were themselves preoccupied with consolidating their rule of the Pontic–Caspian steppe and were satisfied with the "limited goal of bringing Albania into the Khazar sphere of influence".

== Second war ==
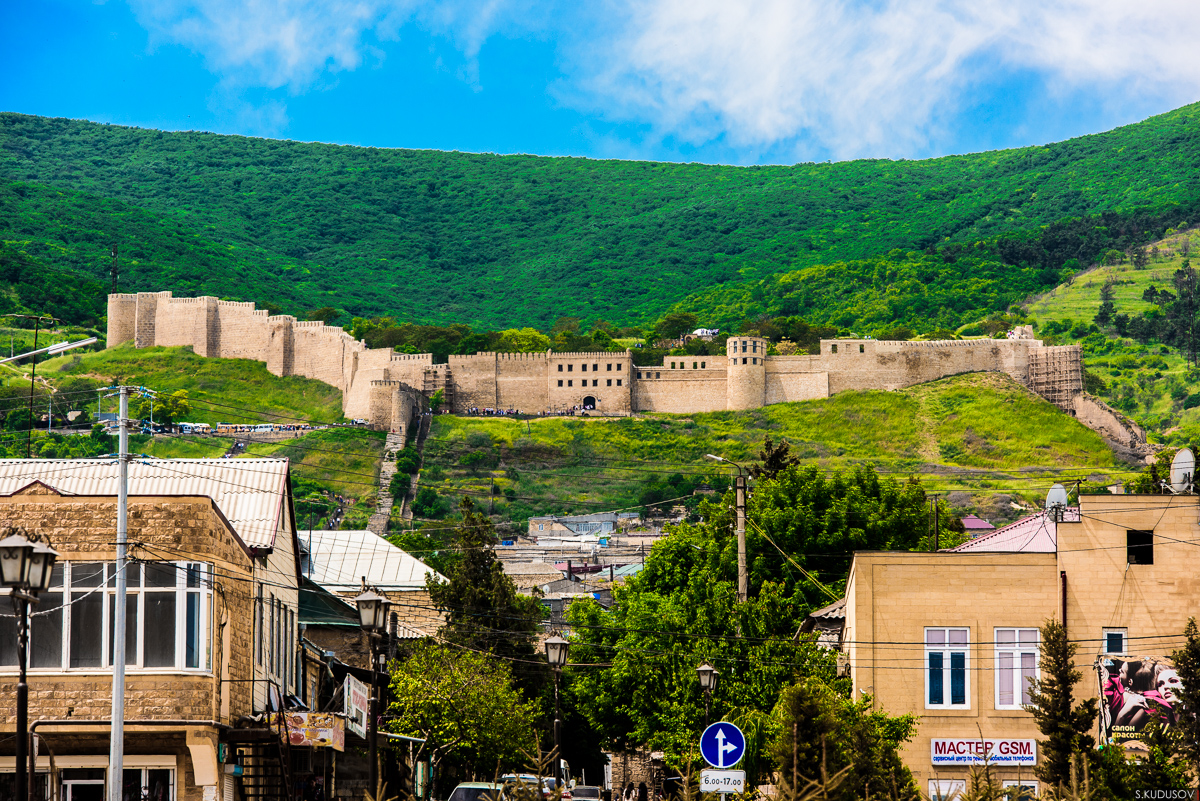
Naryn-Kala, the Sasanian-era citadel in Derbent

Relations between the two powers remained relatively quiet until the early eighth century, when the stage for a new and more intense round of conflict was set. At the turn of the century, Byzantine political authority was marginalized in the Caucasus: the civil war in the Caliphate ended in 693, and the Umayyads were able to inflict significant defeats on the Byzantines, who descended into a long period of turmoil. The Arabs began a sustained offensive against Byzantium that would eventually culminate in the great assault on the Byzantine capital Constantinople in 717–718. In the same period, the Caliphate tightened its grip on the Christian principalities of Transacaucasia. After the suppression of a large-scale Armenian rebellion in 705, Armenia, Iberia and Albania finally came under direct Arab rule as the province of Arminiya. Only the western South Caucasus (present-day Georgia) remained free from direct control by either of the two rival powers, who now confronted each other for control of the Caucasus.

The first Arab advance came as early as 692/93, with an expedition to secure the pass of Derbent; but Arab forces were soon forced to withdraw. The conflict resumed in 707 with a campaign by Umayyad general Maslama, son of Caliph Abd al-Malik (r. 685–705), in Adharbayjan and up to Derbent. Further attacks on Derbent are reported by different sources in 708 by Muhammad ibn Marwan, and the following year by Maslama, but the most likely date for Derbent's recovery by the Arabs is Maslama's 713/14 expedition.

Eighth-century Armenian historian Łewond reports Derbent was in the hands of the Huns at the time; the 16th-century chronicle Derbent-nameh says that it was defended by 3,000 Khazars, and Maslama captured it only after a resident showed him a secret underground passage. Łewond also says the Arabs, realizing that they could not hold the fortress, razed its walls. Maslama then drove deeper into Khazar territory, trying to subdue the North Caucasian Huns (who were Khazar vassals). The Khazar khagan confronted the Arabs at the city of Tarku, but apart from a series of single combats by champions, the two armies did not engage for several days. The imminent arrival of Khazar reinforcements under the general Alp' forced Maslama to quickly abandon his campaign and retreat to Iberia, leaving his camp with all its equipment behind as a ruse.

In response, in 709 or c. 715, the Khazars invaded and raided Albania with an army claimed to be 80,000 strong. In 717, the Khazars raided Adharbayjan in force. With most of the Umayyad army commanded by Maslama occupied at the siege of Constantinople, Caliph Umar II (r. 717–720) reportedly could only spare 4,000 men to confront 20,000 invaders. The Arab commander Hatim ibn al-Nu'man nevertheless defeated and drove back the Khazars. Hatim returned to the caliph with fifty Khazar prisoners, the first such event recorded in the sources.

=== Escalation of the conflict ===
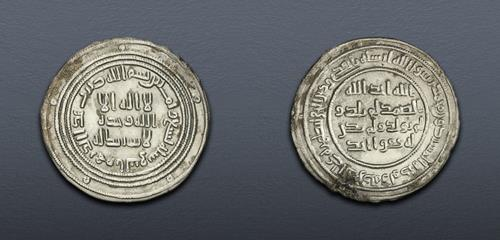
Silver dirham, minted 707/8, possibly in Arab-ruled Caucasian Albania

In 721/22, the main phase of the war began. Thirty thousand Khazars invaded Armenia that winter, and decisively defeated the mostly Syrian army of the local governor, (Note: The task of facing the Khazars during the Second Arab–Khazar War fell on the Umayyad governors of Arminiya and Adharbayjan, the two provinces being governed in tandem at the time and usually combined with the governorship of the Jazira province.) Ma'laq ibn Saffar al-Bahrani at Marj al-Hijara (Rocky Meadow) in February and March 722.

Caliph Yazid II (r. 720–724) sent North al-Jarrah ibn Abdallah, one of his most celebrated generals, with 25,000 Syrian troops in response. The Khazars retreated to the area of Derbent (whose Muslim garrison was still holding out) at the news of his approach. Learning that the local Lezgin chief was in contact with the Khazars, al-Jarrah set up camp on the river Rubas and announced the army would remain there for several days. Instead, he arrived at Derbent in a night march and entered it without resistance. From there, al-Jarrah launched raiding columns into Khazar territory ahead of the bulk of his army. His army met a Khazar army at the river al-Ran, one day's march north of Derbent, after joining the columns. According to the Derbent-nameh, al-Jarrah had 10,000 men (of whom 4,000 were vassal princes); al-Tabari cites the Arab strength as 25,000. The Khazars, commanded by Barjik (one of the Khazar khagan's sons), reportedly numbered 40,000. The Arabs were victorious, losing 4,000 soldiers to the Khazars' 7,000. Advancing north, the Arab army captured the settlements of Khamzin and Targhu and resettled their inhabitants elsewhere.

Finally, the Arab army reached Balanjar. The city had strong fortifications during the first Muslim attacks in the mid-seventh century, but apparently they were later neglected; the Khazars defended their capital by surrounding the citadel with a wagon fort of 300 wagons tied together with ropes, a common tactic among nomads. The Arabs broke through, storming the city on 21 August 722. Most of Balanjar's inhabitants were killed or enslaved, but a few (including its governor) fled north. The booty seized by the Arabs was so large that each of the 30,000 horsemen—clearly an exaggeration by later historians—in the Arab army reportedly received 300 gold dinars. Al-Jarrah is said to have ransomed the wife and children of Balanjar's governor, and the governor began informing him about Khazar movements. Muslim sources also say the governor accepted an offer to recover all his belongings (and Balanjar) if he submitted to Muslim rule, but this is probably false. At that time, so many Khazar prisoners were taken that al-Jarrah ordered some of them drowned in the Balanjar River.

Al-Jarrah's army also reduced the neighbouring fortresses and continued their march north. The strongly garrisoned fortress city of Wabandar, with 40,000 households reported by 13th-century historian Ibn al-Athir, capitulated in exchange for tribute. Al-Jarrah intended to advance to Samandar, the next major Khazar settlement, but cut his campaign short when he learned the Khazars were gathering large forces there. The Arabs had not yet defeated the main Khazar army, which (like all nomad forces) did not depend on cities for supplies. The presence of this force near Samandar and reports of rebellions among the mountain tribes in their rear forced the Arabs to retreat to Warthan, south of the Caucasus. On his return, al-Jarrah reported on his campaign to the caliph and requested additional troops to defeat the Khazars. This is an indication of the severity of the fighting and, according to Blankinship, that the campaign was not necessarily the resounding success portrayed in Muslim sources. As Noonan comments, "though the [caliph] sent his best wishes, no further forces were dispatched" to the Caucasus front.

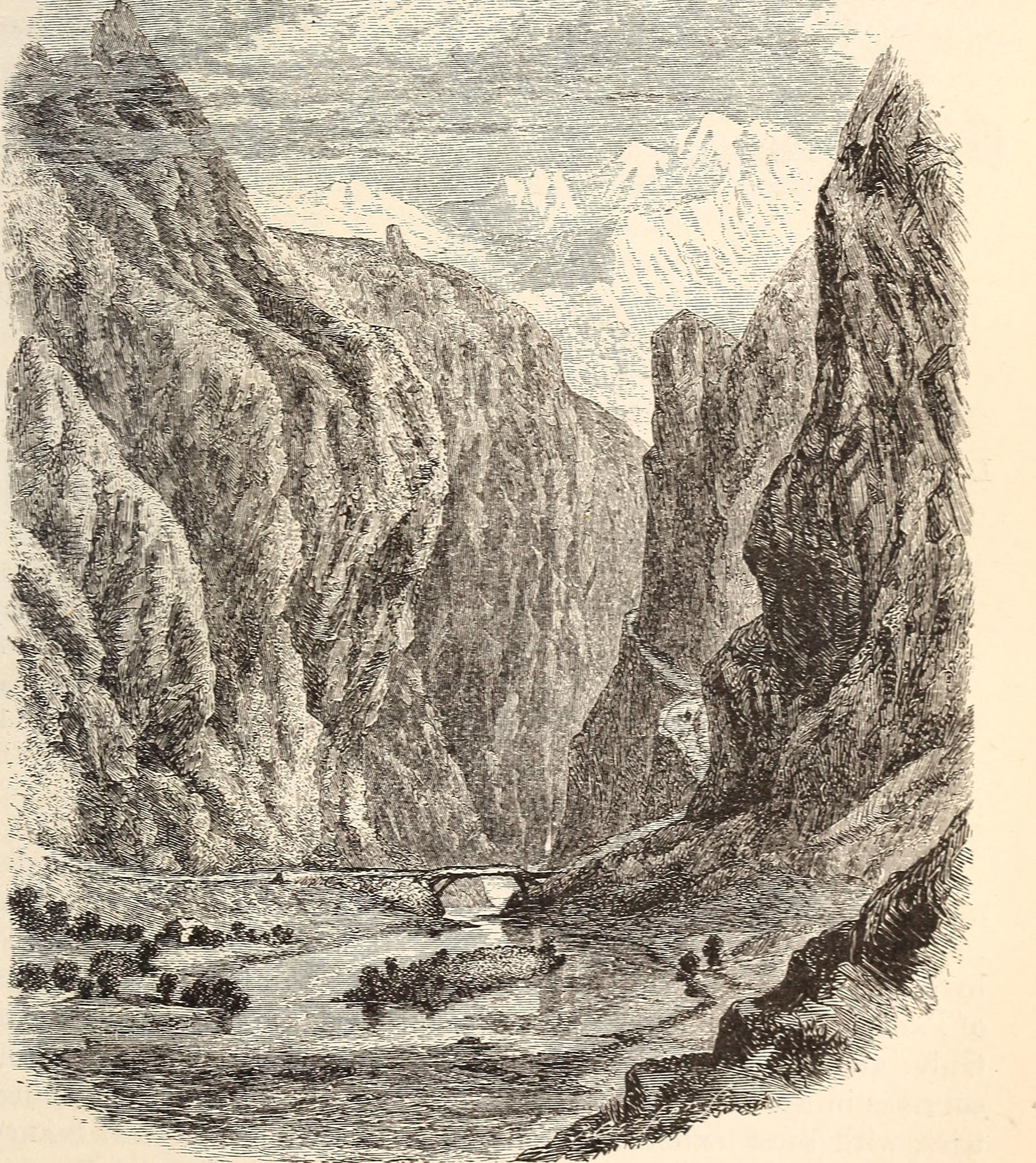
The Darial Pass c. 1861

In 723, al-Jarrah reportedly led another campaign into Alania via the Darial Pass. Sources say he marched "beyond Balanjar", conquering several fortresses and capturing much loot, but offer few details. However, modern scholars consider this to probably be an echo (or, possibly, the actual date) of the 722 Balanjar campaign. The Khazars raided south of the Caucasus in response, but in February 724, al-Jarrah decisively defeated them in a days-long battle between the rivers Cyrus and Araxes. The new caliph, Hisham ibn Abd al-Malik (r. 724–743), promised to send reinforcements but failed to do so. In 724, al-Jarrah captured Tiflis and brought Caucasian Iberia and the lands of the Alans under Muslim suzerainty. These campaigns made al-Jarrah the first Muslim commander to cross the Darial Pass, secures the Muslim flank against a possible Khazar attack through the pass, and gave the Arabs a second invasion route into Khazar territory. Al-Jarrah was also the first Arab commander to settle Khazar prisoners as colonists, around Qabala.

In 725, the caliph replaced al-Jarrah with his own half-brother Maslama, governor of the Jazira. Maslama's appointment is considered by modern historians to attest to the importance placed by the caliph on the Khazar front, since he was not only a member of the rulingy dynasty, but also one of the most distinguished generals of the Umayyad empire. Nevertheless, Maslama remained in the Jazira for the time being, more concerned with operations against the Byzantines. In his stead, he sent al-Harith ibn Amr al-Ta'i to the Caucasus front. Al-Harith spent his first year consolidating Muslim rule in Caucasian Albania: he campaigned along the Cyrus against the regions of al-Lakz and Khasmadan, and was probably also preoccupied with supervising that year's census. The following year, Barjik launched a major invasion of Albania and Adharbayjan. The Khazars laid siege to Warthan with mangonels. Al-Harith defeated them on the Araxes and drove them north of the river, but the Arab position was clearly precarious.

Maslama assumed personal command of the Khazar front in 727. The Arab commander was faced for the first time with the khagan himself, as both sides escalated the conflict. Maslama took the offensive, probably reinforced with Syrian and Jaziran troops. He recovered the Darial Pass (which was apparently lost after al-Jarrah's 724 expedition) and pushed into Khazar territory, campaigning there until the onset of winter forced him to return to Adharbayjan. His second invasion, the following year, was less successful; Blankinship calls it a "near disaster". Arab sources report the Umayyad troops fought for thirty or forty days in the mud, with continuous rain, before defeating the khagan on 17 September 728. The impact of their victory is questionable, however, as Maslama was ambushed by the Khazars upon his return, and the Arabs abandoned their baggage train and fled through the Darial Pass to safety. After this campaign, Maslama was replaced yet again by al-Jarrah. Despite his energy, Maslama's campaigns failed to produce the desired results; by 729, the Arabs had lost control of the northeastern parts of the South Caucasus and were again on the defensive, with al-Jarrah having to defend Adharbayjan against a Khazar invasion.

=== Battle of Ardabil and Arab reaction ===
In 729/30, al-Jarrah returned to the offensive through Tiflis and the Darial Pass. Ibn al-Athir reports he reached the Khazar capital, al-Bayda on the lower Volga, but no other source mentions this; modern historians generally consider this improbable, possibly resulting from confusion with other events. Al-Jarrah's attacks were followed by a massive Khazar invasion, (Note: Łewond reports the Khazar invasion was preceded by the death of the khagan, leaving his widow Parsbit as ruler over the Khazars. Consequently, Semyonov suggests al-Jarrah's raid against al-Bayda may indeed have reached al-Bayda, or at least succeeded in killing the khagan, and the subsequent invasion was launched as a campaign of vengeance.) with reportedly 300,000 soldiers, which forced the Arabs to again retreat south of the Caucasus and defend Albania.

It is unclear whether the Khazar invasion was through the Darial Pass, the Caspian Gates, or both. Different commanders are mentioned for the Khazar forces; Arab sources say the invasion was led by Barjik (the khagan's son), and Łewond identifies Tar'mach as the Khazar commander. Al-Jarrah apparently dispersed some of his forces, withdrawing his main army to Bardha'a and then to Ardabil. Ardabil was the capital of Adharbayjan, and most of the Muslim settlers and their families (about 30,000) lived within its walls. Informed of Arab movements by the prince of Iberia, the Khazars moved around al-Jarrah and attacked Warthan. Al-Jarrah rushed to assist the town; he is next recorded as being at Ardabil again, however, confronting the main Khazar army.

After a three-day battle from 7 to 9 December 730, al-Jarrah's 25,000-strong army was all but annihilated by the Khazars. Al-Jarrah was among the fallen; command passed to his brother al-Hajjaj, who could not prevent the sacking of Ardabil. The 10th-century historian Agapius of Hierapolis reports the Khazars took as many as 40,000 prisoners from the city, al-Jarrah's army, and the surrounding countryside. The Khazars raided the province at will, sacking Ganza and attacking other settlements. Some detachments reached Mosul in the northern Jazira, adjacent to the Umayyad heartlands in Syria.

The defeat at Ardabil—news of which spread even to Byzantium—was a shock to the Muslims, who faced an army penetrating deep into the Caliphate for the first time. Caliph Hisham again appointed Maslama to fight the Khazars as governor of Armenia and Adharbayjan. Until Maslama could assemble enough forces, veteran military leader Sa'id ibn Amr al-Harashi was sent to stem the Khazar invasion. With a lance reportedly used at the Battle of Badr as a standard for his army and with 100,000 dirhams to recruit soldieds, Sa'id went to Raqqa. The forces he could muster immediately were apparently small, but he set out to meet the Khazars, possibly disobeying orders to maintain a defensive stance. Sa'id encountered refugees from Ardabil on the way and enlisted them into his army, paying each recruit ten gold dinars as inducement.

Sa'id was fortunate. The Khazars had dispersed in small detachments after their victory at Ardabil, plundering the countryside, and the Arabs defeated them one by one. Sa'id recovered Akhlat on Lake Van, then moved northeast to Bardha'a and south to relieve the siege of Warthan. He encountered a 10,000-strong Khazar army near Bajarwan and defeated it in a surprise night attack, killing most of the Khazars and rescuing their 5,000 Muslim prisoners, including al-Jarrah's daughter. The surviving Khazars fled north, with Sa'id in pursuit. Muslim sources record a number of other, heavily embellished attacks by Sa'id on improbably large Khazar armies; in one, Barjik was reportedly killed in single combat with the Umayyad general. Generally considered "romance rather than history", according to British orientalist Douglas M. Dunlop, they may be contemporary but imaginative retellings of Sa'id's campaign. According to Blankinship, "The various battles fought and rescues of Muslim prisoners achieved by Sa'id in these sources seem to all go back to a single battle near Bajarwan".

Sa'id's unexpected success angered Maslama; Łewond says Sa'id had won the war and received what glory (and booty) there was to be had. Sa'id was relieved of his command in early 731 by Maslama and imprisoned at Qabala and Bardha'a, charged with endangering the army by disobeying orders, and was released (and rewarded) only after the caliph intervened on his behalf. Noonan points out the jealousies between the Arab commanders and their rapid turnover adversely impacted their war effort, as it "inhibited the development and execution of a long-term strategy for dealing with the Khazar problem".

=== Garrisoning of Derbent ===
Maslama took command of a large army and immediately took the offensive. He restored the provinces of Albania to Muslim allegiance (after punishing the inhabitants of Khaydhan who resisted him) and reached Derbent, where he found a Khazar garrison of 1,000 and their families. Leaving al-Harith ibn Amr al-Ta'i at Derbent, Maslama advanced north. Although details of this campaign may be conflated in the sources with the 728 campaign, he apparently took Khamzin, Balanjar, and Samandar before being forced to retreat after a confrontation with the main Khazar army under the khagan. Leaving their campfires burning, the Arabs withdrew in the middle of the night and quickly reached Derbent in a series of forced marches. The Khazars shadowed Maslama's march south and attacked him near Derbent, but the Arab army (augmented by local levies) resisted until a small, elite force attacked the khagan's tent and wounded him. The Muslims, encouraged, then defeated the Khazars. The Khazar commander Barjik may have been killed in this battle or campaign.

Taking advantage of his victory, Maslama poisoned the water supply of Derbent to drive the Khazar garrison out. He re-established the city as an Arab military colony, restored its fortifications, (Note: Later Arabic accounts of Maslama's fortification activity have deliberate echoes of the similar endeavours under Khosrow I, as well as the legendary Wall of Alexander against the Gog and Magog.) and garrisoned it with 24,000 troops, mostly from Syria, divided into quarters by their district (jund) of origin. Leaving his relative Marwan ibn Muhammad (later the last Umayyad caliph from 744 to 750) in command at Derbent, Maslama returned with the rest of his army (primarily the favoured Jaziran and Qinnasrini contingents) south of the Caucasus for the winter; the Khazars returned to their abandoned towns. Maslama's record (despite the capture of Derbent) was apparently unsatisfactory for Hisham, who replaced his brother in March 732 with Marwan ibn Muhammad.

That summer, Marwan led 40,000 soldiers north into Khazar lands. Accounts of this campaign are confused. Ibn A'tham records he reached Balanjar and returned to Derbent with much captured livestock, but the campaign also experienced heavy rain and mud. Highly reminiscent of descriptions of Maslama's 728 and 731 expeditions, the veracity of Ibn A'tham's account is doubtful. Ibn Khayyat reports Marwan led a far more limited campaign on the region just north of Derbent, retiring there for the winter. Marwan was more active in the south, appointing Ashot III Bagratuni as the presiding prince of Armenia; this effectively gave the country broad autonomy in exchange for the service of its soldiers in the Caliphate's armies. According to Blankinship, this unique concession indicates the Caliphate's worsening manpower crisis. Around this time, the Khazars and Byzantines strengthened their ties and formalized their alliance against the Arabs with the marriage of Constantine V to the Khazar princess Tzitzak.

=== Marwan's invasion of Khazaria and end of the war ===
After Marwan's 732 expedition, a period of quiet began. Sa'id al-Harashi replaced Marwan as governor of Armenia and Adharbayjan in spring 733, but undertook no campaigns during the two years of his governorship. Blankinship attributes this inactivity to the exhaustion of the Arab armies and draws a parallel with the 732–734 quiet phase in Transoxiana, where the Arabs had also experienced a series of costly defeats at the hands of the Türgesh (another Turkic steppe power). Marwan reportedly criticised the policy followed in the Caucasus to Caliph Hisham, recommending that he be sent to deal with the Khazars with an army of 120,000 men. When Sa'id asked to be relieved due to failing eyesight, Hisham appointed Marwan to replace him.

Marwan returned to the Caucasus c. 735, determined to launch a decisive blow against the Khazars, but was apparently unable to launch anything but local expeditions for some time. He established a new base of operations at Kasak, about twenty parsangs (roughly 120 km or 75 mi) from Tiflis and forty from Bardha'a, and his initial expeditions were against minor local potentates. Agapius of Hierapolis and the 12th-century historian Michael the Syrian record the Arabs and Khazars concluded a peace during this period, which Muslim sources ignore or explain as a short-lived ruse by Marwan to buy time for preparations and mislead the Khazars about his intentions.

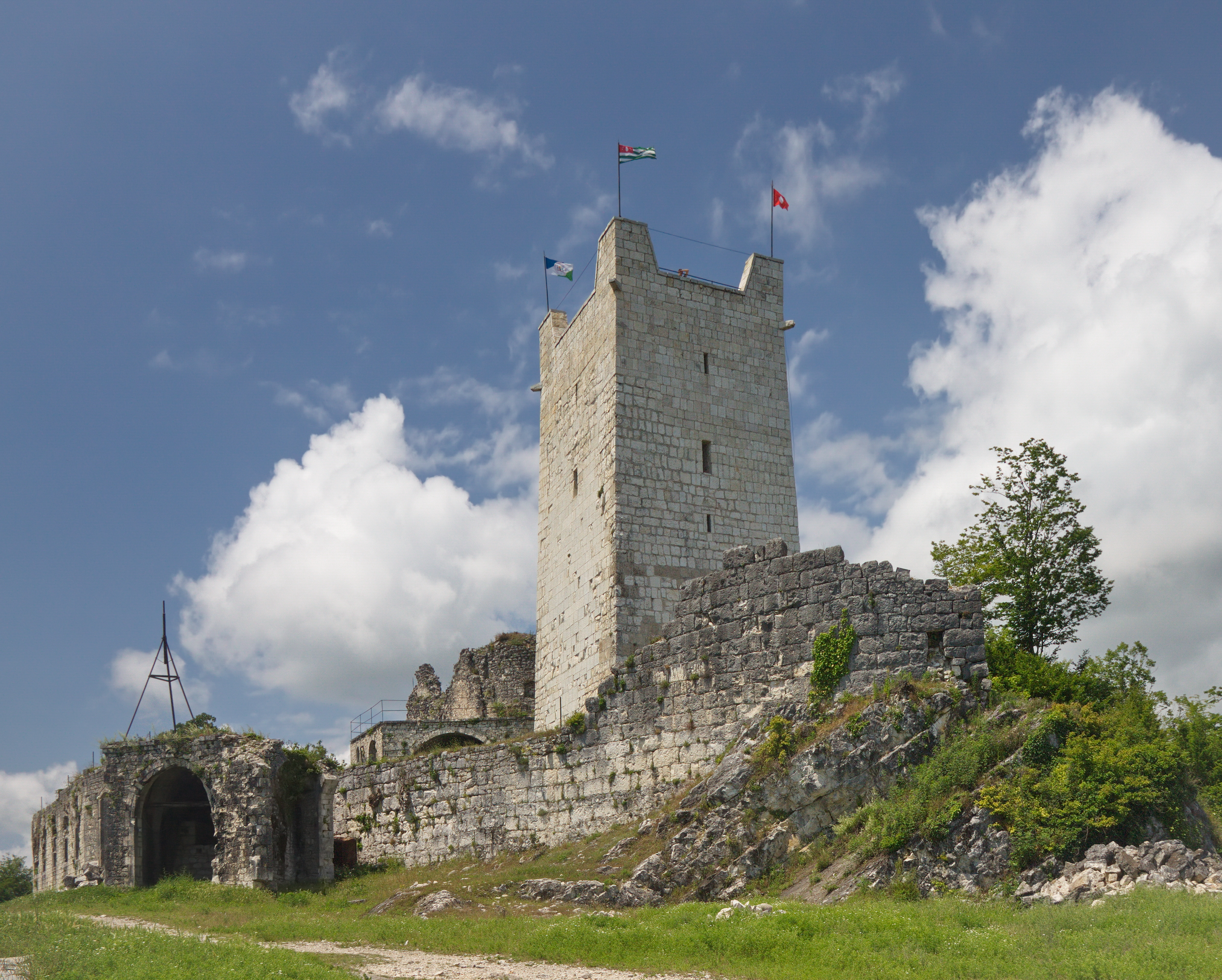
The medieval citadel of Anakopia in 2014

In the meantime, Marwan consolidated his rear. In 735, the Umayyad general captured three fortresses in Alania (near the Darial Pass). The Arabs also seized Tuman Shah, the ruler of a North Caucasian principality who was restored to his lands by the caliph as a client. Marwan campaigned the following year against Wartanis, another local prince, whose castle was sacked, and its defenders killed despite their surrender; Wartanis tried to flee but was captured and executed by the inhabitants of Khamzin. Marwan also subdued the Armenian factions who were hostile to the Arabs and Ashot III, their client. He then pushed into Iberia, driving its ruler to seek refuge in the fortress of Anakopia on the Black Sea coast in the Byzantine protectorate of Abkhazia. Marwan besieged Anakopia, but was forced to retire due to an outbreak of dysentery in his army. His cruelty during the invasion of Iberia earned him the epithet "the Deaf" from the Iberians.

Marwan prepared a massive campaign for 737, aiming to end the war. He apparently went to Damascus to ask Hisham for support; the 10th-century historian Bal'ami says his army numbered 150,000, including regular forces from Syria and the Jazira, jihad volunteers, Armenian troops under Ashot III, and armed camp followers and servants. Whatever the size of Marwan's army, it was the largest ever sent against the Khazars. He attacked simultaneously from two directions. 30,000 soldiers (including most of the levies from the Caucasian principalities) under Derbent governor Asid ibn Zafir al-Sulami advanced north along the Caspian coast, and Marwan crossed the Darial Pass with the bulk of his forces. The invasion met little resistance; Arab sources report Marwan detained the Khazar envoy and only released him (with a declaration of war) when he was deep in Khazar territory. The two Arab armies converged on Samandar, where a review was held; according to Ibn A'tham, the troops were issued new white clothing—the Umayyad dynastic colour—and new spears. Marwan then advanced, according to some Arab sources, to the Khazar capital of al-Bayda on the Volga. The khagan withdrew towards the Ural Mountains, but left a considerable force to protect the capital. This was a "spectacularly deep penetration", according to Blankinship, but of little strategic value; the 10th-century travellers Ibn Fadlan and Istakhri describe the Khazar capital as little more than a large encampment, and there is no evidence it was larger or more urbanized in the past.

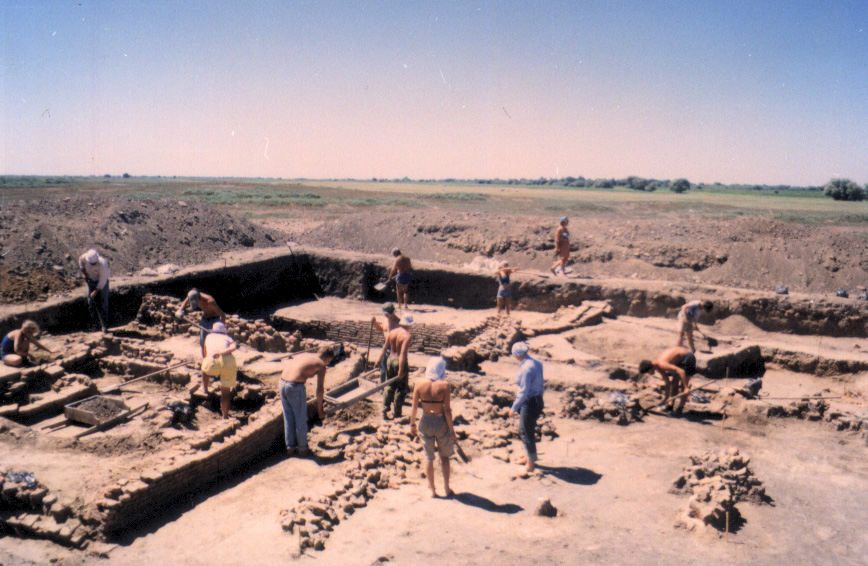
Excavations at Samosdelka in 2002, a site identified by some archaeologists as the Khazar capital al-Bayda (Atil)

The subsequent course of the campaign is only chronicled by Ibn A'tham and other sources drawing from his work. (Note: Artamonov notes that most Arabic sources about the campaign are vague, with little detail, and that Armenian historians only mention Arab attacks on the lands of the North Caucasus Huns and the capture of Barachan (Balanjar).) According to this account, Marwan ignored al-Bayda and pursued the khagan north along the west bank of the Volga; the Khazar army, under the tarkhan (a high-ranking dignitary in Turkic states), shadowed the Arab advance from the east bank. The Arabs attacked the Burtas, whose territory extended to that of the Volga Bulgars and who were Khazar subjects, (Note: According to medieval Arab geographers, the land of the Burtas was 15–20 days' journey north of al-Bayda, putting it in present-day Mordovia.) taking 20,000 families (40,000 people in other accounts) captive. The Khazars avoided battle, and Marwan sent a detachment of 40,000 troops across the Volga under al-Kawthar ibn al-Aswad al-Anbari. The Khazars were surprised in a swamp; 10,000 Khazars were killed in the ensuing battle (including the tarkhan), and 7,000 were captured.

This appears to be the only fighting of the campaign between the Arabs and Khazars, and the Khazar khagan soon requested peace. Marwan reportedly offered "Islam or the sword", and the khagan agreed to convert to Islam. Two faqihs (experts in Islamic law) were sent to instruct him on the details of religious observance; the prohibition of wine, pork, and unclean meat is especially noted. Marwan also brought a large number of Slav and Khazar captives south, whom he resettled in the eastern Caucasus; al-Baladhuri says about 20,000 Slavs were settled at Kakheti, and the Khazars were resettled at al-Lakz, where they embraced Islam. The Slavs soon killed their appointed governor and fled north, and Marwan pursued and killed them.

Marwan's 737 expedition was the climax of the Arab–Khazar wars, but its results were meagre. Although the Arab campaigns after Ardabil may have discouraged the Khazars from further warfare, recognition of Islam or Arab supremacy by the khagan was evidently based on the presence of Arab troops deep in Khazar territory, which was unsustainable. The withdrawal of the Arab armies, followed by the Muslim civil wars of the 740s and the subsequent collapse of the Umayyad regime in the Abbasid Revolution certainly "left little political pressure to remain Muslim", according to Golden. Even the credibility of the khagan's conversion to Islam is disputed by modern scholars; al-Baladhuri's account, which is probably closest to the original sources, suggests it was not the khagan but a minor lord who converted to Islam and was placed in charge of the Khazars at al-Lakz. Blankinship cites this as indicating the implausibility of the khagan's conversion, since those Khazars who actually converted to Islam had to be moved to safety in Umayyad territory.

The khagan's conversion is also contradicted by the fact that the Khazar court is known to have embraced Judaism as its faith. Dunlop placed this as early as c. 740, but the process is not well documented and was apparently gradual; it was certainly underway in the last decades of the eighth century, according to historical sources, and numismatic evidence indicates it was probably complete by the 830s. The conversion was primarily confined to the Khazar elites, and Christianity, Islam, and Tengrism and local pagan beliefs remained widespread among the Khazar subjects, and even members of the royal house are known to have professed Islam—and thus been barred from ascending the throne. Many modern scholars believe the Khazar elites' conversion to Judaism was a means of stressing their own identity as separate from (and avoiding assimilation by) the Christian Byzantine and Muslim Arab empires they were in contact with, and was a direct result of the 737 events.

=== Aftermath and impact ===
Whatever the real events of Marwan's campaigns, warfare between the Khazars and Arabs ceased for more than two decades after 737. Arab military activity in the Caucasus continued until 741, with Marwan launching repeated expeditions against minor principalities in present-day Dagestan. (Note: The Arabic sources list expeditions to extract tribute (a levy of slaves and annual grain supplies for Derbent) and impose obligations of military assistance against the principalities of Sarir, Ghumik, Khiraj (or Khizaj), Tuman, Sirikaran, Khamzin, Sindan (also known as Sughdan or Masdar), Layzan (or al-Lakz), Tabasaran, Sharwan, and Filan.) Blankinship says these campaigns more closely resembled raids, designed to seize plunder and extract tribute to ensure the upkeep of the Arab army, than attempts at permanent conquest. On the other hand, Dunlop argues Marwan came "within an ace of succeeding" in his conquest of Khazaria, and suggests the Arab commander "apparently intended to resume operations against the khagan at a later date" which never materialized.

Despite the Umayyad establishment of a more-or-less stable frontier anchored at Derbent, they could not advance any further (despite repeated efforts) in the face of Khazar resistance. Dunlop drew parallels between the Umayyad–Khazar confrontation in the Caucasus and that between the Umayyads and the Franks at roughly the same time across the Pyrenees, which ended with the Battle of Tours; according to Dunlop, like the Franks in the west, the Khazars played a crucial role in stemming the tide of early Muslim conquest. This view was also shared by Soviet historian and Khazar expert Mikhail Artamonov, as well as by Golden, and C. E. Bosworth. According to Golden, during the long conflict the Arabs were "able to maintain their hold over much of Transcaucasia"; despite occasional Khazar raids, this "had never really been seriously threatened". In their failure to push the border north of Derbent, however, the Arabs were clearly "reaching the outer limits of their imperial drive".

Arab control in most of the territories under their nominal rule remained thin on the ground, being exercised mostly through local princes who had submitted to Muslim rule. This submission was often only nominal, unless it could be enforced by Arab governors by force. Likewise, Islamization proceeded slowly and was likely superficial at first. For a period of some four centuries, while their power lasted, the Khazars remained an obstacle to the further northward expansion of Islam. Blankinship considers the Caliphate's limited gains in the second war disproportionate to the resources expended; effective Arab control was limited to the lowlands and coast, and the land was too poor to replenish the Umayyad treasury. In addition, the large garrison at Derbent further depleted the already-overstretched Syro-Jaziran army, the main pillar of the Umayyad regime, whose dispersion across the Caliphate's far-flung fronts was eventually the major factor in the fall of the Umayyad dynasty during the civil wars of the 740s and the subsequent Abbasid Revolution.

Balanjar was no longer mentioned after the Arab–Khazar wars, but a people known as "Baranjar" was later recorded as living in Volga Bulgaria—probably descendants of the original tribe which gave the town its name and resettled there as a result of the wars. Soviet and Russian archaeologists and historians such as Murad Magomedov and Svetlana Pletnyova consider the eighth-century emergence of the Saltovo-Mayaki culture in the steppe region between the Don and Dnieper Rivers as resulting from the Arab–Khazar conflict, since Alans from the North Caucasus were resettled there by the Khazars.

== Later conflicts ==
Political map of Europe and the Mediterranean in the early ninth century

The Khazars resumed their raids on Muslim territory after the Abbasid succession in 750, reaching deep into the South Caucasus. Although the Khazars had re-consolidated control of Dagestan almost to the gates of Derbent by the ninth century, they never seriously attempted to challenge Muslim control of the southern Caucasus. At the same time, the new Abbasid dynasty's hold on its empire was too tenuous for a resumption of the ambitious Umayyad offensives. In Noonan's judgment, "[T]he Khazar-Arab Wars ended in a stalemate", followed by a gradual rapprochement that encouraged the growth of trade between the two empires: large, stashed quantities of Arab coins in Eastern Europe suggest the second half of the 8th century marks the start of the trade routes linking the Baltic and Eastern Europe with the Caucasus and the Middle East.

The first conflict between the Khazars and Abbasids resulted from a diplomatic manoeuvre by Caliph al-Mansur (r. 754–775). Attempting to strengthen the Caliphate's ties with the Khazars, he ordered the governor of Armenia, Yazid al-Sulami, to marry a daughter of the khagan Baghatur c. 760. The marriage took place, but she and her child died in childbirth two years later. The khagan, suspecting the Muslims of poisoning his daughter, raided south of the Caucasus from 762 to 764. Led by the Khwarezmian tarkhan Ras, the Khazars devastated Albania, Armenia and Iberia, and captured Tiflis. Yazid evaded capture, but the Khazars returned north with thousands of captives and much booty. When the deposed Iberian ruler Nerse tried to induce the Khazars to campaign against the Abbasids and restore him to his throne in 780, the khagan refused. This was probably the result of brief anti-Byzantine Khazar foreign policy resulting from disputes in the Crimea; at this time, the Khazars helped Leon II of Abkhazia throw off Byzantine rule.

Peace reigned in the Caucasus between the Arabs and Khazars until 799, when the last major Khazar attack into the South Caucasus occurred. Chroniclers again attribute the attack to a failed marriage alliance. Georgian sources say the khagan wanted to marry Shushan, the beautiful daughter of Prince Archil of Kakheti (r. 736–786) and sent his general Bulchan to invade Iberia and capture her. Most of central K'art'li was occupied, and Prince Juansher (r. 786–807) was taken captive for several years. Shushan committed suicide rather than be captured, and the furious khagan had Bulchan executed. (Note: According to Semyonov, these events are mis-dated and should be attributed to the 730 Khazar invasion; Semyonov also suggests Juansher's seven-year captivity coincides with the end of the second war.) Arab chroniclers attribute the conflict to plans by the Abbasid governor, the Barmakid al-Fadl ibn Yahya, to marry one of the khagan's daughters, who died on the journey south. A completely different story is reported by al-Tabari; the Khazars were invited to attack by a local Arab magnate in retaliation for the execution of his father, the governor of Derbent, by the general Sa'id ibn Salm. According to Arab sources, the Khazars raided as far as the Araxes against troops led by Yazid ibn Mazyad (the new governor of the South Caucasus) and reserve forces led by Khuzayma ibn Khazim.

The Arabs and Khazars continued to clash sporadically in the North Caucasus during the ninth and tenth centuries, but the warfare was localized and far less intense than the eighth-century wars. The Ottoman historian Münejjim Bashi records a period of warfare from c. 901 to 912, perhaps linked to the Caspian raids of the Rus' (whom the Khazars permitted to cross their lands unhindered) at about the same time. For the Khazars, peace on the southern border became more important as new threats to their hegemony emerged in the steppes. Caliphal authority also receded over the 9th and 10th centuries, allowing the re-emergence of native Christian states, initially as caliphal vassals, but de facto independent: Alania, Bagratuni Armenia, and Iberia. The final disintegration of the Abbasid empire during the early 10th century also led to the establishment of large Muslim principalities in the region, often ruled by non-native (Daylamite or Kurdish) dynasties, such as the Shirvanshahs, the Sallarids, and the Shaddadids, to name the most prominent.

The Khazar presence also diminished with the progressive collapse of their authority in the 10th century and defeats by the Rus' and other Turkic nomads such as the Oghuz Turks. The Khazar realm contracted to its core around the lower Volga, removed from the reach of the Muslim principalities of the Caucasus; Ibn al-Athir's reports of a war between the Shaddadids with the "Khazars" in 1030 probably refers, instead, to the Georgians. The last Khazars found refuge among their former enemies; Münejjim Bashi records that in 1064, "the remnants of the Khazars, consisting of three thousand households, arrived in Qahtan [somewhere in Dagestan] from the Khazar territory. They rebuilt it and settled in it".

== Sources ==
- Albrecht, Sarah (2016). "Dār al-Islām and dār al-ḥarb". In Fleet, Kate; Krämer, Gudrun; Matringe, Denis; Nawas, John; Rowson, Everett (eds.). Encyclopaedia of Islam (3rd ed.). Brill Online. ISSN 1873-9830.
- Artamonov, M. I. (1962). История хазар [History of the Khazars] (in Russian). Leningrad: Издательство Государственного Эрмитажа. OCLC 490020276.
- Barthold, W. & Golden, P. (1978). "K̲h̲azar". In van Donzel, E.; Lewis, B.; Pellat, Ch. & Bosworth, C. E. (eds.). The Encyclopaedia of Islam, Second Edition. Volume IV: Iran–Kha. Leiden: E. J. Brill. pp. 1172–1181. doi:10.1163/1573-3912_islam_SIM_4267. ISBN 978-90-04-05745-6. OCLC 758278456.
- Blankinship, Khalid Yahya (1994). The End of the Jihâd State: The Reign of Hishām ibn ʻAbd al-Malik and the Collapse of the Umayyads. Albany, New York: State University of New York Press. ISBN 978-0-7914-1827-7.
- Bosworth, C. E. & MacKenzie, D. N. (1978). "al-Ḳabḳ". In van Donzel, E.; Lewis, B.; Pellat, Ch. & Bosworth, C. E. (eds.). The Encyclopaedia of Islam, Second Edition. Volume IV: Iran–Kha. Leiden: E. J. Brill. pp. 341–351. doi:10.1163/1573-3912_islam_COM_0405. ISBN 978-90-04-05745-6. OCLC 758278456.
- Bosworth, C. E., ed. (1989). The History of al-Ṭabarī, Volume XXX: The ʿAbbāsid Caliphate in Equilibrium: The Caliphates of Mūsā al-Hādī and Hārūn al-Rashīd, A.D. 785–809/A.H. 169–192. SUNY Series in Near Eastern Studies. Albany, New York: State University of New York Press. ISBN 978-0-88706-564-4.
- Brook, Kevin Alan (2006). The Jews of Khazaria, Second Edition. Plymouth: Rowman & Littlefield. ISBN 978-0-7425-4982-1.
- Canard, M. (1960). "Armīniya. 2. — Armenia under Arab domination". In Gibb, H. A. R.; Kramers, J. H.; Lévi-Provençal, E.; Schacht, J.; Lewis, B. & Pellat, Ch. (eds.). The Encyclopaedia of Islam, Second Edition. Volume I: A–B. Leiden: E. J. Brill. pp. 635–638. doi:10.1163/1573-3912_islam_COM_0064. OCLC 495469456.
- Cobb, Paul M. (2010). "The Empire in Syria, 705–763". In Robinson, Chase F. (ed.). The New Cambridge History of Islam, Volume 1: The Formation of the Islamic World, Sixth to Eleventh Centuries. Cambridge: Cambridge University Press. pp. 226–268. ISBN 978-0-521-83823-8.
- Dunlop, Douglas M. (1954). The History of the Jewish Khazars. Princeton, New Jersey: Princeton University Press. OCLC 459245222.
- Frye, R. N. (1960). "Arrān". In Gibb, H. A. R.; Kramers, J. H.; Lévi-Provençal, E.; Schacht, J.; Lewis, B. & Pellat, Ch. (eds.). The Encyclopaedia of Islam, Second Edition. Volume I: A–B. Leiden: E. J. Brill. pp. 660–661. doi:10.1163/1573-3912_islam_SIM_0736. OCLC 495469456.
- Gocheleishvili, Iago (2014). "Caucasus, pre-900/1500". In Fleet, Kate; Krämer, Gudrun; Matringe, Denis; Nawas, John; Rowson, Everett (eds.). Encyclopaedia of Islam (3rd ed.). Brill Online. ISSN 1873-9830.
- Golden, Peter B. (1980). Khazar Studies: An Historico-Philological Inquiry into the Origins of the Khazars, Volume 1. Budapest: Akadémiai Kiadó. ISBN 963-05-1549-0.
- Golden, Peter B. (1992). An Introduction to the History of the Turkic Peoples: Ethnogenesis and State-Formation in Medieval and Early Modern Eurasia and the Middle East. Wiesbaden: Otto Harrassowitz. ISBN 978-3-44703274-2.
- Golden, Peter B.; Ben-Shammai, Haggai; Róna-Tas, András, eds. (2007). The World of the Khazars: New Perspectives. Selected Papers from the Jerusalem 1999 International Khazar Colloquium hosted by the Ben Zvi Institute. Leiden and Boston: Brill. ISBN 978-90-04-16042-2.
  - Golden, Peter B. (2007a). "Khazar Studies: Achievements and Perspectives". In Golden, Ben-Shammai & Róna-Tas (2007), pp. 7–58.
  - Golden, Peter B. (2007b). "The Conversion of the Khazars to Judaism". In Golden, Ben-Shammai & Róna-Tas (2007), pp. 123–162.
  - Noonan, Thomas S. "The Economy of the Khazar Khaganate". In Golden, Ben-Shammai & Róna-Tas (2007), pp. 207–244.
  - Wasserstein, David J. "The Khazars and the World of Islam". In Golden, Ben-Shammai & Róna-Tas (2007), pp. 373–386.
  - Zuckerman, Constantin. "The Khazars and Byzantium — The First Encounter". In Golden, Ben-Shammai & Róna-Tas (2007), pp. 399–432.
- Kemper, Michael (2013). "Daghestan". In Fleet, Kate; Krämer, Gudrun; Matringe, Denis; Nawas, John; Rowson, Everett (eds.). Encyclopaedia of Islam (3rd ed.). Brill Online. ISSN 1873-9830.
- Kennedy, Hugh (2001). The Armies of the Caliphs: Military and Society in the Early Islamic State. London and New York: Routledge. ISBN 0-415-25093-5.
- Lilie, Ralph-Johannes (1976). Die byzantinische Reaktion auf die Ausbreitung der Araber. Studien zur Strukturwandlung des byzantinischen Staates im 7. und 8. Jhd [The Byzantine Response to the Expansion of the Arabs. Studies on the structural change of the Byzantine state in the 7th and 8th centuries] (in German). Munich: Institut für Byzantinistik und Neugriechische Philologie der Universität München. OCLC 568754312.
- Mako, Gerald (2010). "The Possible Reasons for the Arab–Khazar Wars". Archivum Eurasiae Medii Aevi. 17: 45–57. ISSN 0724-8822 – via Academia.edu.
- Minorsky, V. (1960). "Ad̲h̲arbayd̲jān". In Gibb, H. A. R.; Kramers, J. H.; Lévi-Provençal, E.; Schacht, J.; Lewis, B. & Pellat, Ch. (eds.). The Encyclopaedia of Islam, Second Edition. Volume I: A–B. Leiden: E. J. Brill. pp. 188–191. doi:10.1163/1573-3912_islam_COM_0016. OCLC 495469456.
- Noonan, Thomas S. (1984). "Why Dirhams First Reached Russia: The Role of Arab-Khazar Relations in the Development of the Earliest Islamic Trade with Eastern Europe". Archivum Eurasiae Medii Aevi. 4: 151–282. ISSN 0724-8822.
- Noonan, Thomas S. (1992). "Byzantium and the Khazars: a special relationship?". In Shepard, Jonathan; Franklin, Simon (eds.). Byzantine Diplomacy: Papers from the Twenty-Fourth Spring Symposium of Byzantine Studies, Cambridge, March 1990. Aldershot, England: Variorium. pp. 109–132. ISBN 978-0860783381.
- Semyonov, Igor G. (2008). "Эпизоды биографии хазарского принца Барсбека" [Biographical Episodes of the Khazar Prince Barsbek] (PDF). Proceedings of the Fifteenth Annual International Conference on Jewish Studies, Part 2 (in Russian). Moscow. pp. 282–297. ISBN 978-5-8125-1212-5.
- Semyonov, Igor G. (2010). "Военная тактика хазарской армии в период войны против Арабского халифата в 706—737 годы" [Military Tactics of the Khazar Army in the Period of the War Against the Arab Caliphate in 706–737] (PDF). Proceedings of the Seventeenth Annual International Conference on Jewish Studies, Vol. II (in Russian). Moscow. pp. 7–15. ISBN 978-5-9860-4253-4.
- Smith, G. Rex, ed. (1994). The History of al-Ṭabarī, Volume XIV: The Conquest of Iran, A.D. 641–643/A.H. 21–23. SUNY Series in Near Eastern Studies. Albany, New York: State University of New York Press. ISBN 978-0-7914-1293-0.
- Vacca, Alison (2017). Non-Muslim Provinces under Early Islam: Islamic Rule and Iranian Legitimacy in Armenia and Caucasian Albania. New York: Cambridge University Press. ISBN 978-1-107-18851-8.
- Zhivkov, Boris (2015). Khazaria in the Ninth and Tenth Centuries. Translated by Daria Manova. Leiden: Brill. ISBN 978-90-04-29307-6.
