= List of Khazar cities =

This list includes the names of Khazar cities known from written sources. Of these, only Sarkel and, possibly, the city at the mouth of the Volga (known by various names) were founded by the Khazars; the rest arose in the preceding epoch.

Each toponym is provided with an explanation including an indication of its linguistic affiliation, suggested etymology, time of mention, and a list of the main synchronous sources where it appears. The name is given in the most common English variant. The same city (or part of it) could be called differently at different times and in different languages. The correlation of names and their attribution to archaeological sites are subjects of discussion.

Lists of Khazar cities are already contained in the Arab-Persian geographical literature contemporary to the Khazars. The oldest is found in Ibn Khordadbeh (mid-9th century). The longest list, numbering 11 names, is found in the anonymous work Hudud al-'Alam. Far from all names are amenable to decipherment.

In the course of modern archaeological research, numerous proto-urban centers have been discovered on the territory of Khazaria. However, among the cities of written sources, only Sarkel (Left-bank Tsimlyansk settlement) and Samkerts (Taman settlement) have a generally accepted localization.

Name	Language	Etymology	Time of existence	Sources
Al-Bayda	Arabic	"white fortress"	8th century	Al-Kufi, Ibn Khordadbeh, Ibn al-Faqih
Atil	Turkic	"River", after the name of the river Itil (Volga)	10th century	Arab geographers of the classical school: Al-Istakhri, Ibn Hawqal, al-Muqaddasi; Ibn Fadlan, al-Masudi, Letter of Joseph (without name), List of bishoprics of the Metropolitanate of Doros
Balanjar	Persian	"long ravine"	6th — 9th centuries	al-Tabari, al-Baladhuri, Ibn Khordadbeh, Ibn al-Faqih, al-Masudi
Khamlij	Turkic	"Khan's city"	9th century	Ibn Khordadbeh, Ibn Rusta
Khazaran	Persian	"city of Khazars"	10th century	Arab geographers of the classical school, Schechter Letter
Samkerts (Byz. Tamatarha, Old Rus. Tmutarakan)	Turkic	? (Tamatarha — "city of the tarkhan Taman")	9th — 10th centuries	Ibn al-Faqih, Letter of Joseph, Schechter Letter
Sarkel (Old Rus. Belaya Vezha)	Turkic	"white house"	834/837 — 965	Constantine Porphyrogenitus, Letter of Joseph, Primary Chronicle, "Journey of Pimen to Tsargrad"
Saryshin	Turkic	"white... (island, city?)"	9th century	Ibn Rusta
Semender	Persian	"white city" or "extreme door"	6th — 10th centuries	al-Baladhuri, Al-Kufi, Ibn Khordadbeh, Al-Istakhri, Ibn Hawqal, al-Masudi, Letter of Joseph
Varachan	Armenian	?	7th century	Movses Kaghankatvatsi, Armenian Geography
