= Battle of Derbent (722) =

- Part of the Arab–Khazar wars
Date	722
Location	Derbent
Result	Umayyad victory

Belligerents
Khazar Khaganate	Umayyad Caliphate

Commanders and leaders
Barjik	Al-Jarrah ibn Abdallah

Strength
40,000 men	25,000 men

Casualties and losses
7,000 killed	4,000 killed

The Battle of Derbent was a military engagement between the Umayyads and the Khazar Khaganate near the city of Derbent, Russia. The Umayyads won a resounding victory against the Khazars and repelled their invasion.

In the year 722, the Khazars, a nomadic Turkic people, invaded Armenia with a force of 30,000 men. They scored a victory over the small Umayyad forces in a place called Marj al-Hijarah. The defeated Umayyad force retreated back to Syria while their camp fell to the invaders. The Umayyad Caliph, Yazid II, was distressed when he heard the news of the defeat. He quickly appointed the general Al-Jarrah ibn Abdallah as governor of Armenia, with orders to attack the enemy in their own lands. Al-Jarrah quickly marched on to Derbent, where the garrison was holding out against the Khazars. When they saw the approach of the Arabs, they retreated.

Al-Jarrah set up a camp nearby and ordered the local chiefs to join them with their levies. He also dispatched raiding parties into the enemy territories and returned with loot and captives. The next day, the Khazar Khagan, Barjik, arrived with a force of 40,000 men to repel the Umayyads. The Umayyads had a force of 25,000 men. Al-Jarrah began exhorting his men to fight, promising those who win gain booty. The following battle was fierce and bloody, in which the Umayyads routed the Khazars, massacring them in great numbers and gaining a large amount of loot. Casualties have been heavy on both sides. The Khazars lost 7,000, while the Umayyads lost 4,000.

After victory, the Umayyads continued their advance. They subdued Khamzin and Targhu and resettled their inhabitants elsewhere. Al-Jarrah then marched to Balanjar which he captured.

== Sources ==
- Dunlop, D. M (1954), The history of the Jewish Khazars.
- Artamonov, M. I. (1962). История хазар [History of the Khazars].
- Khalid Yahya Blankinship (1994), The End of the Jihâd State, The Reign of Hishām Ibn ʻAbd Al-Malik and the Collapse of the Umayyads.
