= Battle of Balanjar (722) =

723 battle during Khazar-Arab wars

- Part of the Arab–Khazar wars
Date	21 August 722
Location	Balanjar
Result	Umayyad victory

Belligerents
Khazar Khaganate	Umayyad Caliphate

Commanders and leaders
Balanjar governor	Al-Jarrah ibn Abdallah

Strength
Unknown	25,000-30,000 men

Casualties and losses
Heavy	Unknown

The Battle of Balanjar took place during the Khazar–Arab Wars. The Umayyads crushed the Khazar army and captured Balanjar after a heavy battle.

== Battle ==
After the victory at Derbent in 722, the Umayyads, under the general Al-Jarrah ibn Abdallah, marched towards the city of Balanjar. The city already witnessed a failed Arab attack in 652. The strong fortifications prevented the Arabs from capturing it. After 70 years of that defeat, its defenses were dismantled. The inhabitants of the town were surprised by Al-Jarrah's invasion and defended the town using 3,000 wagon barricades tied together on high ground around Balanjar. Behind the wagons was the Khazar army defending itself.

The Umayyads began their assault on the Khazars but soon found themselves in a difficult position. A heavy barrage of arrows bombarded the Umayyads. One of the soldiers began exhorting his men to fight, in which he was joined by the rest. They charged against the wagons under a barrage of arrows, which reportedly covered the sunlight. They made their way up the hill. Some of them managed to cut the ropes that bound the wagons together and drag them down the hill slope. This caused a gap for the Umayyads, which they quickly charged at. Both sides fought bravely, but the Khazars were defeated; many were killed and captured, and soon Balanjar fell to the Muslims on 21 August.

The governor of Balanjar escaped with 50 men. His camp, along with all his property, wives, and children, fell to the victors. The booty was so great that each Arab horseman received property worth 300 dinars. The family of the governor was released by Al-Jarrah and granted safe conduct to Khazaria.

== Aftermath ==
The neighboring towns were subjugated, and the majority of the inhabitants of Balanjar emigrated north. The Umayyads then continued their campaign, marching all the way to Samandar. However, they retreated on the approach of a large Khazarian army. Al-Jarrah would continue his operations against the Khazars in the following years.

== Sources ==
- Dunlop, D. M (1954), The history of the Jewish Khazars.
- Artamonov, M. I. (1962). История хазар [History of the Khazars].
- Khalid Yahya Blankinship (1994), The End of the Jihâd State, The Reign of Hishām Ibn ʻAbd Al-Malik and the Collapse of the Umayyads.
