= Battle of Balanjar =

Battle of Balanjar may refer to several battles in or near Balanjar:

- Battle of Balanjar (650s CE), the culminating battle of the First Khazar-Arab War
- Battle of Balanjar (723 CE), the attack on, and sack of, Balanjar by the Umayyad Caliphate under al-Djarrah ibn Abdullah
- Battle of Balanjar (730s CE), another attack under Maslamah ibn Abd al-Malik, c. 732 CE
