= Malakpur Azizal =

ڈھوک سخی
- Dhoke sakhi
- Location within Pakistan
- Coordinates: 33.30°N 73.16°E
- Country: Pakistan
- Province: Islamabad C.T
- Elevation: 522 m (1,713 ft)
- Time zone: UTC+5 (PST)

Malakpur Azizal (Arabic: ڈھوک سخی) is a village in the Islamabad Capital Territory of Pakistan. It is located at 33° 30' 0N 73° 16' 20E with an altitude of 522 metres (1715 feet). It gets its name from the Azizal clan of the Tarkhan tribe, who make up a significant part of the population. Other clans include the Maknial and Koknial, also of the Tarkhan tribe.
