= Al-Jarrah ibn Abdallah =

Arab nobleman and general of Hakami

Al-Jarrah ibn Abdallah al-Hakami

Personal details
- Born: Jund al-Urdunn
- Died: 9 December 730 Ardabil
- Relations: Al-Hajjaj (brother)
- Parent: Abdallah
- Nickname(s): "Hero of Islam" "Cavalier of the Syrians"; Abu Uqba

Military service
- Allegiance: Umayyad Caliphate
- Years of service: before 696 – 730
- Rank: General
- Battles/wars: Campaign against Ibn al-Ash'ath's rebellion; Arab–Khazar wars

Abu Uqba al-Jarrah ibn Abdallah al-Hakami (Arabic: أبو عقبة الجراح بن عبد الله الحكمي, romanized: Abū ʿUqba al-Jarrāḥ ibn ʿAbd Allāh al-Ḥakamī) was an Arab nobleman and general of the Hakami tribe. During the course of the early 8th century, he was at various times governor of Basra, Sistan and Khurasan, Armenia and Adharbayjan. A legendary warrior already during his lifetime, he is best known for his campaigns against the Khazars on the Caucasus front, culminating in his death in the Battle of Marj Ardabil in 730.

== Early career ==
According to Baladhuri, al-Jarrah was born in Jund al-Urdunn (military district of Jordan) and probably followed Sufyan ibn al-Abrad al-Kalbi and Abd al-Rahman ibn Habib al-Hakami to Iraq in 696. The latter and al-Jarrah hailed from the Banu al-Hakam ibn Sa'd al-Ashira tribe, a branch of the Madh'hij. In 701, he fought against the rebellion of Ibn al-Ash'ath.

In 706 or a few years later he was appointed as governor of Basra under the governor of Iraq, al-Hajjaj ibn Yusuf, and remained in the post until al-Hajjaj's replacement by Yazid ibn al-Muhallab in 715. Yazid in turn named al-Jarrah as his deputy for Iraq, before he himself left for Khurasan, and in 717, Caliph Umar II (r. 717–720) appointed al-Jarrah as Yazid's successor in the governorship of Khurasan and Sistan. Al-Jarrah remained in Khurasan until March/April 719, when he was dismissed after 17 months in office due to complaints of his mistreatment of the native converts to Islam (mawali), who, despite their conversion, were still obliged to pay the poll-tax (jizya). He was replaced by his deputy, Abd al-Rahman ibn Nu'aym al-Ghamidi. The most notable event of his tenure was the beginning of the covert missionary activity (da'wah) by the agents of the Abbasids in Khurasan. After his return to Iraq, in 720, he seems to have fought alongside Maslamah ibn Abd al-Malik in the suppression of the rebellion of Yazid ibn al-Muhallab.

== In the Caucasus ==
Map of the Caucasus region c. 740

In 721/2, the main phase of the Second Arab–Khazar War began on the Caucasus front. In the winter of this year, 30,000 Khazars launched an invasion of Armenia and inflicted a crushing defeat on the army of the local governor Mi'laq ibn Saffar al-Bahrani at Marj al-Hijara in February/March 722. In response, Caliph Yazid II (r. 720–724) sent al-Jarrah with 25,000 Syrian troops to Armenia, placing him in command of the Umayyad offensive against the Khazars. Al-Jarrah was swiftly successful in driving the Khazars back across the Caucasus, and fought his way north along the western coast of the Caspian Sea, recovering Derbent and advancing onto the Khazar capital of Balanjar. The Khazars tried to defend the city by ringing the citadel with a laager of wagons, but the Arabs broke it apart and stormed the city on 21 August 722 (or 723). Most of Balanjar's inhabitants were killed or enslaved, but a few managed to flee north. The Arabs also took the town of Wabandar, and even approached Samandar (near modern Kizlyar).

Despite these successes, the Arabs could not achieve a decisive result. The main Khazar army remained intact and a constant threat, since like all nomad forces it was not dependent on cities for supplies. Coupled with the fact that his rear was still insecure, al-Jarrah was forced to abandon any attempt at capturing Samandar as well, and to retreat to Warthan south of the Caucasus. From there he asked for reinforcements from Yazid, but although the Caliph promised to send more troops, he failed to do so. The sources are obscure on al-Jarrah's activity in 723, but he seems to have led another campaign north (which may indeed be the true date of the Balanjar campaign). In response, the Khazars raided south of the Caucasus, but in February 724, al-Jarrah inflicted a crushing defeat on them in a battle between the rivers Cyrus and Araxes that lasted for several days. Al-Jarrah followed up his success by capturing Tiflis, whose inhabitants were obliged to pay the kharaj but received a charter of rights in return. This campaign brought Caucasian Iberia and the lands of the Alans under Muslim suzerainty, and al-Jarrah became the first Muslim commander to march through the Darial Pass in the process. This expedition secured the Muslims' own flank against a possible Khazar attack through the Darial, while conversely it gave the Muslim army a second invasion route into Khazar territory.

In 725, however, the new Caliph Hisham ibn Abd al-Malik (r. 724–743) replaced al-Jarrah with his own brother Maslamah ibn Abd al-Malik.

== Recall to the Caucasus and death ==
In 729, after a mixed performance against the Khazars, Maslamah was replaced yet again as governor of Armenia and Adharbayjan by al-Jarrah. For all his energy, Maslamah's campaigning failed to produce the desired results: by the time of his dismissal, the Arabs had lost control of northeastern Transcaucasia and been thrust once more into the defensive, with al-Jarrah again having to defend Adharbayjan against a Khazar invasion.

In 730, al-Jarrah returned to the offensive through Tiflis and the Darial Pass. Arab sources report that he reached as far as the Khazar capital, al-Bayda, on the Volga, but modern historians such as Khalid Yahya Blankinship consider this improbable. Soon after, he was forced back to Bardha'a to defend Arran from invasion by the Khazar general Tharmach. It is unclear whether the Khazars moved through the Darial Pass or the Caspian Gates, but they succeeded in outmanoeuvring al-Jarrah, bypassing the Arab forces and laying siege to Ardabil, the capital of Adharbayjan, where 30,000 Muslim troops and their families were gathered. News of this development forced al-Jarrah to hastily withdraw from Bardha'a and march south in a rapid march to Ardabil's rescue. Outside the city walls, after a three-day battle on 7–9 December 730, al-Jarrah's army of 25,000 was all but annihilated by the Khazars under Barjik, with al-Jarrah himself falling in the field. Command passed to al-Jarrah's brother al-Hajjaj, who was unable to prevent the sacking of Ardabil, or to check Khazar raids that reached as far as south as Mosul. The experienced general Sa'id ibn Amr al-Harashi was put in command and soon succeeded in driving back the invasion, while under the leadership of Marwan ibn Muhammad (the future Marwan II) the war was concluded in a nominal Arab victory in 737.

Al-Jarrah's death caused widespread lamentation in the Muslim world, particularly among the soldiers, as he had achieved a legendary status already during his lifetime: the "paradigmatic general" (Patricia Crone), he had an impressive physical presence—according to tradition, he was so tall that when he entered the Great Mosque of Damascus, his head seemed to be suspended from the lamps—and his military prowess was celebrated with the sobriquets "hero of Islam" (Baṭal al-Islām) and "Cavalier of the Syrians" (Fāris Ahl al-Shām).

== Sources ==
- Blankinship, Khalid Yahya (1994). The End of the Jihâd State: The Reign of Hishām ibn ʻAbd al-Malik and the Collapse of the Umayyads. Albany, New York: State University of New York Press. ISBN 978-0-7914-1827-7.
- Brook, Kevin Alan (2006). The Jews of Khazaria (Second ed.). Plymouth: Rowman & Littlefield Publishers, Inc. ISBN 978-0-7425-4982-1.
- Crone, Patricia (1980). Slaves on Horses: The Evolution of the Islamic Polity (1980 ed.). Cambridge: Cambridge University Press. ISBN 978-0521229616.
- Dunlop, D. M. (1965). "al- D̲j̲arrāḥ b. ʿAbd Allāh". In Lewis, B.; Pellat, Ch. & Schacht, J. (eds.). The Encyclopaedia of Islam, Second Edition. Volume II: C–G. Leiden: E. J. Brill. p. 482. doi:10.1163/1573-3912_islam_SIM_2012. OCLC 495469475.
- Powers, David S., ed. (1989). The History of al-Ṭabarī, Volume XXIV: The Empire in Transition: The Caliphates of Sulaymān, ʿUmar, and Yazīd, A.D. 715–724/A.H. 96–105. SUNY Series in Near Eastern Studies. Albany, New York: State University of New York Press. ISBN 978-0-7914-0072-2.
- Rowson, Everett K., ed. (1989). The History of al-Ṭabarī, Volume XXII: The Marwānid Restoration: The Caliphate of ʿAbd al-Malik, A.D. 693–701/A.H. 74–81. SUNY Series in Near Eastern Studies. Albany, New York: State University of New York Press. ISBN 978-0-88706-975-8.

Preceded by Yazid ibn al-Muhallab	Governor of Khurasan and Sistan; 717–719	Succeeded by Abd al-Rahman ibn Nu'aym al-Ghamidi
Preceded by Mi'laq ibn Saffar al-Bahrani	Governor of Armenia and Adharbayjan; 722–725	Succeeded by Maslamah ibn Abd al-Malik
Preceded by Maslamah ibn Abd al-Malik	Governor of Armenia and Adharbayjan; 729–730	Succeeded by Sa'id ibn Amr al-Harashi
