= Abd al-Rahman ibn Rabi'a =

Arab general of the Rashidun Caliphate

- عبدالرحمن بن ربيعة
- Died: 652; Balanjar
- Relatives: Salman ibn Rabiah
- Military career
- Allegiance: Rashidun Caliphate
- Nickname: Dhu'l-Nun or Dhu'l-Nur
- Conflicts: Muslim conquest of Persia; Arab–Khazar wars †

ʿAbd al-Raḥmān ibn Rabīʿa al-Bāhilī (Arabic: عبد الرحمن بن ربيعة الباهلي) was a prominent Arab general of the Rashidun Caliphate, who led the Arab forces during the First Arab–Khazar War and the early Islamic conquests of the 7th century. He served under the Rashidun Caliphate and led expeditions that aimed to expand Muslim control northward. He led significant battles and encounters with the Khazar Khaganate. His campaigns in the Caucasus were marked by both military successes and setbacks, reflecting the challenges of warfare in the mountainous terrain. Abd al-Rahman's died in 652 along with 4,000 of his men, following a siege on the city of Balanjar.

== Life ==
A member of the Bahila tribe, Abd al-Rahman ibn Rabi'a was also known as Dhu'l-Nur or Dhu'l-Nun after his sword. He was the older brother of Salman ibn Rabi'a. He served with Sa'd ibn Abi Waqqas at the Battle of Qadisiyya against the Sassanid Persians, and then as a qadi at the Arab garrison town of Kufa until 641.

From 642 until his death in 652, Abd al-Rahman was active in the Muslim advances into the Caucasus region. In the sources, his activities there are often confused with those of Salman, who also served in the area. In 642, he led the vanguard of Suraqa ibn Amr, who was charged with the conquest of the strategically located Persian fortress of Derbent. According to the History of the Prophets and Kings of al-Tabari, the Persian governor of Derbent, Shahrbaraz, offered to surrender the fortress to the Arabs and even to aid them against the unruly native Caucasian peoples, if he and his followers were relieved of the obligation to pay the jizya tax. The proposal was accepted and ratified by Caliph Umar (r. 634–644).

Suraqa died soon after, and Abd al-Rahman remained in command at Derbent, which became an Arab base of operations against the powerful Khazar Khaganate to the north. Against the advice of Shahrbaraz, over the following years, he led raids north of Derbent, into the vicinity of the Khazar town of Balanjar and against various tribes of the North Caucasus, of which few details are recorded. Al-Tabari reports that in 643, Abd al-Rahman advanced as far as al-Bayda on the Volga, which in later times was the Khazar capital. Both this dating and the improbable claim that the Arabs suffered no casualties have been disputed by modern scholars.

In 652, he led a major assault on Balanjar, and besieged the city. Abd al-Rahman and his army were met by a large Khazar force and were annihilated. Abd al-Rahman and 4,000 of his men died, the rest fleeing to Derbent under the command of his brother, Salman. This defeat marked the end of the First Arab–Khazar War.

After his death, the Khazars reportedly kept his body in a cauldron and venerated it, claiming that it could be used to bring rain or drought, and ensured victory in war. In later local tradition, Abd al-Rahman and Salman became known as Ibrahim and Salman Bahili, who in 661/2 fought against the "Emperor of China".

== Sources ==
- Artamonov, M. I. (1962). История хазар [History of the Khazars] (in Russian). Leningrad: Издательство Государственного Эрмитажа. OCLC 490020276.
- Dunlop, Douglas M. (1954). The History of the Jewish Khazars. Princeton, New Jersey: Princeton University Press. OCLC 459245222.
- Dunlop, D. M. (1960). "al-Bāhilī". In Gibb, H. A. R.; Kramers, J. H.; Lévi-Provençal, E.; Schacht, J.; Lewis, B. & Pellat, Ch. (eds.). The Encyclopaedia of Islam, Second Edition. Volume I: A–B. Leiden: E. J. Brill. p. 921. doi:10.1163/1573-3912_islam_SIM_1047. OCLC 495469456.
- Golden, Peter B. (2014). "al-Bāhilī, ʿAbd al-Raḥmān b. Rabīʿa". In Fleet, Kate; Krämer, Gudrun; Matringe, Denis; Nawas, John; Rowson, Everett (eds.). Encyclopaedia of Islam (3rd ed.). Brill Online. doi:10.1163/1573-3912_ei3_COM_24498. ISSN 1873-9830.
