= Hazer =

Hazer may refer to:

- Who or which hazes (an old word for scaring, confusing, harassing), such as
  - The bull dogger's partner in steer wrestling, a rodeo discipline
  - A senior who participates in hazing at the expense of a pledge, as in a fraternity
  - A haze machine for stage lighting
- A proper noun, such as
  - Among Khazars, as their ruler Hazer Tarkhan
