= Hazer Tarkhan =

General of Khazaria

Hazer Tarkhan was a general (tarkhan is both a military rank and, in some cases, a personal name) who led a Khazar army of 40,000 men to confront Marwan II during Arab-Khazar Wars in 737 CE.

After Barjik's death, the Khazar defense instantly collapsed. Alp Tarkhan managed to defeat Maslama, but he was replaced by future caliph Marwan II who defeated Alp Tarkhan who was slain in the battle.

Khagan, probably Bihar or Baghatur, left an army in the capital and retreated north. Marwan, despite great difficulties, bypassed the capital and marched directly into lands of Bolghars, vassals of Khazars, trying to find the Khagan. On his way he encountered a Burtasid army and defeated them. Throughout the whole time, he was being chased by Hazer Tarkhan.

At one point, Hazer Tarkhan separated himself from the main army with a group of soldiers to do hunting near a river. He was ambushed and killed by Kawthar, the lieutenant of Marwan ibn Muhammad (later Caliph Marwan II). Following his death Marwan demanded a peace from Khazars.
