= Tar'mach =

General of Khazaria

Tar'mach was a Khazar general, active in the Arab–Khazar Wars of the 720s and 730s CE. He was sent by Parsbit to invade Armenia in 730.

== Sources ==
- Golden, Peter B. Khazar Studies: An Historico-Philological Inquiry into the Origins of the Khazars. Budapest: Akadémiai Kiadó, 1980.
