= Ras Tarkhan =

Ras Tarkhan was a Khazar general of the mid 8th century, sometimes referred to as As Tarkhan.

He led an invasion of Abbasid territories in Armenia, Caucasian Albania and northwestern Persia. He defeated the Arabs in the Battle of Shirvan and ensur the dominance of the Khazar Khanate in the Caucasus, and this battle was the end of the Khazar-Arab Wars.

Scholars have debated over whether Ras Tarkhan is a name or a title. As Tarkhan, used as a title, would mean "general of the Alans", possibly indicating a role as commander of Alan mercenaries or auxiliaries.

According to Zeki Validi Togan and Peter Benjamin Golden, Ras Tarkhan came from a clan called Khatiriltber.
