= Hakami =

The Hakami (Arabic: الحكمي) tribe is an Arabian tribe influential in early Muslim politics, particularly during the Umayyad Caliphate. Prior to the rise of Islam, their territory is in south and western Arabia. Some of its best known members include:

- Al-Jarrah bin Abdullah Al-Hakami, Umayyad general who fought (and was slain by) the Khazars.
- Abu Nuwas The famous poet during the Abbasi Dynasty. His name is Al-Hasan bin Hani' Al-Hakami.
