= Baranjars =

Baranjars (Balanjars, Belenjers) were a confederacy of Turkic tribes who flourished in the early Middle Ages. They are first mentioned in Arab chronicles of the 7th century. They were supposedly settled in the northern Caucasus Mountains in the 370s CE, having come to Europe with the nomadic Huns. From the second half of the 6th century they were subjected to the Göktürk Khaganate. After the collapse of the Göktürk power in the 630s they formed a state centred on the town of Balanjar on the lower Terek and Sulak rivers in Daghestan and along the western shore of the Caspian Sea. Their independence was short-lived, however, and by the end of the 630s they were incorporated into the Bulgar Khaganate and later the Khazar Khanate. In the ninth and tenth centuries, some Baranjars resettled in Volga Bulgaria, to the environs of Bilär and later were absorbed into the Volga Bulgarian nation.
