= Alp Tarkhan =

King of Khazaria

- Military career
- Allegiance: Khazar
- Rank: General
- Conflicts: Khazar-Arab Wars

Alp Tarkhan was a Khazar general active in the Khazar-Arab Wars of the early 8th century. It is unclear whether "Alp Tarkhan" is a name or a title. The Old Turkic word Alp means hero, and was an element in such names as Alp Arslan, but could also be used as a title for a victorious general. Similarly, Tarkhan or "warlord" could be used as both a personal name and a military rank.
