= Battle of Marj Ardabil =

730 battle of the Second Arab-Khazar War

- Part of the Second Arab–Khazar War
Date	7–9 December 730
Location	Ardabil
Result	Khazar victory

Belligerents
Khazar Khaganate	Umayyad Caliphate

Commanders and leaders
Barjik	al-Jarrah ibn Abdallah †

Strength
30,000–300,000	25,000

Casualties and losses
Unknown	20,000–24,300 killed

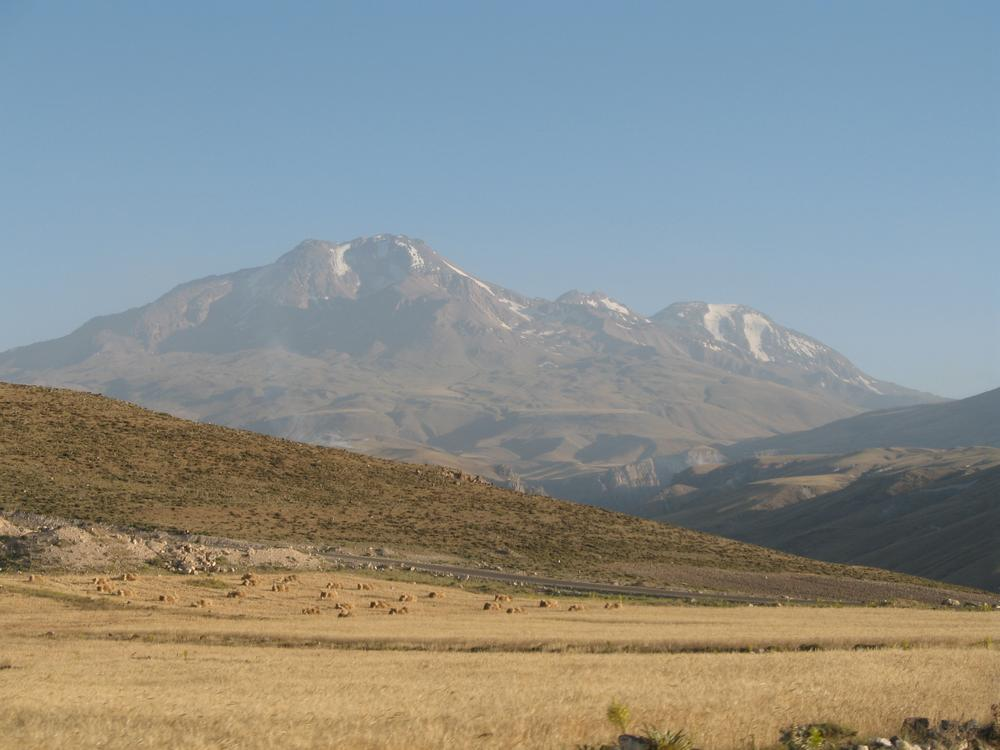
Mount Sabalan.

The Battle of Marj Ardabil was a military engagement between the Umayyads and the Khazars in AD 730. A Khazar army led by Barjik, the Khazar Khagan, inflicted a catastrophic defeat on the Umayyads, killing the majority of the army and its leader, al-Jarrah ibn Abdallah. Afterwards, the Khazars sacked Azerbaijan freely at will.

== Background ==
In the year 726, the Umayyad Caliph removed the governor of Armenia and Azerbaijan, al-Jarrah ibn Abdallah, from his post and appointed Maslama ibn Abd al-Malik. Maslama was skilled and possessed a reputation for being an effective general. Despite his successful campaigns against them, he failed to fully halt their raids. This prompted the Caliph to remove Maslama and reappoint Al-Jarrah for the governance back again in 729.

== Battle ==
In the year 730, the Khazars launched their counterattack against the Umayyads. The Khazars numbered 30,000 men under the command of the Khagan, Barjik. They advanced to the town called Warathan and besieged it. Al-Jarrah marched to relieve the town but failed to dislodge the Khazars. Since the Arabs were inferior in numbers, a native advised the general to retreat to Ardabil and make a defensive position on Mount Sabalan. Al-Jarrah instead chose to engage the Khazars on the plain of Ardabil. Both sides began making preparations for battle. The Umayyad army was in a weak position; many of the troops were irregulars and levies. The Khazars were in high morale.

The battle started on December 7 of the same year. The following two days were fierce and bloody. The large number of the Khazars gave them an advantage by the end of the second day. The majority of the Arab veterans were killed by then. On the night, the survivors of the levies from the Umayyad army escaped to Ardabil, leaving Al-Jarrah with few of his men. On the dawn of the third day, the Khazars renewed the attack; the remaining Arabs chose to remain and fight to death. Al-Jarrah was killed, and his head was decapitated. Only 100 escaped the massacre. The Khazars gained an enormous amount of booty from his camp.

Out of Al-Jarrah's army of 25,000, only 700 escaped the disaster. Agapius of Hierapolis reports that the Arabs suffered 20,000 deaths.

== Aftermath ==
The defeat at Marj Ardabil was disastrous for the Umayyads. The Khazars followed up with their victory and attacked Ardabil, capturing and sacking it, massacring the men, and enslaving women and children. Around 40,000 civilians were enslaved from Ardabil. The Khazars proceeded to ravage the entirety of Azerbaijan and reached Mosul in northern Iraq.

The disaster prompted the Caliph Hisham ibn Abd al-Malik to appoint Sa'id ibn Amr al-Harashi as the general to deal with the dangerous threat. The Caliph gave him 100,000 dirhams to recruit men from places around the Caliphate. Sa'id then marched to Azerbaijan and intercepted the Khazars, successfully evicting them out of Armenia and Azerbaijan and rescuing some of the prisoners lost.

== Sources ==
- Dunlop, D. M (1954), The history of the Jewish Khazars.
- Ian Heath (2015), Armies of the Dark Ages.
- Khalid Yahya Blankinship (1994), The End of the Jihâd State, The Reign of Hishām Ibn ʻAbd Al-Malik and the Collapse of the Umayyads.
