= Bulchan =

Khazar general around the year 800 CE

Bulchan (Bulčan) or Bluchan (Blučan) was, according to Georgian chronicles, a Khazar general around the year 800 CE. According to the Georgian sources, Bulchan led the Khazar army in its capture of Tbilisi. As part of the surrender terms a Georgian princess named Shushan was supposed to accompany Bulchan back to the khagan's court and marry the Khazar ruler, but the girl killed herself instead. When he returned home with the news, the hapless Bulchan was killed by the khagan in a fit of rage.

The connection between Bulchan and Bulan, if any, is unknown; Peter B. Golden has commented on the common etymological roots of the two names.

== Sources ==
- Golden, Peter. Khazar Studies: An Historio-Philological Inquiry into the Origins of the Khazars. Budapest: Akadémiai Kiadó, 1980.
