= Tarki =

Tarki Тарки
- Urban-type settlement

Other transcription(s)
  - Kumyk: Таргъу
- Interactive map of Tarki
- Location of Tarki Tarki (Republic of Dagestan)
- Coordinates: 42°56′50″N 47°29′55″E
- Country: Russia
- Federal subject: Dagestan
- Administrative district: Sovetsky City District
- Urban-type settlement status since: 1958

Population (2010 Census)
  - Total: 15,356
  - Estimate (2025): 18,520 (+20.6%)

Administrative status
  - Subordinated to: City of Makhachkala

Municipal status
  - Urban okrug: Makhachkala Urban Okrug
- Time zone: UTC+3 (MSK)
- Postal code: 367904
- OKTMO ID: 82701370056

Tarki population
- 2010 Census: 15,356
- 2002 Census: 9,858
- 1989 Census: 3,743
- 1979 Census: 8,090

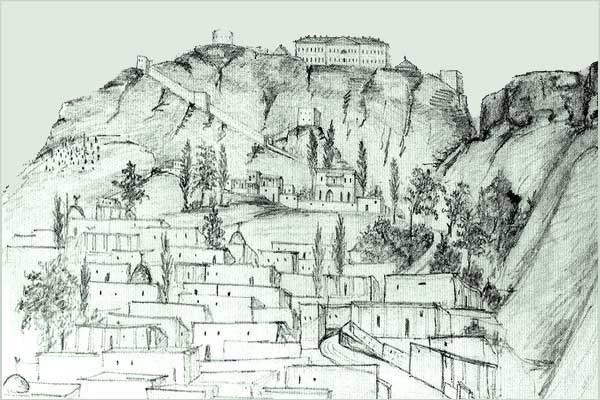
Tarki, view from the Caspian Sea, 1839, Milyutin.

Tarki (Kumyk: Таргъу, Tarğu; Russian: Тарки́) formerly also spelled Tarkou and also known as Tarku, is an urban locality (an urban-type settlement) under the administrative jurisdiction of Sovetsky City District of the City of Makhachkala in the Republic of Dagestan, Russia, located on the Tarki-tau (Kumyk: Tarğu-taw) mountain. As of the 2010 Census, its population was 15,356.

== History ==
Tarki had been the capital of Kumyk historical states before they were abolished by Russia.

According to some scholars, Tarki sits on the site of Samandar, the capital of Khazaria until the early 8th century. In 1396, Timur passed through Tarki during the Tokhtamysh–Timur war. In the Middle Ages the Shamkhalate state is formed, lately becoming Shamkhalate of Tarki. Tarki had been the capital of the Kumyk state at least from the 16th century. This state was not abolished until 1867.

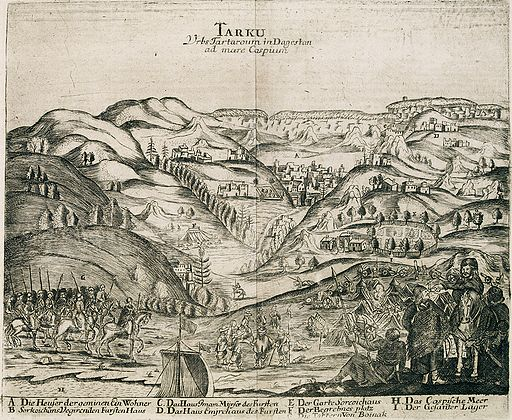
Engraving of Tarki in a publication of German traveler Adam Olearius' travel account

Tarki is mentioned by Armenian chronicles of the 7-8th century, by Giovanni Carpini in the Catalan Atlas of 1375, and by Timurid historians.

The shamkhals submitted to Russian authority more than once, first in the early 17th century. In 1668, the town was sacked by Cossacks under Stepan Razin.

The shamkhals were again obliged to submit to Russian suzerainty during Peter the Great's 1722 Persian Expedition and during Catherine the Great's 1796 Persian Expedition.

Tarki finally came under Russian control under the terms of the Treaty of Gulistan in 1813. Eight years later, the Russians built Burnaya Fortress there, which was succeeded by Fort-Petrovsk (on the grounds of original Kumyk town called Andzhi-kala (or Anji), now known as Makhachkala.

=== Deportation ===
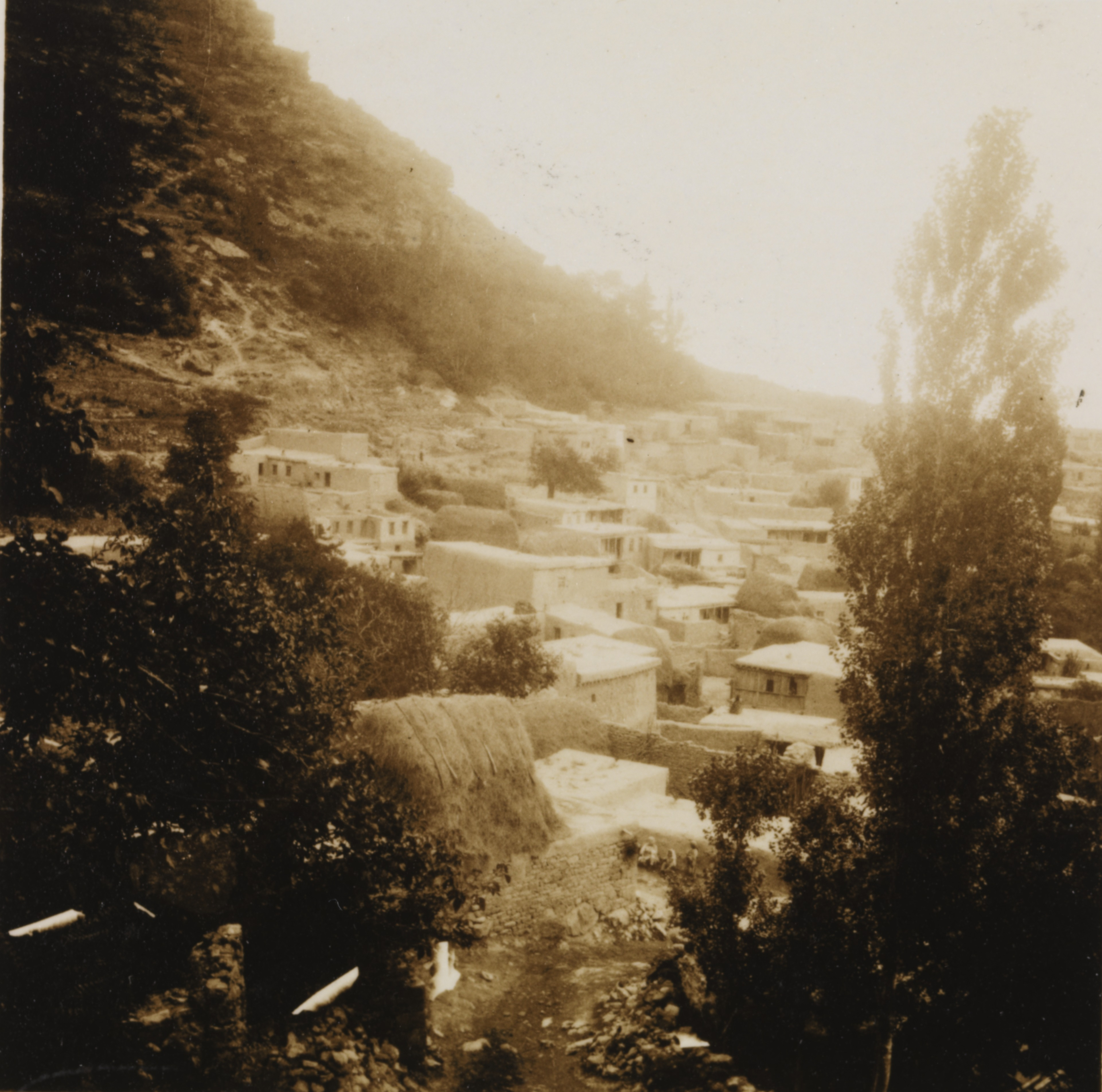
Tarki in 1925

On 12 April 1944, the Kumyks of Tarki and adjacent villages of Kyakhulay and Alborukent were rounded up and deported from their homes on the orders of the Dagestan communist authorities. They were forcibly relocated to land belonging to neighboring Chechen, Karachay, Balkar and Crimean Tatar populations, who had themselves also been forcibly deported to Central Asia two months prior, on Stalin's orders. The rationale given for the deportation of the Kumyks was that the authorities hoped to use the area to support the agricultural needs of the highland peoples who had resettled in Tarki. As a result of this exodus, the local Kumyk population lost for years their traditional capital of Tarki, which led to the destruction of some of their cultural inheritance.

The deportation of the Kumyks is still not acknowledged by the Russian government, and has become a subject of greater contention in recent years. In an attempt to settle an unrelated land dispute between local Chechen and Lak communities, the Dagestan government announced in 2017 that it had built 3,000 houses for the Laks, on land which formerly belonged to Kumyks in Tarki. This led to a protest camp being established by the Kumyk community, in an attempt to finally secure restitution for their deportation in 1944, and prevent this land from being given to a different community without their consent.

== Administrative and municipal status ==
Urban-type settlement status was granted to Tarki in 1958.

Within the framework of administrative divisions, the urban-type settlement of Tarki is in jurisdiction of Sovetsky City District of the City of Makhachkala. Within the framework of municipal divisions, Tarki is a part of Makhachkala Urban Okrug.

== See also ==
- Shamkhalate of Tarki
