= Salman ibn Rabi'a =

Salman ibn Rabi'a al-Bahili
- سلمان بن ربيعة الباهلي
- Died: 650
- Relatives: Abd al-Rahman ibn Rabi'a

Salman ibn Rabi'a al-Bahili (Arabic: سلمان بن ربيعة الباهلي) (died 650) was military governor of Armenia 633–644 CE, under Caliph Uthman ibn Affan. He may have been the brother of Abd ar-Rahman ibn Rabiah, who led the attempted conquest of the northern Caucasus Mountains and Khazaria.

Under Uthman, the Muslim armies headed into Armenia for the first time, launching from Syria and led by Habib ibn Maslama al-Fihri. They conquered several Armenian territories but were challenged by large numbers of Byzantines joining the Armenian defense. Habib asked Uthman for help, and he sent 6,000 men led by Salman, marching from Kufa, Iraq. A dispute arose between Habib and Salman, and Uthman wrote to them and solved the issue with Salman taking over command of the Muslim armies and being appointed as governor of Armenia. Salman then penetrated deep into Armenia as far as Khazaria with several conquests and victories with his force of 10,000 men. He was stopped in a fierce battle with the Khazars, reported to be 300,000 strong, and Salman and all of his troops were killed.
