= Gənzə, Nakhchivan =

Gənzə
- Municipality
- Location within Azerbaijan
- Coordinates: 38°56′31″N 46°03′16″E
- Country: Azerbaijan
- Autonomous republic: Nakhchivan
- District: Ordubad

Population (2005)
  - Total: 1,380
- Time zone: UTC+4 (AZT)

Gənzə (also, Ganza until 2003, Kənzə, Kyanza, Kanza and Kanzak) is a village and municipality in the Ordubad District of Nakhchivan, Azerbaijan. It is located 12 km in the north-east from the district center. Its population is busy with gardening and animal husbandry. There are secondary school, club, library and a medical center in the village. It has a population of 1,380.

== Etymology ==
The researchers have different opinions about the toponym of Ganza. Although, for some scholars the word has origin in Persian word گنج Ganj meaning treasure. Most of them believe that this is the same root with the name of the city of Ganja.
