= Thomas S. Noonan =

American historian

Thomas Schaub Noonan (January 20, 1938 – June 15, 2001) was an American historian, Slavicist and anthropologist who specialized in early Russian history and Eurasian nomad cultures.

Educated at Indiana University, Noonan was, for many years, a Professor of History at the University of Minnesota. He was the author of dozens of books and articles and one of the leading authorities on the development of the Kievan Rus and the Khazar Khaganate. Noonan placed a great deal of importance on numismatics in understanding economic and social trends. He was the mentor of numerous scholars and leading historians. In 2001 many of his colleagues honored him by publishing the first of a multivolume collection of articles under the title "Festschrift in Honor of Thomas S. Noonan," which was edited by Roman K. Kovalev and Heidi M. Sherman. The second volume appeared in 2005.

Noonan died of cancer in 2001.

== Selected bibliography ==
=== Kievan Rus and early Russia ===
- Noonan, Thomas S. The Nature of Medieval Russian-Estonian Relations, 850-1015 (1974).
- Noonan, Thomas S. Medieval Russia, the Mongols, and the West: Novgorod's relations with the Baltic, 1100-1350 (1975).
- Noonan, Thomas S. Fifty Years of Soviet Scholarship on Kievan History: A Recent Soviet Assessment (1980).
- Noonan, Thomas S. "The Circulation of Byzantine Coins in Kievan Rus" Byzantine Studies/Études Byzantines 7/2 (1980): 143–181.
- Noonan, Thomas S. "Russia's Eastern Trade, 1150-1350: The Archaeological Evidence." Archivum Eurasiae Medii Aevi 3 (1983): 201–264.
- Noonan, Thomas Schaub. "When Did Rus/Rus' Merchants First Visit Khazaria and Baghdad?" Archivum Eurasiae Medii Aevi 7 (1987–1991): 213–219.
- Noonan, Thomas S. The Islamic World, Russia and the Vikings. Variorium, 1998.

=== Khazar studies ===
- Noonan, Thomas S. "Did the Khazars Possess a Monetary Economy? An Analysis of the Numismatic Evidence." Archivum Eurasiae Medii Aevi 2 (1982): 219–267.
- Noonan, Thomas S. "What Does Historical Numismatics Suggest About the History of Khazaria in the Ninth Century?" Archivum Eurasiae Medii Aevi 3 (1983): 265–281.
- Noonan, Thomas S. "Why Dirhams First Reached Russia: The Role of Arab-Khazar Relations in the Development of the Earliest Islamic Trade with Eastern Europe." Archivum Eurasiae Medii Aevi 4 (1984): 151–282.
- Noonan, Thomas S. "Khazaria as an Intermediary between Islam and Eastern Europe in the Second Half of the Ninth Century: The Numismatic Perspective." Archivum Eurasiae Medii Aevi 5 (1985): 179–204.
- Noonan, Thomas S. "Byzantium and the Khazars: a special relationship?" Byzantine Diplomacy: Papers from the Twenty-fourth Spring Symposium of Byzantine Studies, Cambridge, March 1990, ed. Jonathan Shepard and Simon Franklin, pp. 109–132. Aldershot, England: Variorium, 1992.
- Noonan, Thomas S. "What Can Archaeology Tell Us About the Economy of Khazaria?" The Archaeology of the Steppes: Methods and Strategies - Papers from the International Symposium held in Naples 9–12 November 1992, ed. Bruno Genito, pp. 331–345. Napoli, Italy: Istituto Universitario Orientale, 1994.
- Noonan, Thomas S. "The Khazar Economy." Archivum Eurasiae Medii Aevi 9 (1995–1997): 253–318.
- Noonan, Thomas S. "The Khazar-Byzantine World of the Crimea in the Early Middle Ages: The Religious Dimension." Archivum Eurasiae Medii Aevi 10 (1998–1999): 207–230.
- Noonan, Thomas S. "Les Khazars et le commerce oriental." Les Échanges au Moyen Age: Justinien, Mahomet, Charlemagne: trois empires dans l'économie médiévale, pp. 82–85. Dijon: Editions Faton S.A., 2000.
- Noonan, Thomas S. "The Khazar Qaghanate and its Impact on the Early Rus' State: The translatio imperii from Itil to Kiev." Nomads in the Sedentary World, eds. Anatoly Khazanov and André Wink, pp. 76–102. Richmond, England: Curzon Press, 2001.
