= Battle of Balanjar (652) =

Battle in 652 AD

- Part of the Arab–Khazar wars
Date	652 AD
Location	Outside Balanjar
Result	Khazar victory

Belligerents
Khazar Khaganate	Rashidun Caliphate

Commanders and leaders
Irbis Qaghan	Abd al-Rahman ibn Rabi'a †; Salman ibn Rabi'a †

Casualties and losses
Unknown	4,000 killed

The Battle of Balanjar took place during the First Khazar-Arab War between the armies of the Khazar Khaganate and the Rashidun Caliphate, whose commanding general was Abd al-Rahman ibn Rabi'a.

According to the Arab chroniclers, the Arabs captured Derbent in 642, when Abd al-Rahman ibn Rabi'a secured the surrender of the Persian governor of Derbent, Shahrbaraz. Based at Derbent, Abd al-Rahman led frequent raids against the Khazars over the following years, but these were small-scale affairs, and no event of major note is recorded in the sources.

In 652, despite the instructions of Caliph Uthman to avoid risks, Abd al-Rahman led a major invasion north, targeting the city of Balanjar. According to Al-Baladhuri and Al-Ya'qubi, however, it was his brother Salman ibn Rabi'a who led the Arab invasion.

In the subsequent siege, both sides made use of catapults and ballistae. After several days, the Khazar garrison launched a sortie, which coincided with the arrival of a large Khazar relief army. After Abd al-Rahman was killed, the Arabs collapsed, despite the efforts of his brother, Salman, to rally them. 4,000 Arabs were killed, many fled to Derbent with Salman, while others had to conduct a fighting retreat all the way to Gilan and Jurjan.

Abd al-Rahman's body was left behind. The Khazars reportedly kept it in a cauldron and venerated it, claiming that it could be used to bring rain or drought, and ensured victory in war.

== See also ==
- Battle of Balanjar (disambiguation)

== Sources ==
- Artamonov, M. I. (1962). История хазар [History of the Khazars] (in Russian). Leningrad: Издательство Государственного Эрмитажа. OCLC 490020276.
- Dunlop, Douglas M. (1954). The History of the Jewish Khazars. Princeton, New Jersey: Princeton University Press. OCLC 459245222.
