= Al-Bayda (Khazar city) =

- البيضاء (Arabic)
- Type: City

Al-Bayda is the historical location of the headquarters of the Khazar Khagan during the period of the Arab–Khazar wars in the 8th century.

== History ==
In 737, Al-Bayda was the final destination of the campaign by the Arab army led by Marwan ibn Muhammad deep into Khazar territory. Following this event, the Khazar Khagan fled from the city toward the "Slavic river" (presumably Volga or Don).

Al-Bayda appears in later lists of Khazar cities, although no specific information regarding it is provided in those sources. The name means "white" in Arabic.

== Identification ==
According to a widely held view, Al-Bayda corresponds to the Turkic city name Saryshin, and both are, in turn, identical to the western part of Atil. However, the Soviet historian A. P. Novoseltsev noted that Al-Bayda is often mentioned alongside Atil, but almost never together with another Khazar capital, Semender, whose name (Iranian in origin) also contains the word "white".

== Sources ==
- Goldelman, Menashe (1998–1999). "On the Location of the Khazarian City of Al-Bayda". Archivum Eurasiae Medii Aevi. 10: 63–71.
- Novoseltsev, A. P. (1990). "Города Хазарии". Хазарское государство и его роль в истории Восточной Европы и Кавказа [The Khazar State and Its Role in the History of Eastern Europe and the Caucasus] (in Russian). Moscow: Nauka. ISBN 5-02-009552-4.
