= Tarkhan =

Ancient Central Asian title

Tarkhan (Old Turkic: 𐱃𐰺𐰴𐰣, romanized: Tarqan, Mongolian: ᠳᠠᠷᠬᠠᠨ Darqan or Darkhan; Persian: ترخان; Chinese: 達干/達爾罕/答剌罕; Arabic: ترخان; Punjabi: ترکھاݨ; alternative spellings Tarkan, Tarkhaan, Tarqan, Tarchan, Turxan, Tarcan, Turgan, Tárkány, Tarján, Tarxan) is an ancient Central Asian title used by various Turkic, Hungarian, Mongolic, and Iranian peoples. Its use was common among the successors of the Mongol Empire and Turkic Khaganate.

== Etymology ==
The origin of the word is not known. Various historians identify the word as either East Iranian (Sogdian or Khotanese Saka) or Turkic.

Although Richard N. Frye reports that the word "was probably foreign to Sogdian", Gerhard Doerfer points out that even in Turkic languages, its plural is not Turkic (sing. tarxan → plur. tarxat), suggesting a non-Turkic origin. Taking this into consideration, the word may be derived from medieval Mongolian darqat (plural suffix -at), itself perhaps derived from the earlier Sogdian word *tarxant ('free of taxes'). A. Alemany gives the additional elaboration that the possibly related East Iranian Scytho-Sarmatian (and Alanic) word *tarxan still survives in Ossetic tærxon ('argument, trial') and tærxon kænyn ('to judge'). Harold Walter Bailey also proposes an Iranian (Khotanese Saka) root for the word, L. Rogers and Edwin G. Pulleyblank argue that the Mongolian word may have actually originated among the Xiongnu, as a pronunciation of the word recorded in Old Chinese as chanyu, which Pulleyblank argues may have originally represented a Chinese approximation of dān-ĥwāĥ for *darxan.

== History ==
As a title, Tarkhan was used among the Sogdian, Saka, Hephthalite, Turkic, and proto-Mongol peoples of Central Asia and by other Eurasian nomads. It was a high rank in the army of Timur. Tarkhans commanded military contingents (roughly of regimental size under the Turkic Khazars) and were, roughly speaking, generals. They could also be assigned as military governors of conquered regions.

The Göktürks probably adopted the title darqan from the Rourans or Avars. Oğul Tarqan (𐰆𐰍𐰞𐱃𐰺𐰴𐰣) and other tarqat (𐱃𐰺𐰴𐱃) were mentioned in the Orkhon inscription of Kul Tigin (d. c. 731 CE). They were given high honors such as entering the yurt of the khagan without any prior appointment and shown unusual ninefold pardon to the ninth generation from any crime they committed. Ras Tarkhan was a Khazar leader who served as the commander-in-chief of the Khazar army, immediately below the Khagan; the title Ras is assumed to mean 'chief' in Arabic. Bulgar steles feature various proper-noun inscriptions incorporating Tarkhan, such as Theodorou Olgou Tarkhan (Θεοδωρου ογλου τρακανου). Although the etymology of the word is unknown, it is attested under the Khitan people, whose Liao dynasty ruled most of Mongolia and North China from 916 to 1125. G. Clauson argued that Tarqan in Ancient Turkic was considered to be the supreme title and was not even, like Tegin and Shad, peculiar to the royal family, but that it was still a high title, carrying administrative responsibility.

The title has had different meanings in different times. In Uyghurs, it meant 'deputy, minister'. To Oghuz Turks, it meant 'head constable'.

Like many titles, Tarkhan also occurs as a personal name, independent of a person's rank, which makes some historical references confusing. For example, Arabic texts refer to a "Tarkhan, king of the Khazars" as reigning in the mid ninth century. Whether this is a confused reference to a military official or the name of an individual Khazar khagan remains unclear. The name is occasionally used today in Turkish and Arabic speaking countries. It is used as family name in Hungary today.

In the Mongol Empire, the darkhans were exempted from taxation, socage and requisitioning. Genghis Khan made those who helped his rise darkhans in 1206. The families of the darkhans played crucial roles later when the succession crisis occurred in Yuan dynasty and Ilkhanate. Abaqa Khan (1234–82) made an Indian Darkhan after he had led his mother and her team all the way from Central Asia to Persia safely. A wealthy merchant of Persia was made a Darkhan by Ghazan (1271–1304) for his service during the early defeat of the Ilkhan. In Russia, the Khans of the Golden Horde assigned important tasks to the Darkhan. A jarlig of Temür Qutlugh (ca. 1370–1399) authorized rights of the tarkhan of Crimea.

After suppressing the rebellion of the right three tumens in Mongolia, Dayan Khan exempted his soldiers, who participated the battle of Dalan-Terqin, from imposts and made them Darkhan in 1513. Even after the collapse of Northern Yuan dynasty with the death of Ligdan Khan in 1635, the title of darkhan continued to be bestowed on religious dignitaries, sometimes on persons of low birth. For example, in 1665, Erinchin Lobsang Tayiji, the Altan Khan of the Khalkha, bestowed the title on a Russian interpreter and requested the Tsar of Russia to exempt the interpreter from all tax obligations.

A tarkhan of the Arghun dynasty, Muhammad 'Isa Tarkhan, established the Tarkhan dynasty, which ruled Sindh from 1554 to 1591.

All craftsmen held the status of darkhan and were immune to occasional requisitions levied incessantly by passing imperial envoys. From then on, the word referred to craftsmen or blacksmiths in the Mongolian language now and is still used in Mongolia as privilege. People who served the Khagan's orda were granted the title of darkhan and their descendants are known as the darkhad in Ordos City, Inner Mongolia.

One of the seven Magyar (Hungarian) tribes was called Tarjan (Ταριάνου) according to Constantin VII's De Administrando Imperio, and it is a common geographical name used in many villages and city names.

== Notable people ==
- Tonyukuk, General commander of Second Turkic Khaganate
- Kül Tigin, a tegin of Second Turkic Khaganate, was named tarkhan posthumously
- Kül-chor, Türgesh Kaghan
- Tun Baga Tarkhan, fourth Khagan of Uyghur Khaganate
- Chorpan Tarkhan, Khazar commander
- Mirza Ghazi Beg, Ruler of Tarkhan dynasty, Sindh
- Jassa Singh Ramgarhia, Ruler of Ramgarhia Misl, Punjab

== In popular culture ==
- In C. S. Lewis' The Chronicles of Narnia series of novels, the apparent spelling variation Tarkaan is the title of a Calormen nobleman, tarkheena that of a noble woman.
- In Age of Empires II: The Conquerors, the tarkan is the Huns' unique unit with the appearance of a horseman with a torch and scourge in place of sword. Their strength is destroying buildings.
- Tarkan in the comic Tarkan is a fictional Hun warrior created by Turkish cartoonist Sezgin Burak.
- Tarkan: Golden medallion, Turkish film, 1973.
- "Tarkhan" is a military title used by recruitable allies in the 2021 action-strategy video game HighFleet
- The Bulgaria civilization in 2025's Civilization VII features the Tarkhan as a unique civilian unit.

== See also ==
- Astrakhan, a city in Russia named after a Tarkhan
- Tamantarkhan, a Khazar fortress in present-day Taman, Russia
