= Samandar (city) =

Khazar city on the Caspian Sea (6th century-960s)

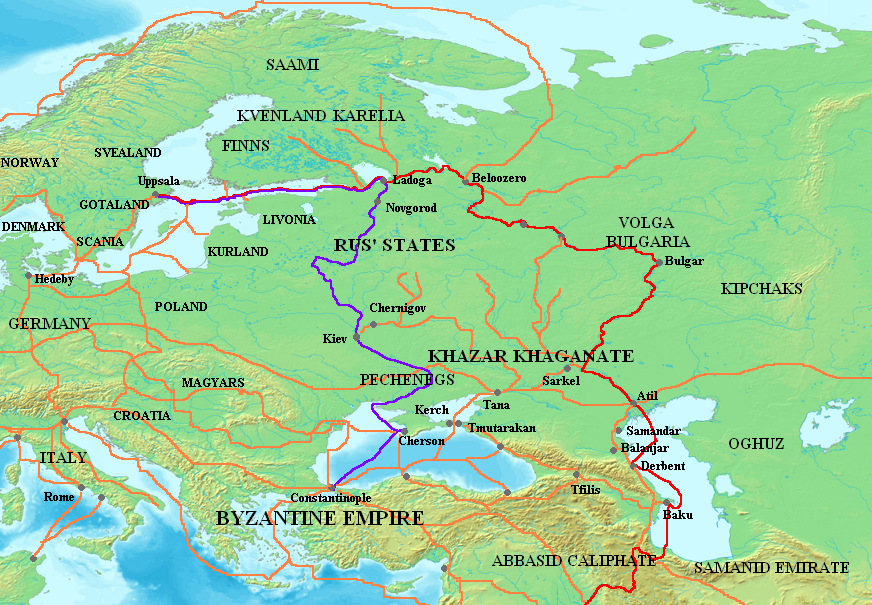
Major Varangian trade routes of the 8th–11th centuries. Samandar is on the Volga trade route (in red).

Samandar (also Semender) was a city in Khazaria (c. 650–969 CE) on the western shore of the Caspian Sea in the North Caucasus. It was the second capital of Khazaria for a brief period in the 8th century. The exact location of Samandar has not been identified; it is generally assumed to be in what is now Dagestan in southern Russia.

== Location ==
Samandar's exact location is unknown. Medieval Arabic sources report simply that it was midway between Derbent and Atil, near the shore of the Caspian Sea. Modern scholars have variously identified Samandar with Kizlyar on the Terek River, or with Tarki further south on the Caspian coast. Tarki corresponds more closely to medieval sources, as the 10th-century Hudud al-'Alam reports that Samandar was on the coast; archaeological finds from the Khazar period, including fortifications, have been discovered there.

Samander may have been moved from an original site to a different, unidentified location, possibly a hill fort in Chechnya near the present-day village of Shelkovskaya on the Terek.

== Etymology ==
The Russian scholar Svetlana Pletnyova suggested that the name "Samandar" meant "Farthest Gate" in Middle Persian, and that the town was built by the Sassanid ruler Khosrow I in the 6th century. Other scholars have proposed that the name of the city may derive from the name of a Hunnish tribe "Zabender". The Greek writer Theophylact Simocatta refers to a migration of Zabender from Asia to Europe in about 598; in addition, an Armenian book on geography attributed to Moses of Chorene mentions a town "M-s-n-d-r" in the land of Huns located to the north of Derbent.

== History ==
Samandar became the second capital of the Khazar Khaganate in the 720s, after Balanjar was abandoned as a result of the Umayyad invasion. For the same reason, the capital was moved again further north to Atil, sometime between 730 and 750.

According to the 10th-century geographers al-Istakhri and Ibn Hawqal, Samandar was inhabited by Jews, Christians, Muslims, and members of other religious faiths, each of which had its houses of worship. According to al-Istakhri, Samandar was famous for its fertile gardens and vineyards, and a lively centre of commerce with several markets; the city was mostly built of wood. Samandar, like Atil, was destroyed by Kievan Rus' prince Sviatoslav in the 960s, leading to a decline and disappearance of Khazaria.

== Sources ==
- Brook, Kevin Alan (2018). The Jews of Khazaria, Third Edition. London: Rowman & Littlefield Publishers, Inc. ISBN 9781538103425.
- Dunlop, Douglas Morton (1997). "Samandar". Encyclopaedia Judaica (CD-ROM Edition Version 1.0). Ed. Cecil Roth. Keter Publishing House. ISBN 965-07-0665-8
