= Balanjar =

Medieval city in the North Caucasus

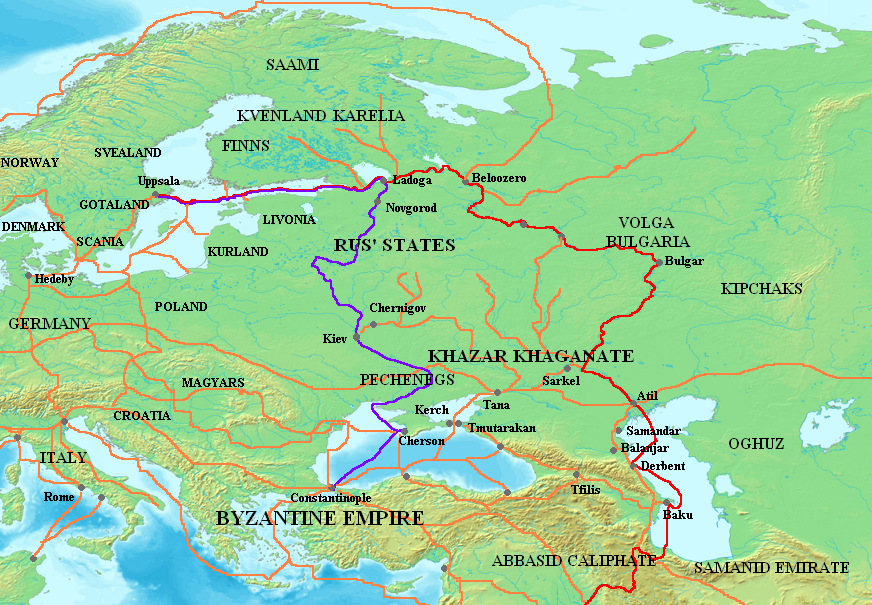
Map showing the major Varangian trade routes of the 8th–11th centuries, with Balanjar along the Volga trade route (in red).

Balanjar (Arabic: بلنجر; Baranjar, Belenjer, Belendzher, Bülünjar) was a medieval city located in the North Caucasus region, between the cities of Derbent and Samandar, probably on the lower Sulak River. It flourished between the seventh and tenth centuries. The legendary founder of Balanjar, according to the Persian and Kurdish chroniclers Ibn al-Faqih and Abu al-Fida, was named Balanjar ibn Yafith (بلنجر بن يافث).

== History ==
In the 630s Balanjar was a capital of the Baranjar state. Some scholars speculate that the name derives from the Turkic root "Bala" or "Great", and the clan-name "Endzhar". With the rest of the Baranjar domains the city became part of the Khazar Khaganate around 650; until the early 720s, Balanjar served as the capital of Khazaria. During the First Arab-Khazar War in the 650s, a Muslim army under Abd ar-Rahman ibn Rabiah was defeated outside the town (see Battle of Balanjar).

Around 722 or 723, Umayyad soldiers under Al-Jarrah ibn Abdallah crossed the Caucasus Mountains and attacked Balanjar. The inhabitants of Balanjar tried to defend their town by fastening 3,000 wagons together and circling them around the key fortress on high terrain, but were defeated in the attack. The Arabs massacred much of the town's population; survivors fled to other towns, including Samandar. The victorious Arab army stole much booty and the soldiers received large sums of money.

The city was rebuilt after the war, but the capital of Khazaria was thereafter moved to Samandar and later to Atil. Nevertheless, Balanjar continued to be a city of great importance within the Khaganate. After the fall of Khazaria, Balanjar lost much of its importance and declined steadily until it vanished from the record around 1100.

The exact location of Balanjar has not yet been established precisely. Soviet archeologist Mikhail Artamonov initially placed Balanjar on the site of the modern Daghestani city of Buynaksk, but when later the ruins of a town to the south of Makhachkala were found, he identified them as being those of Balanjar.
