= 730s =

Decade

The 730s decade ran from January 1, 730, to December 31, 739.

== Events ==
=== 730 ===
==== By place ====
====== Europe ======
- King Liutprand contracts an alliance with Eutychius, exarch of Ravenna, and agrees to support him in his attack on Rome, while subjugating the independent southern Lombard duchies of Benevento and Spoleto.
- Tiberius Petasius proclaims himself emperor in Tuscia. Eutychius defeats him with the support of Pope Gregory II, and Tiberius is killed in Monterano, with his head sent to the Byzantine emperor Leo III as a gift.
- Charles Martel defeats the last independent dukedom of Alamannia, and incorporates it into the Frankish Empire. He also launches raids on the Saxons beyond the Rhine.

====== Arabian Empire ======
- September–October – Umayyad forces sack the Byzantine fortress of Charsianon in central Anatolia (modern Turkey), which remains a contested stronghold during the next century of Byzantine–Arab warfare.
- December 9 – Battle of Marj Ardabil: The Khazars under Barjik invade the provinces of Jibal and Adharybaydjian. He defeats an Umayyad army (25,000 men) at Ardabil (Iran), killing al-Jarrah ibn Abdallah.

====== China ======
- Emperor Xuan Zong has four palace walls in the northeast sector of the capital city Chang'an dismantled and reassembled to construct a new Daoist abbey, the grounds of which are formally a large garden for the Bureau of Agriculture.

==== By topic ====
- In this decade hops are first cultivated in Germany, in the Hallertau region.

====== Religion ======
- Leo III of the Byzantine Empire orders the destruction of all icons, beginning the First Iconoclastic Period. Many monks flee to Greece and Italy (taking smaller icons with them, hidden in their clothing); others flee to the caves of the Cappadocian desert.

=== 731 ===
==== By place ====
====== Europe ======
- Umayyad conquest of Gaul: Munuza, Moorish governor of Cerdagne (eastern Pyrenees), rebels against Umayyad authority. He is defeated and executed by Muslim forces under Abdul Rahman Al Ghafiqi at Urgell (Catalonia). Muslim garrisons in Septimania raid the cities Millau and Arles.
- Ragenfrid, ex-mayor of the palace of Neustria, meets Duke Eudes of Aquitaine, to accept his rule and independence from the Frankish Kingdom. Fearing an alliance against him, Charles Martel exiles Ragenfrid's supporter Wandon of Fontenelle, and imprisons bishop Aimar of Auxerre.
- Charles Martel leads two raids across the Loire River into the Berry region. The Franks seize and plunder Bourges (central France), but the city is immediately recaptured by Eudes of Aquitaine.

====== Britain ======
- Autumn – King Ceolwulf of Northumbria is deposed by opponents, and forced to enter a monastery. His supporters subsequently restore him to the throne (or 732).
- King Æthelbald of Mercia overruns a large portion of Somerset, and wrests the county from Wessex control (approximate date).

====== Asia ======
- Battle of the Defile: An Umayyad relief army (28,000 men) is sent to Samarkand (modern Uzbekistan), which is besieged by the Turgesh. The Muslims are ambushed near the Zarafshan Range, at the Tashtakaracha Pass. The battle results in a Pyrrhic victory, with heavy casualties for the Umayyad army, halting Muslim expansion in Central Asia for almost two decades.

==== By topic ====
====== Literature ======
- Bede, Anglo-Saxon monk and historian, completes his Historia ecclesiastica gentis Anglorum at the monastery of Saint Peter at Monkwearmouth.

====== Religion ======
- February 11 – Pope Gregory II dies at Rome after a 16-year reign, in which he has fought Iconoclasm. He is succeeded by the Syrian-born cleric Gregory III, as the 90th pope of the Catholic Church.
- A Moorish raiding party under Abdul Rahman Al Ghafiqi invades deep into Burgundy, and plunders the monastery of Luxeuil Abbey, located in the Haute-Saône, massacring most of the community.
- November 1 – Synod of Rome: Gregory III summons a council at the shrine of Saint Peter. All western bishops participate, including the Roman nobility. Gregory condemns Iconoclasm as a heresy.

=== 732 ===
==== By place ====
====== Byzantine Empire ======
- Byzantine Emperor Leo III marries his 15 year old son Constantine to Tzitzak (later baptised as Irene), the daughter of the Khazar Khagan Bihar, as a sign of diplomatic unity between the Byzantine Empire and the Khazar Khaganate.

====== Europe ======
- Battle of the River Garonne: A Umayyad Muslim army (40,000 men) under Abdul Rahman Al Ghafiqi, governor of Al-Andalus, crosses the Pyrenees through the Roncesvalles Pass and raids widely, ravaging the cities of Oloron, Lescar and Bayonne, and burning the abbey of Saint-Sever. Umayyad forces destroy the monastery of Saint-Émilion, and defeat the 'Count of Libourne'. Abdul Rahman sacks and captures Bordeaux, and nearly wipes out the army of Duke Eudes of Aquitaine, at the Garonne River.
- Summer – Eudes of Aquitaine heads for the Frankish city of Reims, to warn Charles Martel, Merovingian mayor of the palace, of the Umayyad invasion in Gaul, and ask for his support against the invaders. The two leaders meet near Paris; Charles issues a 'general ban' to raise an army, which includes large numbers of Austrasians, Neustrians, and Burgundians. Meanwhile, Arabians ravage the cities of Périgueux, Saintes, and Angoulême, then sack the basilica of Saint-Hilaire outside Poitiers.
- September – Charles Martel leads his Frankish army (30,000 men) to Orléans and crosses the Loire River, probably accompanied by Eudes of Aquitaine, with his remaining troops. He makes camp near Tours, probably at Ballan-Miré south-west of the fortress city, in order to protect the abbey of Saint Martin. Charles defeats or forces back Umayyad scouts or an advance guard, between the rivers Indre and Creuse. Abdul Rahman Al Ghafiqi pulls back to establish a position at the Vienne River.
- October – The Frankish army crosses the Vienne River and establishes a camp at or around the partially abandoned Roman mansion or agricultural settlement, now known as 'Vieux-Poitiers' (near Châtellerault), perhaps using the Roman theatre with its substantial towers as a fortification. Charles Martel forms a defensive position across the Roman road, and fends off Muslim skirmishes during the 'seven days' stand-off, probably involving scouts, and perhaps raiders from both armies.
- October 10 – Battle of Tours: The Frankish and Burgundian forces under Charles Martel defeat a large army of Abdul Rahman Al Ghafiqi, near Poitiers, halting the Islamic advance into Western Europe; Rahman Al Ghafiqi is killed during the battle. Charles extends his authority in the south of France, which gives him the nickname Martellus ("The Hammer"). The outcome of the victory is a turning point, and establishes a balance of power between Western Europe and the Byzantine Empire.
- Muslim forces withdraw southwards to Septimania; a separate part probably pulls back along the road it originally came through, across the Pyrenees Mountains. Eudes of Aquitaine pursues the main Muslim army via La Marche, before returning to Bordeaux; Charles Martel withdraws to Frankish territory through Orléans and Auxerre, demoting those bishops whom he thought unreliable. Abd al-Malik ibn Katan al-Fihri becomes the new governor (wali) of Al-Andalus; a separate Muslim force raids the Rhône region.

====== Britain ======
- Autumn – King Ceolwulf of Northumbria is deposed by opponents, and forced to enter a monastery. His supporters subsequently restore him to the throne (or 731).

==== By topic ====
====== Astronomy ======
- June 26 – Venus occults Jupiter.

====== Religion ======
- Pope Gregory III confers on Boniface, Anglo-Saxon missionary, the pallium as archbishop, with jurisdiction over Bavaria (modern Germany). He orders him to forbid the consumption of horseflesh by his Christian converts.
- Ecgbert is appointed bishop of York, by his cousin Ceolwulf of Northumbria. He founds a library, and makes the city a renowned centre of learning (approximate date).

=== 733 ===
==== By place ====
====== Byzantine Empire ======
- Emperor Leo III confiscates the papal territories in Sicily and Calabria (Southern Italy), from which Pope Gregory III derives most of his income tax. He transfers ecclesiastical jurisdiction in the former Praetorian prefecture of Illyricum to Anastasius, patriarch of Constantinople. Gregory begins his support of a revolt in Italy against iconoclasm. By now the break between the papacy and the Byzantine Empire is almost complete.
- Arab-Byzantine Wars: Arab forces under Mu’awiya ibn Hisham penetrate deep into Anatolia and conquer the cities of Antalya, Doralyum and Afyonkarahisar. These conquests differ from previous ones, as Arab military settling occurs in them, making them a base to raid Byzantium.

====== Europe ======
- Duke Eudes of Aquitaine, aged almost 80, abdicates and retires to a monastery. His lands are divided between his sons Hunald I and Hatton, who continue the conflict with Charles Martel, mayor of the palace of Neustria and Austrasia. In battles at Benest in Charente and La Rochefoucauld (near Angoulême), Charles probably defeats the Aquitainians. He also campaigns against the Burgundians.
- Umayyad conquest of Hispania: Muslim forces under Abd al-Malik ibn Katan al-Fihri, governor (wali) of Al-Andalus, cross the Pyrenees and ravage both sides of the mountains. He establishes colonies along the Ebro Valley, and within Basque territory. The Moorish main military efforts are in Catalonia, Aragon, Navarre and Septimania (Southern France), strengthening the towns already in their hands.
- Duke Audelais of Benevento and his minor son Gisulf are deposed by King Liutprand of the Lombards. He is succeeded by Gregory, who becomes ruler of Benevento.

=== 734 ===
==== By place ====
====== Europe ======
- Battle of the Boarn: The Franks under Charles Martel, mayor of the palace of Neustria and Austrasia, defeat the Frisians near the mouth of the River Boarn (now the Dutch province of Friesland). During the battle, the Frisian army is beaten and King Poppo is killed. The Franks gain control of the Frisian lands west of the Lauwers (Netherlands), and begin plundering the pagan sanctuaries. The Frisians become Frankish vassals, apart from the tribes living in East Frisia in present-day Germany.
- Umayyad conquest of Gaul: Muslim forces under Abd al-Malik ibn Qatn al-Fihri, governor (wali) of Al-Andalus (modern Spain), enter Provence and raid the Rhône Valley. The cities of Avignon, Arles, and probably Marseille are handed over by Count Maurontus, who is in rebellion against Charles Martel.
- September 8 – Frithubeorht is consecrated Bishop of Hexham.

====== Mesoamerica ======
- Jasaw Chan Kʼawiil I, ruler (ajaw) of Tikal (Guatemala), dies after a 52-year reign. He is succeeded by his son Yikʼin Chan Kʼawiil, who becomes one of Tikal's most successful and expansionary rulers during the Late Classic period.
- During the Third Tikal–Calakmul War, Kʼakʼ Tiliw Chan Yopaat gives himself the title k’uhul ajaw, thus declaring Quiriguá's independence from Copán.

====== Asia ======
- March 23 – A large earthquake strikes the Tang dynasty city of Qinzhou (in the vicinity of modern-day Tianshui City), causing serious damage and killing around 4000 people.
- Bilge Qaghan, khagan of the Second Turkic Khaganate, is poisoned and killed by Buyruk Chor, an emissary once sent to Tang Emperor Xuanzong. He is succeeded by his son Yollıg.
- December – Khitan military chief Ketuyu and khagan Yaonian Qulie are assassinated by their subordinate Li Guozhe, ending the Ketuyu rebellion.

=== 735 ===
==== By place ====
====== Europe ======
- Charles Martel, Merovingian mayor of the palace, invades Burgundy. Duke Hunald I of Aquitaine refuses to recognise the authority of the Franks, whereupon Charles marches south of the River Loire, seizing the cities of Bordeaux and Blaye. Within 4 years he will have subdued all the Burgundian chieftains, while continuing to fight off Moorish advances into Gaul.
- King Liutprand of the Lombards raises his nephew Hildeprand to co-kingship, after a serious illness (approximate date).
- Siege of al-Sakhra: Moors under Uqba ibn al-Hajjaj (governor of Al-Andalus) besiege Pelagius, king of Asturias, in the uppermost Northern mountain ranges in Iberia. The battle ends inconclusively, with Pelagius surviving, but 270 out of his 300 followers are killed (at least according to a Muslim chronicle from the 11th century).

====== Asia ======
- During the Tang dynasty in China, by this year there is 149,685,400 kg (165,000 short tons) of grain shipped annually along the Grand Canal.
- A major smallpox epidemic starts in Japan, which reduces the population by 30%.

====== Armenia ======
- 735 Vayots Dzor Province earthquake. It affected the Vayots Dzor Province.The earthquake reportedly destroyed an entire valley. The reported casualties included at least 10,000 victims.

==== By topic ====
====== Literature ======
- The Khöshöö Tsaidam Monuments of Bilge Khan, ruler (khagan) of the Turkic Khaganate, and his brother Kul Tigin, are erected. (Bilge has already erected Kül Tigin's monument and Bilge's son erects Bilge's monument.)

====== Religion ======
- May 26 – Bede, Anglo-Saxon monk-historian, dies at Monkwearmouth–Jarrow Abbey. He will be remembered as "the Venerable", and is the author of books that are copied and studied later all over Europe. His greatest book is the Historia ecclesiastica gentis Anglorum, a major source for the history of Britain, in the immediate post-Roman period.
- The see of York receives the pallium from pope Gregory III, and is elevated to an archbishopric. Ecgbert becomes the first archbishop.

=== 736 ===
==== By place ====
====== Europe ======
- Charles Martel, Merovingian mayor of the palace, forms local alliances with the Burgundians, and imposes Frankish domination on Provence. He defeats Muslim forces at Sernhac and Beaucaire in Septimania (Southern France).
- Battle of Nîmes: The Franks under Charles Martel fail to capture Narbonne but devastate most of the other settlements, including Nîmes, Agde, Béziers and Maguelonne, which Martel views as potential strongholds of the Umayyads.

====== Britain ======
- King Æthelbald of Mercia is described in the Ismere Diploma as ruler (bretwalda) of the Mercians, and all the provinces in southern England. He is also named "Rex Britanniae" (king of Britain).
- King Óengus I of the Picts invades the neighbouring kingdom of Dál Riata, which is subjugated. He takes the fortress of Dunadd, and establishes his rule in Scotland for over two decades.

====== Asia ======
- Rōben, scholar-Buddhist monk, invites Shinshō to give lectures on the Avatamsaka Sutra at Kinshōsen-ji (later Tōdai-ji); this event is considered to be the roots of the Kegon school of Buddhism founded in Japan.

====== Central America ======
- June 15 – Uaxaclajuun Ub'aah K'awiil ("Eighteen Rabbit"), ruler of the Mayan city state of Copán in Honduras is defeated in battle by Kʼakʼ Tiliw Chan Yopaat, the ruler of Quiriguá (in Guatemala), and is beheaded. K'ak' ("Smoke Monkey") rules until his death in 749.
- A diplomatic team from Calakmul, led by Wamaw K'awiil, meets with Quiriguá leader K’ak Tiliw Chan Yopaa, in an attempt to negotiate an end to the city's rebellion during the Third Tikal-Calakmul War.
- The Mayan city state of Tikal defeats Calakmul in what is now Guatemala, ending a centuries-long rivalry, but ushering in another century of warfare that ultimately leads to both cities' abandonment in the 9th century.
- Yik'in Chan K'awiil, ruler (ajaw) of the leading Maya city state of Tikal (modern-day Guatemala), conquers rival Calakmul, within the northern Petén region of the Yucatán region (Southern Mexico).

=== 737 ===
==== By place ====
====== Europe ======
- Battle of Avignon: Frankish forces under Charles Martel, Merovingian Mayor of the Palace, retake Avignon from the Muslim forces, and destroy the Umayyad stronghold. Charles sends his brother Childebrand I, duke of Burgundy, to besiege the city. After his arrival, Charles leads the Frankish troops by using rope ladders and battering rams to attack the fortified walls, which are burned to the ground following its capture.
- Battle of Narbonne: Frankish forces under Charles Martel besiege Narbonne, occupied by a Umayyad garrison, but are unable to retake the fortress city. A Lombard army under King Liutprand crosses the Alps, to aid Charles in expelling the Muslims from Septimania. Meanwhile Maurontus, duke or count of Provence, raises a revolt from his unconquered city of Marseille, and threatens the rear of the Franks.
- Battle of the River Berre: Frankish forces sent by Charles Martel intercept a large Muslim army sent from Al-Andalus, (modern Spain) sent by Uqba ibn al-Hajjaj to relieve the siege of Narbonne. Both sides suffer heavy losses at the battlefield near the mouth of the River Berre (a short distance south of Narbonne). Some of the Muslims rush back to their ships, and some penetrate through the Frankish forces and make it to the city, effectively saving it from the Franks.
- Following the death of Theuderic IV, king of the Franks, the throne is left vacant for seven years. Charles Martel has his son Childeric III exiled to a monastery, and becomes sole ruler of the Frankish Kingdom.
- King Pelagius of Asturias dies, and is succeeded by his son Favila. He founds the Church of Santa Cruz, in his capital Cangas de Onís (northwestern Spain).
- Orso Ipato is murdered at the instigation of Eutychius, exarch of Ravenna. He is succeeded by Domenico Leoni, who is elected magister militum of Venice.
- King Ongendus of the Danes reinforces the Danevirke fortifications in Schleswig-Holstein. He orders a palisade rampart built on the frontier of Saxony.

====== Britain ======
- King Ceolwulf of Northumbria abdicates in favour of his cousin, Eadberht, and becomes a monk at Lindisfarne Priory.

====== Africa ======
- Egypt: Christians invade from the south, with the aim of protecting the patriarch of Alexandria (approximate date).

====== Asia ======
- Second Arab–Khazar War: The Khazars led by Hazer Tarkhan are defeated by a Muslim force, sent by Marwan ibn Muhammad ibn Marwan near the Volga River, which destroyed what remained of the Khazar forces. The Umayyad Caliphate now has full control of the Caucasus after completely destroying the Khazar Empire. After its destruction the Arab-Khazar wars are stopped, Muslim sources indicate the Khazar Khan paid tribute to Marwan and converted to Islam.
- September 30 – Battle of the Baggage: The Turgesh drive back an Umayyad invasion of Khuttal, pursue them south of the River Oxus (northern Afghanistan), and capture their baggage train. In the winter, the Turgesh and their Transoxianan allies launch a major counter-invasion but are halted and their army is destroyed. Khuttal is then conquered by the Arabs.
- Emperor Xuan Zong discards the policy of conscripting men into the Chinese army to be replaced every three years, replacing them with long-service soldiers who are more battle-hardened and efficient (approximate date).

==== By topic ====
====== Catastrophe ======
- A major Japanese smallpox epidemic that started in 735 finally runs its course, but only after causing an estimated 25% to 35% mortality among the adult population in the country.

=== 738 ===
==== By place ====
====== Europe ======
- Charles Martel, Merovingian mayor of the palace, begins a campaign against the Saxons (in modern-day Westphalia) on the northeast frontier. They are subdued and must pay him tribute.
- Moors under Uqba ibn Al-Hajjaj cross the Pyrenees into France. Uqba fortifies Narbonne and reconquers Avignon, Arles, Nimes. He then advances into Provence, and penetrates as far as Piedmont; he then heads North, and conquers Dauphiné, destroying the city of Saint-Paul, taking Valence, Vienne and Lyon, which he uses as a base to attack Bourgogne.
- Kormesiy, ruler (khagan) of the Bulgarian Empire, is deposed by the nobility. He is replaced on the throne by his son Sevar, who is a descendant of the royal Dulo clan.
- Felice Cornicola is appointed hypatos (Byzantine consul) and magister militum of Venice.

====== Britain ======
- King Swæfberht of Essex dies after a 23-year reign. He is succeeded by Saelred, a minor member of the Essex royal family.

====== Mesoamerica ======
- The Mayan city-state Xukpi (Copán) is defeated by a rival city-state, Quiriguá. Xukpi leader Uaxaclajuun Ub'aah K'awiil ("Eighteen Rabbit") is deposed thereafter.

==== By topic ====
====== Religion ======
- Boniface visits Rome, and is made papal legate of the Frankish Kingdom. He establishes many bishoprics in Bavaria.

=== 739 ===
==== By place ====
====== Europe ======
- The Lombards under King Liutprand sack the Exarchate of Ravenna, and threaten Rome. Pope Gregory III asks Charles Martel, Merovingian mayor of the palace, to help fight the Lombards (he also requests assistance in fighting the Byzantines and the Arabs). Liutprand signs a peace accord, and pulls back his forces to Pavia. After the pope's appeal to the Franks, a relationship begins that will continue as the Frankish Kingdom gains power.
- Umayyad conquest of Gaul: Charles Martel attacks Duke Maurontus of Provence and his Muslim allies. His brother Childebrand captures Marseille, one of the largest cities still in Umayyad hands. Maurontus is forced to go into hiding in the Alps.
- King Favila of Asturias dies after a 2-year reign (probably killed by a bear). He is succeeded by his brother-in-law Alfonso I, husband of his sister Ermesinda.
- Duke Pemmo of Friuli is deposed by Liutprand, and succeeded by his son Ratchis. He flees with his followers, but Ratchis secures his father's pardon.
- Theodatus Ursus is appointed hypatos (Byzantine consul) and magister militum of Venice.

====== Africa ======
- The Great Berber Revolt: The Berbers break out in revolt against the Umayyad rulers at Maghreb, in response to the oppressive, (and, by Islamic law, illegal) tax-collection and slave-tribute. The rebellion is led by the chieftain (alleged water-carrier) Maysara al-Matghari. He successfully seizes Tangier, and rapidly captures much of western Morocco. The Berber rebellion which erupts not only undermines caliphal rule and fragments the wilayat or province of Ifriqiya (North Africa), but paves the way for the emergence of autonomous local Arab dynasties.

==== By topic ====
====== Religion ======
- Boniface, Anglo-Saxon missionary who has been Christianizing Bavaria, founds the bishoprics of Salzburg, Regensburg, Freising, and Passau.
- Willibrord, the first bishop of Utrecht in the Netherlands, and Northumbrian missionary, dies at Echternach (modern Luxembourg).

== Significant people ==
- Hisham
- Mu'awiya ibn Hisham
- Leo III the Isaurian
- Pope Gregory III
- Anglo-Saxon poet Cædmon active

== Births ==
730

- Al-Rabi' ibn Yunus, Arab minister (approximate date)
- Autpert Ambrose, Frankish Benedictine monk (d. 784)
- Beatus of Liébana, monk and theologian (approximate date)
- Jia Dan, general of the Tang dynasty (d. 805)
- Offa of Mercia (approximate date)
- Tarasios, patriarch of Constantinople (approximate date)
- Zhang Xiaozhong, general of the Tang Dynasty (d. 791)

731

- Abd al-Rahman I, Muslim emir of Córdoba (d. 788)
- Ōtomo no Otomaro, Japanese general and Shōgun (d. 809)
- Telets, ruler (khagan) of the Bulgarian Empire (approximate date)

732

- Fujiwara no Momokawa, Japanese statesman (d. 779)

733

- Donnchad Midi, High King of Ireland (d. 797)
- Junnin, emperor of Japan (d. 765)
- Lu Yu, Chinese author (d. 804)

734

- Fujiwara no Kurajimaro, Japanese politician (d. 775)
- Khurshid II, ruler (ispahbadh) of Tabaristan (d. 761)

735

- Abu Yusuf, Muslim jurist and chief adviser (or 738)
- Alcuin, Anglo-Saxon missionary (approximate date)
- Dantidurga, founder of the Rashtrakuta Empire (d. 756)
- Du You, chancellor of the Tang dynasty (d. 812)
- Kardam, ruler (khan) of the Bulgarian Empire
- Plato of Sakkoudion, Byzantine abbot (approximate date)

736

- Hun Jian, Chinese general
- Zhao Jing, Chinese official

737

- Fujiwara no Tanetsugu, Japanese nobleman (d. 785)
- Hisham ibn al-Kalbi, Muslim historian (d. 819)
- Huaisu, Chinese Buddhist monk (d. 799)
- Kanmu, emperor of Japan (d. 806)

738

- Abu Yusuf, Arab jurist and chief adviser (approximate date)
- Chengguan, Chinese Buddhist monk (d. 839)

739

- Lu Mai, chancellor of the Tang Dynasty (d. 798)
- Yuan Zi, chancellor of the Tang Dynasty (d. 818)

== Deaths ==
730

- December 9 – Al-Jarrah ibn Abdallah, Arab general
- Corbinian, Frankish bishop (approximate date)
- Hugh of Champagne, grandson of Pepin of Herstal
- Kʼinich Ahkal Moʼ Nahb III, Maya ruler of Palenque
- Lanfredus, duke of Alamannia
- Peter, duke of Cantabria
- Selbach mac Ferchair, king of Dál Riata
- Tiberius Petasius, Byzantine usurper
- Yuwen Rong, chancellor of the Tang Dynasty (or 731)
- Zhang Yue, chancellor of the Tang Dynasty (b. 663)

731

- February 11 – Gregory II, pope of the Catholic Church (b. 669)
- March 13 – Gerald of Mayo, Anglo-Saxon abbot
- August 31 – Ōtomo no Tabito, Japanese poet (b. 665)
- December 22 – Yuan Qianyao, official of the Chinese Tang dynasty
- date unknown
  - Barjik, prince of the Khazar Khaganate
  - Berhtwald, archbishop of Canterbury
  - Munuza, Moorish governor of Cerdagne
  - Ragenfrid, mayor of the palace of Neustria
  - Yuwen Rong, chancellor of the Tang dynasty (or 730)

732

- Abdul Rahman Al Ghafiqi, governor of Al-Andalus
- Nechtan mac Der-Ilei, king of the Picts
- Romuald II, duke of Benevento (Italy)
- Rupert of Bingen, patron saint (b. 712)
- Sima Zhen, Chinese historian (b. 679)

733

- Eochaid mac Echdach, king of Dál Riata (modern Scotland)
- Li Yuanhong, chancellor of the Tang Dynasty
- Mildrith, Anglo-Saxon abbess (approximate date)
- Muhammad al-Baqir, fifth Shia imam and descendant of Muhammad
- Yamanoue no Okura, Japanese poet (approximate date)

734

- June 3 – Simeon of the Olives, Syriac bishop of Harran (b. 624/5)
- July 30 – Tatwine, Mercian archbishop of Canterbury (b. c.670?)
- Bilge Qaghan, ruler (khagan) of the Second Turkic Khaganate (b. 683/4)
- Bilihildis, Frankish noblewoman and abbess
- Bubo, Duke of the Frisians
- Approximate date – Caintigern, Irish-born hermit
- Jasaw Chan Kʼawiil I, ruler (ajaw) of Tikal
- December – Ketuyu, Khitan military chief

735

- May 26 – Bede, Anglo-Saxon theologian and historian
- December 6 – Toneri, Japanese prince (b. 676)
- Abi Ishaq, Arab grammarian (approximate date)
- Adela, Frankish abbess (approximate date)
- Cathal mac Muiredaig, king of Connacht (Ireland)
- Cellach mac Fáelchair, king of Osraige (Ireland)
- Eudes, duke of Aquitaine (approximate date)

736

- Hugbert, duke of Bavaria
- Muiredach mac Ainbcellaig, king of Dál Riata
- Yamabe no Akahito, Japanese poet

737

- Ermin of Lobbes, Frankish abbot
- Forthhere, Anglo-Saxon bishop (approximate date)
- Fujiwara no Fusasaki, Japanese counselor (b. 681)
- Fujiwara no Maro, Japanese politician (b. 695)
- Fujiwara no Muchimaro, Japanese minister (b. 680)
- Fujiwara no Umakai, Japanese statesman (b. 694)
- Mu, king of Balhae (Korea)
- Mu'awiya ibn Hisham, Muslim general
- Orso Ipato, doge of Venice
- Pelagius, king of Asturias (Spain) (b. 685)
- Song Jing, Chancellor of the Tang dynasty (b. 663)
- Theuderic IV, king of the Franks

738

- January 26 – John of Dailam, Syrian monk (b. 660)
- May 3 – Uaxaclajuun Ub'aah K'awiil, Mayan ruler (ajaw)
- Áed mac Colggen, king of the Uí Cheinnselaig (Ireland)
- Asad ibn Abdallah al-Qasri, Arab governor
- Dluthach mac Fithcheallach, king of Uí Maine (Ireland)
- Fáelán mac Murchado, king of Leinster
- Maslama ibn Abd al-Malik, Arab general
- Suluk, Turkic ruler (khagan) of the Turgesh
- Swæfberht, king of Essex

739

- Aldwulf, Anglo-Saxon bishop
- Engelmund, Anglo-Saxon missionary
- Favila, king of Asturias (Spain)
- Nothhelm, Anglo-Saxon bishop
- Pemmo, duke of Friuli (Italy)
- Willibrord, Anglo-Saxon bishop
