= AD 737 =

Calendar year

737 in various calendars
- Gregorian calendar: 737; DCCXXXVII
- Ab urbe condita: 1490
- Armenian calendar: 186; ԹՎ ՃՁԶ
- Assyrian calendar: 5487
- Balinese saka calendar: 658–659
- Bengali calendar: 143–144
- Berber calendar: 1687
- Buddhist calendar: 1281
- Burmese calendar: 99
- Byzantine calendar: 6245–6246
- Chinese calendar: 丙子年 (Fire Rat); 3434 or 3227 — to — 丁丑年 (Fire Ox); 3435 or 3228
- Coptic calendar: 453–454
- Discordian calendar: 1903
- Ethiopian calendar: 729–730
- Hebrew calendar: 4497–4498
- Hindu calendars
- Vikram Samvat: 793–794
- Shaka Samvat: 658–659
- Kali Yuga: 3837–3838
- Holocene calendar: 10737
- Iranian calendar: 115–116
- Islamic calendar: 118–120
- Japanese calendar: Tenpyō 9 (天平９年)
- Javanese calendar: 630–631
- Julian calendar: 737; DCCXXXVII
- Korean calendar: 3070
- Minguo calendar: 1175 before ROC 民前1175年
- Nanakshahi calendar: −731
- Seleucid era: 1048/1049 AG
- Thai solar calendar: 1279–1280
- Tibetan calendar: མེ་ཕོ་བྱི་བ་ལོ་ (male Fire-Rat); 863 or 482 or −290 — to — མེ་མོ་གླང་ལོ་ (female Fire-Ox); 864 or 483 or −289

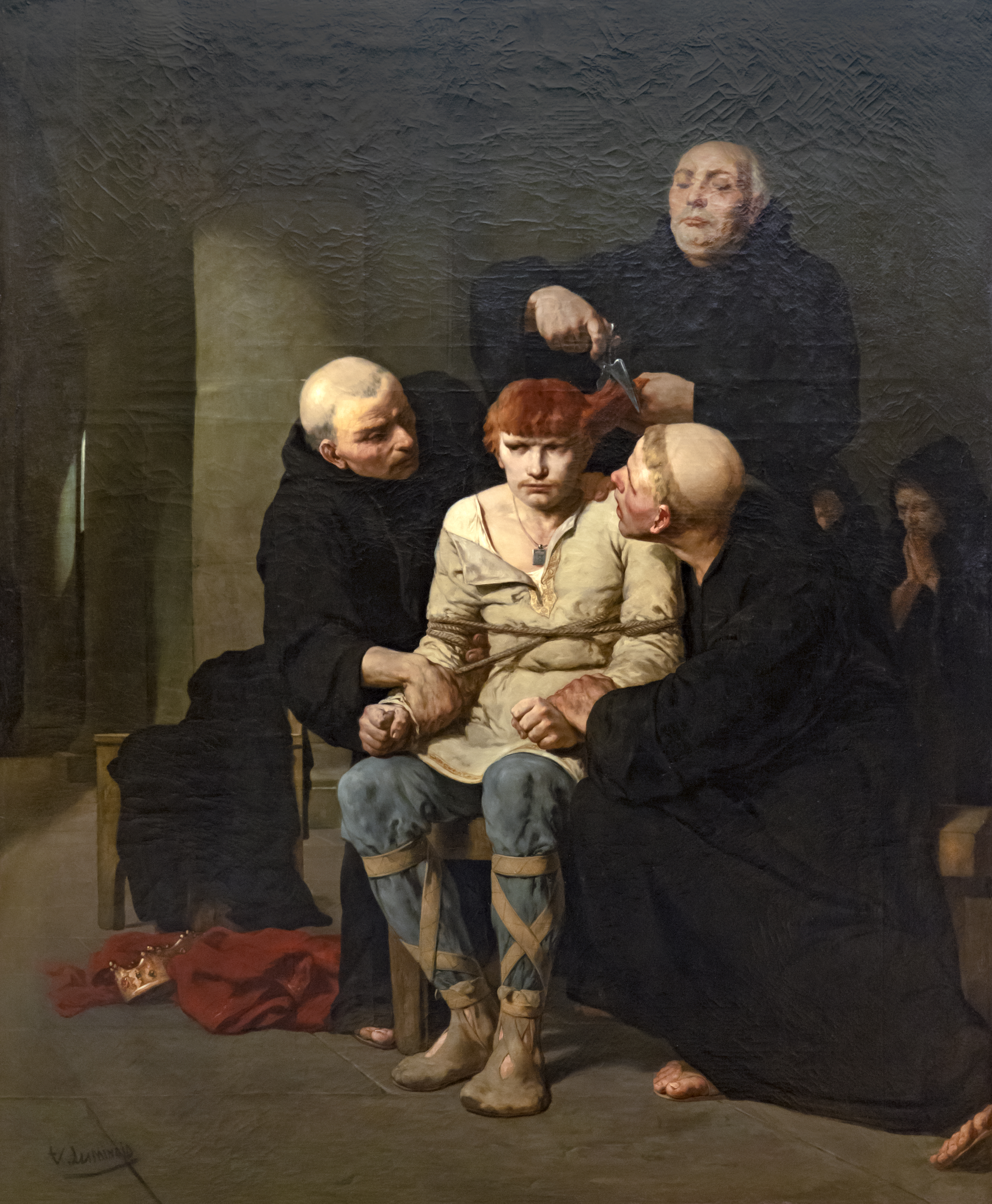
King Childeric III is exiled by Charles Martel

Year 737 (DCCXXXVII) was a common year starting on Tuesday of the Julian calendar. The denomination 737 for this year has been used since the early medieval period, when the Anno Domini calendar era became the prevalent method in Europe for naming.

== Events ==
=== By place ===
==== Europe ====
- Battle of Avignon: Frankish forces under Charles Martel, Merovingian Mayor of the Palace, retake Avignon from the Muslim forces, and destroy the Umayyad stronghold. Charles sends his brother Childebrand I, duke of Burgundy, to besiege the city. After his arrival, Charles leads the Frankish troops by using rope ladders and battering rams to attack the fortified walls, which are burned to the ground following its capture.
- Battle of Narbonne: Frankish forces under Charles Martel besiege Narbonne, occupied by a Umayyad garrison, but are unable to retake the fortress city. A Lombard army under King Liutprand crosses the Alps, to aid Charles in expelling the Muslims from Septimania. Meanwhile Maurontus, duke or count of Provence, raises a revolt from his unconquered city of Marseille, and threatens the rear of the Franks.
- Battle of the River Berre: Frankish forces sent by Charles Martel intercept a large Muslim army sent from Al-Andalus, (modern Spain) sent by Uqba ibn al-Hajjaj to relieve the siege of Narbonne. Both sides suffer heavy losses at the battlefield near the mouth of the River Berre (a short distance south of Narbonne). Some of the Muslims rush back to their ships, and some penetrate through the Frankish forces and make it to the city, effectively saving it from the Franks.
- Following the death of Theuderic IV, king of the Franks, the throne is left vacant for seven years. Charles Martel has his son Childeric III exiled to a monastery, and becomes sole ruler of the Frankish Kingdom.
- King Pelagius of Asturias dies, and is succeeded by his son Favila. He founds the Church of Santa Cruz, in his capital Cangas de Onís (northwestern Spain).
- Orso Ipato is murdered at the instigation of Eutychius, exarch of Ravenna. He is succeeded by Domenico Leoni, who is elected magister militum of Venice.
- King Ongendus of the Danes reinforces the Danevirke fortifications in Schleswig-Holstein. He orders a palisade rampart built on the frontier of Saxony.

==== Britain ====
- King Ceolwulf of Northumbria abdicates in favour of his cousin, Eadberht, and becomes a monk at Lindisfarne Priory.

==== Africa ====
- Egypt: Christians invade from the south, with the aim of protecting the patriarch of Alexandria (approximate date).

==== Asia ====
- Second Arab–Khazar War: The Khazars led by Hazer Tarkhan are defeated by a Muslim force, sent by Marwan ibn Muhammad ibn Marwan near the Volga River, which destroy what remains of the Khazar forces. The Umayyad Caliphate now has full control of the Caucasus after completely destroying the Khazar Empire. After its destruction the Arab-Khazar wars are stopped, Muslim sources indicate the Khazar Khan paid tribute to Marwan and converted to Islam.
- September 30 – Battle of the Baggage: The Turgesh drive back an Umayyad invasion of Khuttal, pursue them south of the River Oxus (northern Afghanistan), and capture their baggage train. In the winter, the Turgesh and their Transoxianan allies launch a major counter-invasion but are halted and their army is destroyed. Khuttal is then conquered by the Arabs.
- Emperor Xuan Zong discards the policy of conscripting men into the Chinese army to be replaced every three years, replacing them with long-service soldiers who are more battle-hardened and efficient (approximate date).

=== By topic ===
==== Catastrophe ====
- A major Japanese smallpox epidemic that started in 735 finally runs its course, but only after causing an estimated 25% to 35% mortality among the adult population in the country.

== Births ==
- Fujiwara no Tanetsugu, Japanese nobleman (d. 785)
- Hisham ibn al-Kalbi, Muslim historian (d. 819)
- Huaisu, Chinese Buddhist monk (d. 799)
- Kanmu, emperor of Japan (d. 806)

== Deaths ==
- Ermin of Lobbes, Frankish abbot
- Forthhere, Anglo-Saxon bishop (approximate date)
- Fujiwara no Fusasaki, Japanese counselor (b. 681)
- Fujiwara no Maro, Japanese politician (b. 695)
- Fujiwara no Muchimaro, Japanese minister (b. 680)
- Fujiwara no Umakai, Japanese statesman (b. 694)
- Mu, king of Balhae (Korea)
- Mu'awiya ibn Hisham, Muslim general
- Orso Ipato, doge of Venice
- Pelagius, king of Asturias (Spain) (b. 685)
- Song Jing, Chancellor of the Tang dynasty (b. 663)
- Theuderic IV, king of the Franks
