= 738 =

Calendar year

738 in various calendars
Gregorian calendar	738; DCCXXXVIII
Ab urbe condita	1491
Armenian calendar	187; ԹՎ ՃՁԷ
Assyrian calendar	5488
Balinese saka calendar	659–660
Bengali calendar	144–145
Berber calendar	1688
Buddhist calendar	1282
Burmese calendar	100
Byzantine calendar	6246–6247
Chinese calendar	丁丑年 (Fire Ox); 3435 or 3228 — to — 戊寅年 (Earth Tiger); 3436 or 3229
Coptic calendar	454–455
Discordian calendar	1904
Ethiopian calendar	730–731
Hebrew calendar	4498–4499
- Hindu calendars
Vikram Samvat	794–795
Shaka Samvat	659–660
Kali Yuga	3838–3839
Holocene calendar	10738
Iranian calendar	116–117
Islamic calendar	120–121
Japanese calendar	Tenpyō 10 (天平１０年)
Javanese calendar	631–632
Julian calendar	738; DCCXXXVIII
Korean calendar	3071
Minguo calendar	1174 before ROC 民前1174年
Nanakshahi calendar	−730
Seleucid era	1049/1050 AG
Thai solar calendar	1280–1281
Tibetan calendar	མེ་མོ་གླང་ལོ་ (female Fire-Ox); 864 or 483 or −289 — to — ས་ཕོ་སྟག་ལོ་ (male Earth-Tiger); 865 or 484 or −288

Map of Maya area, with location of Copán

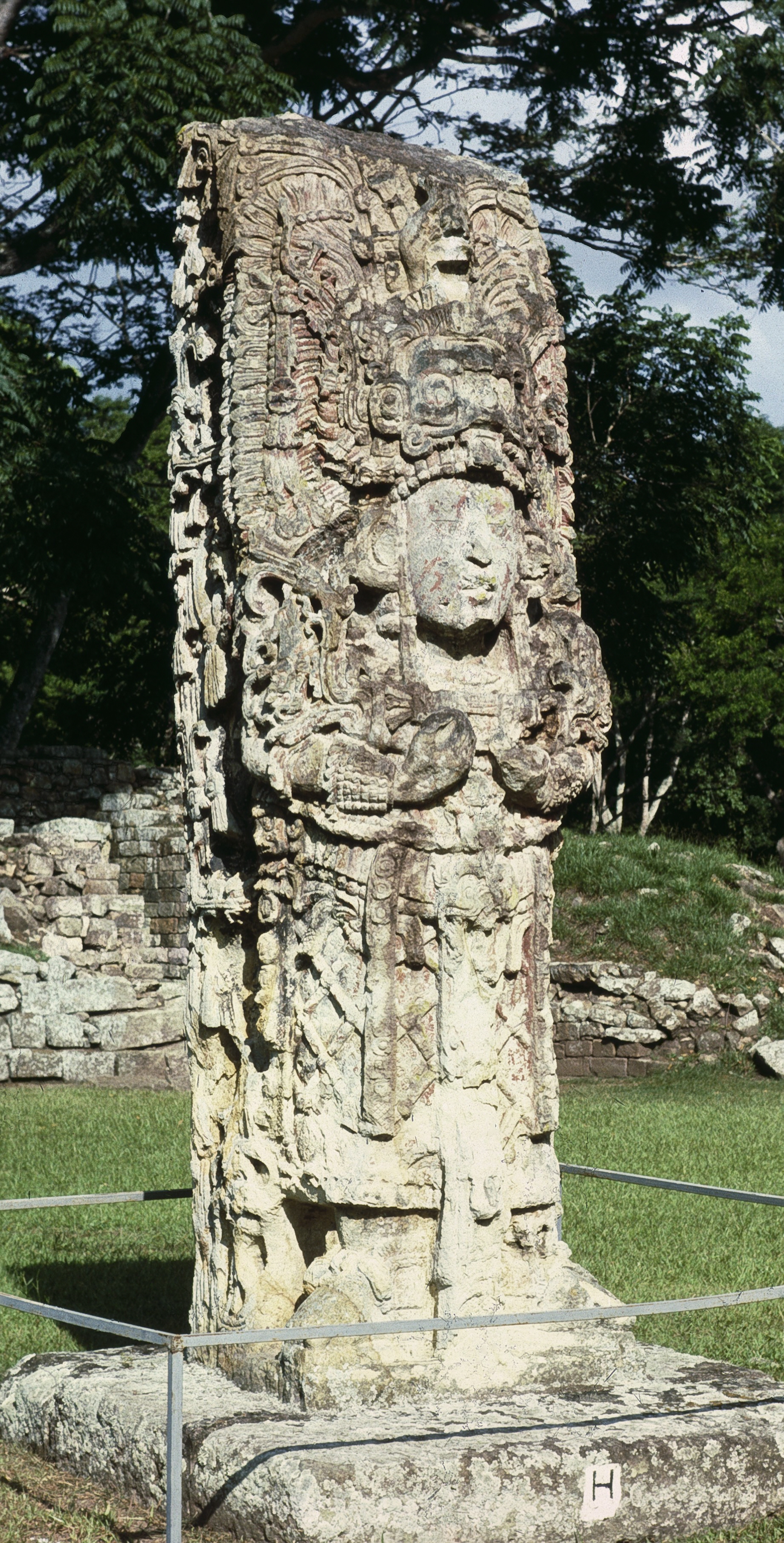
Stela of Uaxaclajuun Ub'aah K'awiil

Year 738 (DCCXXXVIII) was a common year starting on Wednesday of the Julian calendar, the 738th year of the Common Era (CE) and Anno Domini (AD) designations, the 738th year of the 1st millennium, the 38th year of the 8th century, and the 9th year of the 730s decade. The denomination 738 for this year has been used since the early medieval period, when the Anno Domini calendar era became the prevalent method in Europe for naming years.

== Events ==
=== By place ===
==== Europe ====
- Charles Martel, Merovingian mayor of the palace, begins a campaign against the Saxons (in modern-day Westphalia) on the northeast frontier. They are subdued and must pay him tribute.
- Moors under Uqba ibn Al-Hajjaj cross the Pyrenees into France. Uqba fortifies Narbonne and reconquers Avignon, Arles, Nimes. He then advances into Provence, and penetrates as far as Piedmont; he then heads North, and conquers Dauphiné, destroying the city of Saint-Paul, taking Valence, Vienne and Lyon, which he uses as a base to attack Bourgogne.
- Kormesiy, ruler (khagan) of the Bulgarian Empire, is deposed by the nobility. He is replaced on the throne by his son Sevar, who is a descendant of the royal Dulo clan.
- Felice Cornicola is appointed hypatos (Byzantine consul) and magister militum of Venice.

==== Britain ====
- King Swæfberht of Essex dies after a 23-year reign. He is succeeded by Saelred, a minor member of the Essex royal family.

==== Mesoamerica ====
- The Mayan city-state Xukpi (Copán) is defeated by a rival city-state, Quiriguá. Xukpi leader Uaxaclajuun Ub'aah K'awiil ("Eighteen Rabbit") is deposed thereafter.

=== By topic ===
==== Religion ====
- Boniface visits Rome, and is made papal legate of the Frankish Kingdom. He establishes many bishoprics in Bavaria.

== Births ==
- Chengguan, Chinese Buddhist monk (d. 839)

== Deaths ==
- January 26 – John of Dailam, Syrian monk (b. 660)
- May 3 – Uaxaclajuun Ub'aah K'awiil, Mayan ruler (ajaw)
- Áed mac Colggen, king of the Uí Cheinnselaig (Ireland)
- Asad ibn Abdallah al-Qasri, Arab governor
- Dluthach mac Fithcheallach, king of Uí Maine (Ireland)
- Fáelán mac Murchado, king of Leinster
- Maslama ibn Abd al-Malik, Arab general
- Suluk, Turkic ruler (khagan) of the Turgesh
- Swæfberht, king of Essex

== In fiction ==
- In the fiction of H. P. Lovecraft, Abd Al Azred, Muslim-kafir scholar and scientist, is killed in Damascus city market. His treatise on religion, the Al-Azif, is published soon thereafter.
