= 731 =

Calendar year

731 in various calendars
- Gregorian calendar: 731; DCCXXXI
- Ab urbe condita: 1484
- Armenian calendar: 180; ԹՎ ՃՁ
- Assyrian calendar: 5481
- Balinese saka calendar: 652–653
- Bengali calendar: 137–138
- Berber calendar: 1681
- Buddhist calendar: 1275
- Burmese calendar: 93
- Byzantine calendar: 6239–6240
- Chinese calendar: 庚午年 (Metal Horse); 3428 or 3221 — to — 辛未年 (Metal Goat); 3429 or 3222
- Coptic calendar: 447–448
- Discordian calendar: 1897
- Ethiopian calendar: 723–724
- Hebrew calendar: 4491–4492
- Hindu calendars
- Vikram Samvat: 787–788
- Shaka Samvat: 652–653
- Kali Yuga: 3831–3832
- Holocene calendar: 10731
- Iranian calendar: 109–110
- Islamic calendar: 112–113
- Japanese calendar: Tenpyō 3 (天平３年)
- Javanese calendar: 624–625
- Julian calendar: 731; DCCXXXI
- Korean calendar: 3064
- Minguo calendar: 1181 before ROC 民前1181年
- Nanakshahi calendar: −737
- Seleucid era: 1042/1043 AG
- Thai solar calendar: 1273–1274
- Tibetan calendar: ལྕགས་ཕོ་རྟ་ལོ་ (male Iron-Horse); 857 or 476 or −296 — to — ལྕགས་མོ་ལུག་ལོ་ (female Iron-Sheep); 858 or 477 or −295

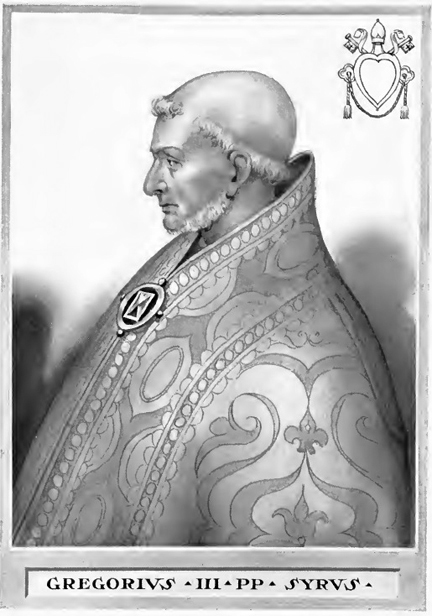
Pope Gregory III (731–741)

Year 731 (DCCXXXI) was a common year starting on Monday of the Julian calendar. The denomination 731 for this year has been used since the early medieval period, when the Anno Domini calendar era became the prevalent method in Europe for naming years.

== Events ==
=== By place ===
==== Europe ====
- Umayyad conquest of Gaul: Munuza, Moorish governor of Cerdagne (eastern Pyrenees), rebels against Umayyad authority. He is defeated and executed by Muslim forces under Abdul Rahman Al Ghafiqi at Urgell (Catalonia). Muslim garrisons in Septimania raid the cities Millau and Arles.
- Ragenfrid, ex-mayor of the palace of Neustria, meets Duke Eudes of Aquitaine, to accept his rule and independence from the Frankish Kingdom. Fearing an alliance against him, Charles Martel exiles Ragenfrid's supporter Wandon of Fontenelle, and imprisons bishop Aimar of Auxerre.
- Charles Martel leads two raids across the Loire River into the Berry region. The Franks seize and plunder Bourges (central France), but the city is immediately recaptured by Eudes of Aquitaine.

==== Britain ====
- Autumn – King Ceolwulf of Northumbria is deposed by opponents, and forced to enter a monastery. His supporters subsequently restore him to the throne (or 732).
- King Æthelbald of Mercia overruns a large portion of Somerset, and wrests the county from Wessex control (approximate date).

==== Asia ====
- Battle of the Defile: An Umayyad relief army (28,000 men) is sent to Samarkand (modern Uzbekistan), which is besieged by the Turgesh. The Muslims are ambushed near the Zarafshan Range, at the Tashtakaracha Pass. The battle results in a Pyrrhic victory, with heavy casualties for the Umayyad army, halting Muslim expansion in Central Asia for almost two decades.

=== By topic ===
==== Literature ====
- Bede, Anglo-Saxon monk and historian, completes his Historia ecclesiastica gentis Anglorum at the monastery of Saint Peter at Monkwearmouth.

==== Religion ====
- February 11 – Pope Gregory II dies at Rome after a 16-year reign, in which he has fought Iconoclasm. He is succeeded by the Syrian-born cleric Gregory III, as the 90th pope of the Catholic Church.
- June 10 – The Mercian Tatwine is consecrated as Archbishop of Canterbury.
- November 1 – Synod of Rome: Gregory III summons a council at the shrine of Saint Peter. All western bishops participate, including the Roman nobility. Gregory condemns Iconoclasm as a heresy.
- 731 or 732 (traditional date) – Sack of Luxeuil (no evidence for event).

== Births ==
- Abd al-Rahman I, Muslim emir of Córdoba (d. 788)
- Ōtomo no Otomaro, Japanese general and Shōgun (d. 809)
- Telets, ruler (khagan) of the Bulgarian Empire (approximate date)

== Deaths ==
- February 9 – Zhang Yue, chancellor of the Tang Dynasty (b. 667)
- February 11 – Gregory II, pope of the Catholic Church (b. 669)
- August 31 – Ōtomo no Tabito, Japanese poet (b. 665)
- December 22 – Yuan Qianyao, official of the Chinese Tang dynasty
- date unknown
  - Barjik, prince of the Khazar Khaganate
  - Berhtwald, archbishop of Canterbury
  - Munuza, Moorish governor of Cerdagne
  - Ragenfrid, mayor of the palace of Neustria
  - Yuwen Rong, chancellor of the Tang dynasty (or 730)
