= 732 =

Calendar year

732 in various calendars
Gregorian calendar	732; DCCXXXII
Ab urbe condita	1485
Armenian calendar	181; ԹՎ ՃՁԱ
Assyrian calendar	5482
Balinese saka calendar	653–654
Bengali calendar	138–139
Berber calendar	1682
Buddhist calendar	1276
Burmese calendar	94
Byzantine calendar	6240–6241
Chinese calendar	辛未年 (Metal Goat); 3429 or 3222 — to — 壬申年 (Water Monkey); 3430 or 3223
Coptic calendar	448–449
Discordian calendar	1898
Ethiopian calendar	724–725
Hebrew calendar	4492–4493
- Hindu calendars
Vikram Samvat	788–789
Shaka Samvat	653–654
Kali Yuga	3832–3833
Holocene calendar	10732
Iranian calendar	110–111
Islamic calendar	113–114
Japanese calendar	Tenpyō 4 (天平４年)
Javanese calendar	625–626
Julian calendar	732; DCCXXXII
Korean calendar	3065
Minguo calendar	1180 before ROC 民前1180年
Nanakshahi calendar	−736
Seleucid era	1043/1044 AG
Thai solar calendar	1274–1275
Tibetan calendar	ལྕགས་མོ་ལུག་ལོ་ (female Iron-Sheep); 858 or 477 or −295 — to — ཆུ་ཕོ་སྤྲེ་ལོ་ (male Water-Monkey); 859 or 478 or −294

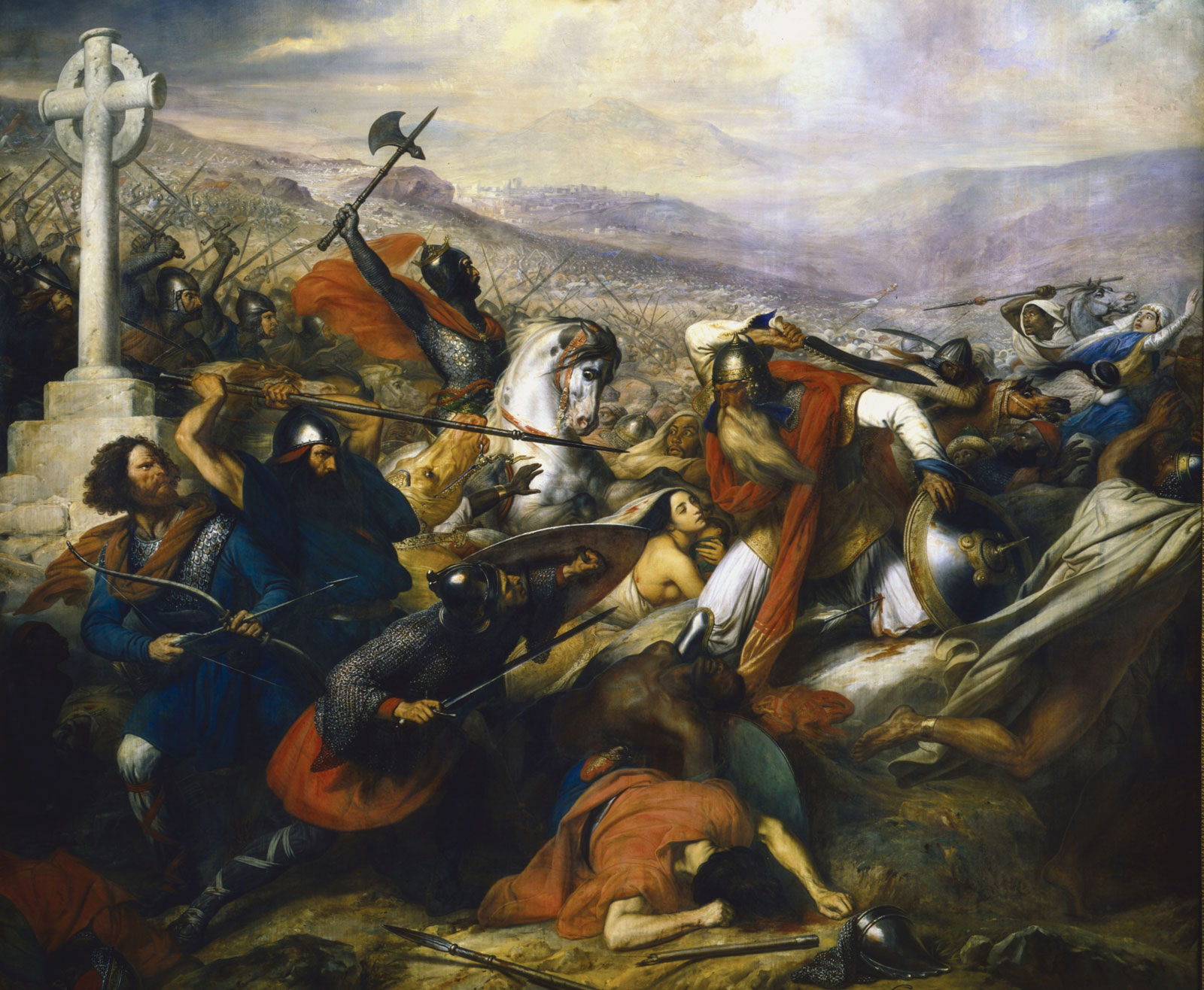
Charles Martel (mounted) defeats Abdul Rahman Al Ghafiqi at the Battle of Tours

Year 732 (DCCXXXII) was a leap year starting on Tuesday of the Julian calendar, the 732nd year of the Common Era (CE) and Anno Domini (AD) designations, the 732nd year of the 1st millennium, the 32nd year of the 8th century, and the 3rd year of the 730s decade. The denomination 732 for this year has been used since the early medieval period, when the Anno Domini calendar era became the prevalent method in Europe for naming years.

== Events ==
=== By place ===
==== Byzantine Empire ====
- Byzantine Emperor Leo III marries his 15 year old son Constantine to Tzitzak (later baptised as Irene), the daughter of the Khazar Khagan Bihar, as a sign of diplomatic unity between the Byzantine Empire and the Khazar Khaganate.

==== Europe ====
- Battle of the River Garonne: A Umayyad Muslim army (40,000 men) under Abdul Rahman Al Ghafiqi, governor of Al-Andalus, crosses the Pyrenees through the Roncesvalles Pass and raids widely, ravaging the cities of Oloron, Lescar and Bayonne, and burning the abbey of Saint-Sever. Umayyad forces destroy the monastery of Saint-Émilion, and defeat the 'Count of Libourne'. Abdul Rahman sacks and captures Bordeaux, and nearly wipes out the army of Duke Eudes of Aquitaine, at the Garonne River.
- Summer – Eudes of Aquitaine heads for the Frankish city of Reims, to warn Charles Martel, Merovingian mayor of the palace, of the Umayyad invasion in Gaul, and ask for his support against the invaders. The two leaders meet near Paris; Charles issues a 'general ban' to raise an army, which includes large numbers of Austrasians, Neustrians, and Burgundians. Meanwhile, Arabians ravage the cities of Périgueux, Saintes, and Angoulême, then sack the basilica of Saint-Hilaire outside Poitiers.
- September – Charles Martel leads his Frankish army (30,000 men) to Orléans and crosses the Loire River, probably accompanied by Eudes of Aquitaine, with his remaining troops. He makes camp near Tours, probably at Ballan-Miré south-west of the fortress city, in order to protect the abbey of Saint Martin. Charles defeats or forces back Umayyad scouts or an advance guard, between the rivers Indre and Creuse. Abdul Rahman Al Ghafiqi pulls back to establish a position at the Vienne River.
- October – The Frankish army crosses the Vienne River and establishes a camp at or around the partially abandoned Roman mansion or agricultural settlement, now known as 'Vieux-Poitiers' (near Châtellerault), perhaps using the Roman theatre with its substantial towers as a fortification. Charles Martel forms a defensive position across the Roman road, and fends off Muslim skirmishes during the 'seven days' stand-off, probably involving scouts, and perhaps raiders from both armies.
- October 10 – Battle of Tours: The Frankish and Burgundian forces under Charles Martel defeat a large army of Abdul Rahman Al Ghafiqi, near Poitiers, halting the Islamic advance into Western Europe; Rahman Al Ghafiqi is killed during the battle. Charles extends his authority in the south of France, which gives him the nickname Martellus ("The Hammer"). The outcome of the victory is a turning point, and establishes a balance of power between Western Europe and the Byzantine Empire.
- Muslim forces withdraw southwards to Septimania; a separate part probably pulls back along the road it originally came through, across the Pyrenees Mountains. Eudes of Aquitaine pursues the main Muslim army via La Marche, before returning to Bordeaux; Charles Martel withdraws to Frankish territory through Orléans and Auxerre, demoting those bishops whom he thought unreliable. Abd al-Malik ibn Katan al-Fihri becomes the new governor (wali) of Al-Andalus; a separate Muslim force raids the Rhône region.

==== Britain ====
- Autumn – King Ceolwulf of Northumbria is deposed by opponents, and forced to enter a monastery. His supporters subsequently restore him to the throne (or 731).

=== By topic ===
==== Astronomy ====
- June 26 – Venus occults Jupiter.

==== Religion ====
- Pope Gregory III confers on Boniface, Anglo-Saxon missionary, the pallium as archbishop, with jurisdiction over Bavaria (modern Germany). He orders him to forbid the consumption of horseflesh by his Christian converts.
- Ecgbert is appointed bishop of York, by his cousin Ceolwulf of Northumbria. He founds a library, and makes the city a renowned centre of learning (approximate date).

== Births ==
- Fujiwara no Momokawa, Japanese statesman (d. 779)

== Deaths ==
- March 13 – Gerald of Mayo, Anglo-Saxon abbot
- Abdul Rahman Al Ghafiqi, governor of Al-Andalus
- Nechtan mac Der-Ilei, king of the Picts
- Romuald II, duke of Benevento (Italy)
- Rupert of Bingen, patron saint (b. 712)
- Sima Zhen, Chinese historian (b. 679)
