= Synod of Rome =

Synod of Rome or Council of Rome may refer to a number of synods or councils of the Catholic Church, held in Rome, including:

- Synod of Rome (313), attended by the bishop of Beneventum, and Reticius, bishop of Autun
- Council of Rome (382), a meeting of Christian Church officials and theologians under the authority of Pope Damasus I
- Synod of Rome (721), a synod held in St. Peter's Basilica under the authority of Pope Gregory II
- Synods of Rome (731), two synods held in St. Peter's Basilica under the authority of Pope Gregory III
- Synod of Rome (732), a synod held in Rome under the authority of Pope Gregory III
- Synod of Rome (898): multiple councils held by Pope John IX to rectify the wrongs of the Cadaver Synod
- Synod of Rome (963), a possibly uncanonical synod held in St. Peter's Basilica under the authority of the Holy Roman Emperor to depose Pope John XII
- Synod of Rome (964), a synod held in St. Peter's Basilica, for the purpose of condemning the Synod of Rome (963) and to depose Pope Leo VIII
- Council of Rome (1099), held by Urban II
