= Siege of Avignon =

Siege of Avignon may refer to:

- Siege of Avignon (500), during Clovis I's war with the Burgundians
- Siege of Avignon (567), during a Frankish civil war
- Siege of Avignon (583), during the revolt of Gundoald
- Siege of Avignon (737), during the Umayyad invasion of Gaul
- Siege of Avignon (1226), during the Albigensians Crusades
