= Battle of Bajarwan =

730 battle of the Second Arab–Khazar War

- Part of the Second Arab–Khazar War
Date	Late December 730
Location	Bəcirəvan, Jalilabad, Azerbaijan
Result	Umayyad victory
Territorial changes	Khazar conquests in Azerbaijan and Arran abandoned

Belligerents
Khazar Khaganate	Umayyad Caliphate

Commanders and leaders
Barjik	Sa'id ibn Amr al-Harashi

Strength
10,000	4,000 men

Casualties and losses
Majority killed	Unknown

The Battle of Bajarwan took place during the Second Arab–Khazar War, between the armies of the Khazar Khaganate, led by Khagan Barjik, and the Umayyad Caliphate, whose commanding general was Sa'id ibn Amr al-Harashi.

== Background ==
After the crushing defeat of the Umayyads by the Khazars in the battle of Marj Ardabil, the Umayyad Caliph appointed Sa'id ibn Amr al-Harashi to deal with the Khazar threat. Sa'id was given a force of 30,000 men and 100,000 dirhams for the campaign's expenses. Entering Armenia, he recaptured Ahlat and Barda from the Khazars. He possibly drove them from Zarean. Sai'd turned south to Beylagan, where he managed to lift the siege of Warathan by the Khazars. He also managed to defeat a group of Khazars from a nearby village and rescue local girls captured.

After the withdrawal from Warathan, the Khazars attempted to besiege Bajarwan, but Sai'd quickly lifted the siege and forced them to retreat. At Bajarwan, he was informed that Khagan Barjik was encamping 24 kilometers from there. With a force of 10,000 men and 5,000 Muslim households captured.

== Battle ==
Deciding to confirm this, he dispatched his officer, Ibrahim ibn-Asim al-Uqayli. Ibrahim was fluent in the Khazarian language. He managed to enter the camp disguised. Meanwhile, Sa'id was preparing to attack the Khazars with a force of 4,000 men. Ibrahim returned and confirmed the news to Sai'd. They reached the Khazar's position before morning. Meanwhile, the Umayyads saw the head of the dead general at Marj Ardabil, Al-Jarrah, displayed on the Khagan's command wagon, which made them eager for revenge. The Khazars were unalarmed by the nearby enemy. The Umayyads charged at them with the shouts of Takbir. The Khazars were unprepared as they suddenly woke up from the sounds. By the morning arrival, the majority of the Khazars were massacred, and the prisoners were rescued. The Khagan managed to escape from the battle.

== Aftermath ==
Despite the victories of Sa'id, he was not given the governorship of Armenia and Azerbaijan. Instead, Maslama ibn Abd al-Malik was appointed in early January of 731. He had Sa'id imprisoned at Qabala, berating him for not waiting for him and recklessly endangering the Muslim army. The Caliph ordered Sa'id to be released in the end.

== Sources ==
- Dunlop, D. M (1954), The history of the Jewish Khazars.
- Ian Heath (2015), Armies of the Dark Ages.
- Khalid Yahya Blankinship (1994), The End of the Jihâd State, The Reign of Hishām Ibn ʻAbd Al-Malik and the Collapse of the Umayyads.
