= Frodoald =

Frodoald (died in 814) was the Count of Vannes from 799 to around 814.

== Origin ==
Frodoald, or Hrodolt, is a variant of the root "hrot" found in Hrotharius, which corresponds to the name Lothaire. He belonged to the Widonids family, also known as the Guy, Garnier, and Lambert family, which originated from Austrasia and had been established in this region for several generations. His name appears alongside those of his brothers, Gu and Garnier, in a 782 Charter of Charlemagne concerning the monastery of Hornbach. Frodoald was the younger son of Lambert and Teutberge, and the brother of Guy, Count of Nantes and Marquis of the March of Brittrany.

This family, notable during the early Carolingian period, was involved in the political and territorial developments of the time, particularly in the regions that today correspond to parts of France and Germany. The Widonids played an influential role in both local governance and the broader Frankish Empire under Charlemagne.

== Count of Vannes ==
Frodoald became Count of Vannes before 799 when he was subordinated in this role to his brother, the Marquis Guy of Nantes. It was in this context that he had to participate in the same year, alongside his brother, in an expedition to Brittany led by the "marquis and his lieutenants, the counts.".

It seems that Frodoald exercised his authority mainly in the Romanized area of the county, where he administered justice through his two missi comitis (viscounts), Gautro and Hermandro, who presided over the judgment of a certain Anau, a resident of the town of Langon, on September 29, 803..

Although it is not specified, Frodoald likely also participated in the 811 expedition sent by Charlemagne "against the Bretons to punish their treachery".

Frodoald likely died around 814, the year when his position was taken over by his son, Gui II de Vannes.
