= Sigeric I of Essex =

King of Essex

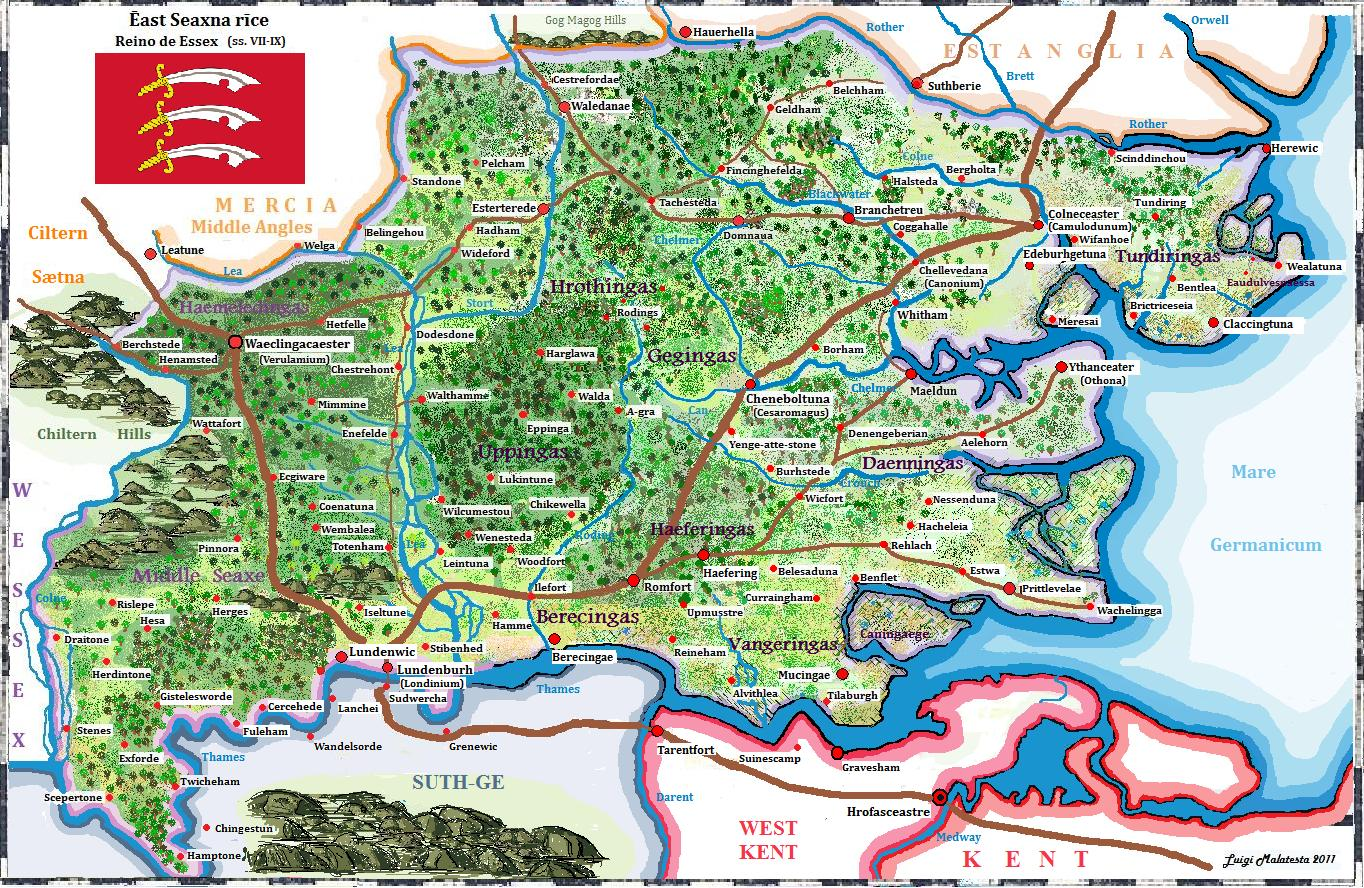
Map of the Kingdom of Essex, Heptarchy period.

Sigeric I of Essex was a King of Essex, and a son of Saelred of Essex, reigning from an unknown date until he abdicated and went on pilgrimage to Rome in 798. Like his predecessors, he recognised Mercian overlordship.

The Itinerary of Archbishop Sigeric, a record of the journey of Sigeric, Archbishop of Canterbury, to Rome in 990. It includes a list of 23 churches in Rome that he visited, one of which was dedicated to St Sigeric, possibly the same as the king of Essex

Preceded by Swithred of Essex	King of Essex c. 758 – 798	Succeeded by Sigered of Essex
