= Council of Rome (1099) =

The Easter Council was a church council held at Rome by Pope Urban II on Easter Day, 1099.

St Anselm, then in exile from his see at Canterbury, was in attendance at the request of the Pope.

Among other acts, it strengthened the Catholic Church's opposition to lay investiture and the paying of homage by bishops.

== See also ==
- Council of Rome (AD 382)
