= Swithred of Essex =

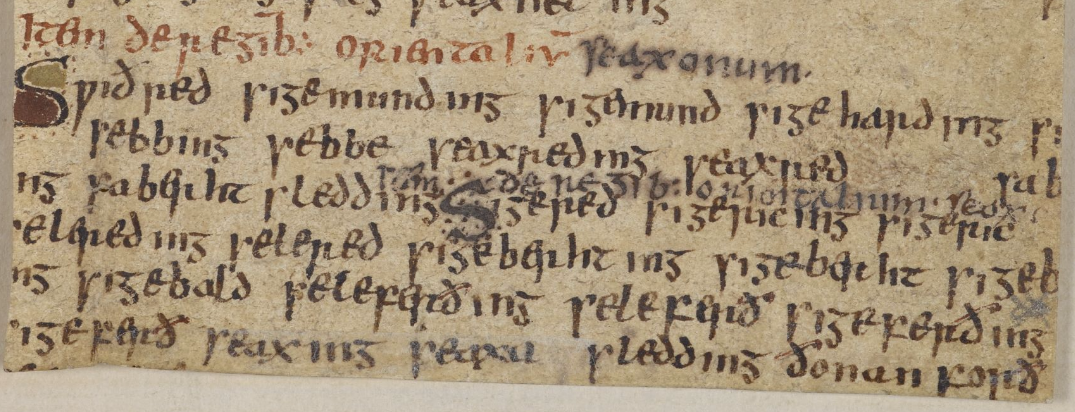
The ancestry of Swithred in MS BL Add. 23211.

Swithred of Essex (also known as Swaefred) was King of Essex (746–758). He was the second son of Sebbi, and the grandson of King Sigeheard of Essex. Like his predecessors, he was not an independent ruler, but a dependent of the Kingdom of Mercia.

There is also reported a Swithred who may have been the archbishop Feologild, fl.832.

Preceded by Saelred of Essex	King of Essex c. 746 – 758	Succeeded by Sigeric of Essex
