= Barjik =

Khagan of Khazaria

- Qaghan of Khazaria
- Reign: 715 AD – 731/732 AD
- Predecessor: Busir
- Successor: Bihar
- Born: 7th century
- Died: 731 AD or early 732 AD
- Spouse: Parsbit
- Issue: Bihar
- Dynasty: Ashina

Barjik (died 731/732) was a Khazar Khagan who flourished in the early to mid 8th century, he was the commander of Khazar armies during Arab–Khazar wars. His notoriety earned him the nicknames The Accursed Khagan and Ouios Khaganou (Old Turkic. Qağan Oglu, tr. Son of the Khagan) by his enemies.

== Name and meaning ==
While Barjik is the name accepted by modern historians, his name seems to differ in sources. The first part of his name is accepted as same in different sources, but the second part of his name varies in many sources.

1. Balami's Tarixi Tabari;

a. Bārx.k (Bodleian E., Oxford)

b. Bārhik, Bārjik (Bodleian F., Oxford)

c. Barx. k, Bārx.k; ?arh.l, Bārh.l; ?arh.l; ?arx.l, Bārxil, Bāžxīl, Bārhil; ?arh.k, Bazj.nk, Barj.nk; Bārxīk, Bar.nk, Barh. k (Paris, Bibliothèque Nationale)

2. Barjik, Barh.k, Barhil, Barh b.k (Barsbek?), Barhik (Dorn B., Nachrichten ueber die chasaren, Memories de l'acad)

3. Barsbik, Barsnik, Barstik (Ibn Atham Al Kufi)

4. Narjili Xağan Oğli (Narjili, son of the Khagan), Barjank (Tabari)

5. Pasenk, Pasih (Derbendname)

The great variety of forms found in these sources do not lend themselves easy analysis. It would appear that the Bal'ami and Ibn A'tham al-Kufirm's go back to a common source (with the Turkish translation of Tabari being based on Bal'ami). The first three letters bar are faithfully preserved all our forms; it is in the latter three/four that the name's many difficulties arise. The sense or confusion in pointing makes the name's analysis even more difficult. The al'ami manuscripts' forms apparently go back to an original the pointing which for the last three letters is unclear. The Ibn A'tham al-Kufi's source text is not clearly all visible, causing a confusion in the translation of the work,

1. بارستيك (Barsnik)
2. بارسنيك (Barsbik)
3. بارسبيك (Barstik)

are the most likely meanings of the texts in the source.

Meaning of his name is mostly difficult to explain due to different sources but Peter Golden pointed out to similarities of Barjik with the word from Kashgari's work 'Barcing/Barcin'. Kasghari in his work described this as a type of 'Silken material' . The word exists in the Mamluk Qipchak as well as Chuvash with the same meanings. It is also borrowed by Hungarian as 'Barsony' meaning 'Velvet'. Golden suggested that 'Barjik' is a personal name and fits in the category of 'Names Based on Precious Materials' like Altun (Gold) or Kümüs (Silver).

== Identification with Queen Parsbit ==
A. N. Kurat has mentioned that the Ibn A'tham al-Küfi forms are garblings translating into Barsbek. The name Barsbek is an old Turkic male name and a male given title meaning Leopard-Lord. However this name was also given to another Khazar figure of the same period, Parsbit. However Parsbit is woman, and regarded as 'Mayr (mother) of the Qaghan.'

However Czegledy suggest that this text in Łewond's text is misread and should be read as 'Hayr (father) of the Qaghan'. The Qaghan in question is future Qaghan Bihar (Khazar). Bihar is accepted as Barjik's son and successor. This leads us to conclusion that Parsbit is the mother of Bihar and Barjik as the father of Bihar. However Czegledy's suggestion cause problems, as well as the name Parsbit and Barjik's association with the name 'Barsbek', leading to the idea of Parsbit and Barjik being the same person.

The sources mention that Barjik was the commander of 'Campaign of 730' with his brother Khagan Oglu, Tarmach, and a certain Tarkhan. The sources also mention Parsbit giving orders. However since Barjik is the Khagan and the commander of all forces at the time, Parsbit in this situation has no authority to order.

With current the situation, no conclusion can be reached, with the biggest and the most likely possibilities being Parsbit is either Barjik's wife or himself.

== Role ==
Aside from his birth name Barjik was frequently called with many nicknames. He already achieved many victories against Muslim Armies while still a prince, thus becoming known as 'Son of the Khagan' (Xağan Oğlu) in the Islamic World, albeit negatively. Modern historians have accepted the fact that Barjik was still known as Son of the Khagan even after becoming Khagan thus causing a misconception and confusion for al-Tabari. According to historians Barjik was crowned as the khagan after the first attack on Balanjar that occurred around 711-715 when Busir was stopped being mentioned by Greeks sources. Dunlop, Golden and Blainkinship as well as earlier Arabic historians such as Balami and Ibn Qutaybah mentioned that Barjik was the Khagan leading the battles against the Arab armies thorughout the war. They also pointed that Khagan mentioned by Lewond, that the a major Arab raiding party reached Al-Bayda and fatally wounded the Khagan (Battle of Al-Bayda). Barjik, who is the Khagan at the time, did not die and survived the ambush.

His other nicknames were The Enemy of Allah and the Accursed Khagan given by Arabs due to his notoriety.

== Reign ==
Barjik first appears in 713/714 as part of the Khazar army in Arab sources, in which Maslama led an expedition which captured Derbent after a short siege, reportedly after a resident showed him a secret underground passage. The Armenian historian Łewond claims that the Arabs, realizing that they could not hold the fortress, destroyed its walls. Maslama then drove deeper into Khazar territory.

Barjik khagan regathered his army confronted the advancing Arabs at the city of Tarku (714) but, apart from a series of single combats by champions, the two armies did not engage for several days. However, the imminent arrival of Khazar reinforcements under the general Alp' defeated Maslama who was forced to quickly abandon his campaign and retreat to Iberia, leaving his camp with all its equipment as a ruse.

In 715, the Khazars led by Barjik invaded and raided Albania with an army claimed to be 80,000 strong soldiers. In 717, Barjik raided Adharbayjan in force. With the main Umayyad army, occupied at Constantinople, Caliph could only spare 4,000 men to confront Barjik. The Arab commander Hatim ibn al-Nu'man managed to defeat and drive back the Khazars.

In 721/22, Barjik invaded Armenia that winter, and decisively defeated the local governor, raiding the area before returning.

Caliph sent al-Jarrah ibn Abdallah, one of his most celebrated generals, north with 25,000 troops in response. The Khazars retreated to the area of Derbent, that was captured by Muslims previously now under siege. Learning that the local Lezgin chief was in contact with the Barjik, al-Jarrah set up camp on the river Rubas and announced that the army would remain there for several days. Instead, he arrived at Derbent in a night march and entered it. From there, al-Jarrah launched raiding columns into Khazar territory ahead of the bulk of his army.

Hearing this, Barjik immediately moved to Alania in 722 together wih his brother Khagan Oglu and a tarkhan named Bulkhan, the joint Alan-Khazar army inflicted a defeat on the Arab general Tabit al-Nahrani. Barjik later marched to river al-Ran to confront al-Jarrah.

Barjik met al-Jarrah's army at the river al-Ran, one day's march north of Derbent, after joining in force with Khagan Oglu. According to al-Tabari the Arab strength was 25,000. The Khazars, commanded by Barjik khagan, reportedly numbered 40,000. The Arabs were victorious, losing 4,000 men to the Khazars' 7,000. Advancing north, the Arab army captured the settlements of Khamzin and Targhu and resettled their inhabitants elsewhere. However the Arab victory is arguable, since their advance did not continue until next year.

Finally, the Arab army reached Balanjar, the capital of Khazars. Barjik defended their capital by surrounding the citadel with a wagon fort of 300 wagons tied together with ropes, a common tactic among nomads. The Arabs, with their morale raised by al-Jarrah, broke through, storming the city on 21 August 722. At that time, so many Khazar prisoners were taken that al-Jarrah ordered some of them drowned in the Balanjar River..

The Umayyad army under Al-Jarrah intended to advance to Samandar, the next major Khazar settlement, but cut his campaign short when he learned that the Barjik was gathering large forces, which forced Al-Jarrah into retreat. The Arabs had not yet defeated the main Khazar army, which (like all nomad forces) did not depend on cities for supplies. The presence of this force near Samandar and reports of rebellions among the mountain tribes in their rear forced the Arabs to retreat to Warthan, south of the Caucasus. On his return, al-Jarrah reported on his campaign to the caliph and requested additional troops to defeat the Khazars. This is an indication of the severity of the fighting and, according to Blankinship, that the campaign was not necessarily the resounding success portrayed in Muslim sources.

Hearing the news of Al-Jarrah coming back and going through Darial Gate, Barjik raided south of the Caucasus in response, but in February 724, Barjik was decisively defeated in a days-long battle near the rivers Cyrus and Araxes. Later, al-Jarrah captured Tiflis and brought Caucasian Iberia and the lands of the Alans under Muslim suzerainty. These campaigns made al-Jarrah the first Muslim commander to cross the Darial Pass, secured the Muslim flank against a possible Khazar attack through the pass, and gave the Arabs a second invasion route into Khazar territory. However the Arab army suffered major losses and Barjik managed to recover Darial Gate which overall meant the failure of the mission.

In 725, the caliph replaced al-Jarrah with his own half-brother Maslama, governor of the Jazira. Maslama's appointment is considered by modern historians to attest to the importance placed by the caliph on the Khazar front, since he was not only a member of the rulingy dynasty, but also one of the most distinguished generals of the Umayyad empire. The following year, Barjik launched a major invasion of Albania and Adharbayjan. The Khazars laid siege to Warthan with mangonels. Al-Harith defeated them on the Araxes and drove them north of the river, but the Arab position was clearly precarious.

Barjik assumed command of the again front in 727. Maslama was faced personally for the first time with the Barjik himself, as both sides escalated the conflict. Maslama took the offensive, probably reinforced with Syrian and Jaziran troops. He recovered the Darial Pass (which had been lost after al-Jarrah's 724 expedition) and pushed into Khazar territory, campaigning there until the onset of winter forced him to return to Adharbayjan.

Maslama's second assault, the following year, was less successful; Blankinship calls it a "near disaster". Arab sources report that the Umayyad troops fought for thirty or forty days in the mud, with continuous rain, before defeating the khagan on 17 September 728.

The impact of their victory is questionable, however, as Barjik ambushed Maslama when he retreated, and the Arabs abandoned their baggage train and fled through the Darial Pass to safety. After this campaign, Maslama was replaced yet again by al-Jarrah. Despite his energy, Maslama's campaigns failed to produce the desired results; by 729, the Arabs had lost control of the northeastern parts of the South Caucasus and were again on the defensive, with al-Jarrah having to defend Adharbayjan against a Khazar invasion.

In 729/30, Barjik led a massive army of allegedly 300,000 men (Note: Łewond reports that the Khazar invasion was preceded by the death of the khagan, leaving his widow Parsbit as ruler over the Khazars. Consequently, Semyonov suggests that al-Jarrah's raid against al-Bayda may indeed have reached al-Bayda, or at least succeeded in killing the khagan, and that the subsequent invasion was launched as a campaign of vengeance.), which forced the Maslama into again retreat south of the Caucasus and defend Albania.

It is unclear whether the Khazar invasion was through the Darial Pass, the Caspian Gates, or both. Arab sources say that the invasion was led by Barjik khagan through the Caspian Gates and Łewond identifies Tar'mach as the Khazar tarkhan who led the army through Darial Pass. Al-Jarrah apparently dispersed some of his forces, withdrawing his main army to Bardha'a and then to Ardabil. Ardabil was the capital of Adharbayjan, and most of the Muslim settlers and their families (about 30,000) lived within its walls. Informed of Arab movements by the prince of Iberia, Barjik moved around al-Jarrah and attacked Warthan.

After a three-day battle, from 7 to 9 December 730, Barjik destroyed al-Jarrah's 25,000-man army Al-Jarrah was among the fallen and his head was severed by Barjik and put on a stick to scare away the Muslims, which reportedly enraged them. Command passed to his brother, al-Hajjaj, who could not prevent the sacking of Ardabil. The 10th-century historian Agapius of Hierapolis reports that the Barjik took as many as 40,000 prisoners from the city, al-Jarrah's army, and the surrounding countryside. The Khazars raided the province at will, sacking Ganza and attacking other settlements. Some detachments reached Mosul in the northern Jazira, adjacent to the Umayyad heartlands in Syria. Barjik reportedly defeated another Muslim army during Battle of Mousul, but this might have been the same battle.

The defeat at Ardabil—news of which spread even to Byzantium—was a shock to the Muslims, who faced an army penetrating deep into the Caliphate for the first time. Caliph Hisham again appointed Maslama to fight Barjik as governor of Armenia and Adharbayjan. Until Maslama could assemble enough forces, veteran military leader Sa'id ibn Amr al-Harashi was sent to stem the Khazar invasion. With a lance reportedly used at the Battle of Badr as a standard for his army and with 100,000 dirhams to recruit men, Sa'id went to Raqqa.

== Death ==
Barjik had dispersed small detachments after his victories, plundering the countryside, and the Arabs defeated them one by one. Sa'id recovered Akhlat on Lake Van, then moved northeast to Bardha'a and south to relieve the siege of Warthan. He encountered a 10,000-strong Khazar army near Bajarwan and defeated it in a surprise night attack, killing most of the Khazars and rescuing their 5,000 Muslim prisoners (who included al-Jarrah's daughter).

Barjik retreated north, with Sa'id in pursuit. Muslim sources record a number of other, heavily embellished attacks by Sa'id on improbably large Khazar armies; in one, Barjik was reportedly killed in single combat with the Umayyad general. Generally considered "romance rather than history", by historians, they may be contemporary, but imaginative, retellings of Sa'id's campaign. According to Blankinship, "The various battles fought and rescues of Muslim prisoners achieved by Sa'id in these sources seem to all go back to a single battle near Bajarwan".

Dunlop and Blainkinship argues that Barjik managed to retreat into fortress of Derbent, where he fortified himself with a Khazar garrison of 1,000 men and their families, waiting for the main army to arrive for help. Maslama advanced north before being forced to retreat after a confrontation with the main Khazar army under the khagan. Leaving their campfires burning, the Arabs withdrew in the middle of the night and quickly reached Derbent in a series of forced marches. The Khazars shadowed Maslama's march south and attacked him near Derbent, but the Arab army (augmented by local levies) resisted until a small, elite force attacked the khagan's tent and wounded him. The Muslims, encouraged, then defeated the Khazars. The Khagan previously mentioned may have been Barjik who died of wounds, shortly after.

The khagan mentioned throughout the war, might have been Barjik. There was no other recorded Khagan at that time, Barjik's predecessor Busir died in 711, Barjik succeeded as the khagan or khagan-bek in 711 or 715. Parsbit was a Khazar noblewoman and 'the mother of the infant-khagan' during 730s. Barjik, who might have been the khagan or the son of khagan as his successor was already an adult during this time, which makes it impossible for an infant-khagan to exist during his lifetime. Barjik died in early 730s and was succeeded by Bihar (Khazar), and Parsbit was known for being a regent thouroughout 730s. It is possible that Parsbit as the Queen was Barjik's wife, and ruled in the name of Barjik and her infant son Bihar as regent until he reached adulthood, due to unexpected death of Barjik.
