= Synod of Rome (732) =

The Synod of Rome (732) was a synod held in Rome in the year 732 under the authority of Pope Gregory III.

== Decrees of the synod ==
Pope Gregory convoked a new synod in 732 to prescribe duties of the monks of the three monasteries, whose duty it was to sing the Liturgy of the Hours in St. Peter's Basilica. Present were Pope Gregory himself, seven bishops, of whom six were from the east, nineteen priests, eighteen of whom were of eastern origin, and five deacons, all of whom were either Syrian or Greek.

The synod decreed that the monks should recite part of the divine office in the oratory of Sancta Maria in Cancellis, which Gregory had just recently constructed. The synod also prescribed the correct prayers (rubrics) for the Mass that was to be said within the oratory on the Feast days of each of the saints whose remains were kept in the oratory. Gregory then proceeded to add a few words to the Canon of the Mass itself, with explicit instructions that it was only to be used in the Mass celebrated within the oratory. This restriction was observed as the canon of the Mass had been left untouched since the pontificate of Pope Gregory I, and was believed to be against apostolic tradition to modify it in any way

The acts of this synod, with the newly prescribed prayers and changes to the Mass were engraved on marble tablets and placed within the oratory.
