= Sa'id ibn Amr al-Harashi =

- Born: Qinnasrin, Syria
- Children: Yazid; Nadr; Anbasa; Yahya
- Relatives: Amr al-Harashi (father)
- Military career
- Allegiance: Umayyad Caliphate
- Conflicts: Muslim conquest of Transoxiana, Arab–Khazar wars

Sa'id ibn Amr al-Harashi (Arabic: سعيد بن عمرو الحرشي, romanized: Saʿīd ibn ʿAmr al-Ḥarashī, fl. 720–735) was a prominent Arab general and governor of the Umayyad Caliphate, who played an important role in the Arab–Khazar wars.

== Biography ==
Sa'id ibn Amr al-Harashi was a Qaysi from Qinnasrin, Syria. He appears on the side of the Umayyad prince and general Maslama ibn Abd al-Malik in 720, when the latter was sent into Iraq to quell Yazid ibn al-Muhallab's rebellion. Umar ibn Hubayra, who was installed as the new governor of Iraq, appointed Sa'id as governor of Basra, and, shortly after (in 722–723), of Khurasan.

In this position, Sa'id was able to swiftly restore the Muslim position in Transoxiana, which was threatened by a large-scale Soghdian rebellion and the first attacks of the Turgesh nomads. Sa'id rallied the Muslims and took to the offensive, crushing the Soghdian rebels near Samarkand and then proceeding to capture the important city of Khujand, thereby restoring Muslim control over most of Transoxiana except for the Fergana Valley. However, his brutality in suppressing the Soghdian revolt, and his strict enforcement of the jizya on the native population, merely reinforced their hostility towards Arab rule. Despite his oppressive measures, however, he was unable to forward enough tax revenue to Iraq, and was replaced by Muslim ibn Sa'id al-Kilabi.

Map of the Caucasus region c. 740

After his dismissal, Sa'id returned to Syria. He re-appears in December 730, when he was called upon to halt the unprecedented Kazar advance into the Caliphate following their crushing victory in the Battle of Marj Ardabil. The Caliph Hisham ibn Abd al-Malik, close to panic, brought Sa'id to his residence at Rusafa and appointed him to lead an army against the Khazars, but he had few troops at hand. Instead, he gave Sa'id a lance said to have been used in the Battle of Badr to be his standard, as well as 100,000 silver dirhams to recruit men as he went north. Although the forces he could muster immediately (including survivors from Ardabil who had to be paid ten gold dinars to be persuaded to fight) were small, Sa'id managed to recover Akhlat on Lake Van. From there he moved north to Bardha'a and south again to relieve the siege of Warthan. Near Bajarwan, Sa'id came upon a 10,000-strong Khazar army under the Khazar khagan's son, which he defeated, killing most of the Khazars and rescuing the prisoners they had with them. The surviving Khazars fled north, with Sa'id in pursuit. Despite this success, Sa'id was relieved of his command in early 731 and even imprisoned for a while at Qabala as the result of the jealousy of Maslama ibn Abd al-Malik, whom Hisham now appointed as governor of Armenia and Adharbayjan and charged with command against the Khazars.

In spring 733, however, Sa'id was rehabilitated and appointed in turn as governor of Armenia and Adharbayjan, following the somewhat lacklustre performance of Maslama and another Umayyad prince, Marwan ibn Muhammad (the future Marwan II), against the Khazars over the previous years. Nevertheless, for the duration of Sa'id tenure, he remained on the defensive, possibly as a result of the exhaustion of his troops in the long conflict with the Khazars. Due to the loss of his eyesight, Sa'id was forced to resign his post, probably in early 735.

== Family ==
Sa'id had several sons who were active as military leaders and governors for both the Umayyads and the Abbasids: Yazid was killed in Ifriqiya, Nadr was Marwan II's governor of Iraq, Anbasa commanded the troops of Qinnasrin in 785/786, and another, Yahya, served as governor of Egypt in 779/780.

== Sources ==
- Blankinship, Khalid Yahya (1994). The End of the Jihâd State: The Reign of Hishām ibn ʻAbd al-Malik and the Collapse of the Umayyads. Albany, New York: State University of New York Press. ISBN 978-0-7914-1827-7.
- Crone, Patricia (1980). Slaves on Horses: The Evolution of the Islamic Polity (1980 ed.). Cambridge: Cambridge University Press. ISBN 978-0521229616.

Preceded by Sa'id ibn Abd al-Aziz	Governor of Khurasan; 722–723	Succeeded by Muslim ibn Sa'id al-Kilabi
Preceded by Marwan ibn Muhammad	Governor of Armenia and Adharbayjan; 733–735	Succeeded by Marwan ibn Muhammad
