= Siege of Narbonne (737) =

Frankish expedition and siege in Septimania

- Part of the Islamic invasion of Gaul
Date	737
Location	Narbonne, France 43°11′03″N 3°0′11″E
Result	Frankish Christian military success against the Umayyad Caliphate; Politically inconclusive: Frankish king Charles Martel besieged the city of Narbonne; Relieving Arab-Berber Muslim forces defeated by the Christian Franks at the battle of the River Berre; Umayyad strongholds destroyed by the Christian Franks throughout the whole region of Septimania; Andalusian garrison confined within the city of Narbonne.

Belligerents
Umayyad Caliphate	Kingdom of Francia

Commanders and leaders
Yusuf al-Fihri; Uqba ibn al-Hajjaj	Charles Martel
- Location within France

The siege of Narbonne was fought in 737 between the Arab and Berber Muslim forces of Yusuf ibn Abd al-Rahman al-Fihri, Arab Umayyad Muslim governor of Septimania on behalf of al-Andalus, and the Frankish Christian army led by the Carolingian duke Charles Martel.

== Background ==
The region of Septimania, in southern Gaul, was the last unconquered province of the Visigothic Kingdom. The incursion into Septimania was motivated by the need to secure their territorial gains in Iberia. Arab and Berber Muslim forces began to campaign in Septimania in 719.

The region of Septimania was invaded by al-Samh ibn Malik al-Khawlani, wāli (governor-general) of al-Andalus, in 719, and subsequently occupied by the Arab and Berber Muslim forces in 720. The region was renamed Arbūnah and turned into a military base for future operations by the Andalusian military commanders.

By 721, al-Samh was reinforced and ready to lay siege to Toulouse, a possession that would open up the bordering region of Aquitaine to him on the same terms as Septimania. But his plans were thwarted in the disastrous battle of Toulouse in 721; the Aquitanian Christian army led by Odo the Great, Duke of Aquitaine defeated the Umayyad Muslim army and achieved a decisive and significant victory. The surviving Umayyad forces drove away from Aquitaine with immense losses, in which al-Samh was so seriously wounded that he soon died at Narbonne.

Arab and Berber Muslim forces, soundly based in the stronghold of Narbonne and easily resupplied by sea, struck in the 720s, conquering Carcassonne on the north-western fringes of Septimania (725) and penetrating and raiding other cities. In 731, the Berber lord of the region of Cerdagne, Uthman ibn Naissa, called Munuza by the Franks, was an ally of the Duke of Aquitaine Odo the Great after he revolted against the Emirate of Córdoba, but the rebel lord was killed by the Arab Umayyad commander Abd al-Rahman ibn Abd Allah al-Ghafiqi.

== Battle ==
Following the successful military campaigns of the Carolingian duke Charles Martel at the battle of Poitiers in 732 and the siege of Avignon in 737, he went on to attack the city of Narbonne, but the local nobility of Gothic and Gallo-Roman stock had concluded different military and political arrangements with the Arab Umayyad governor due to their fear of the expanding Frankish realm.

However, when the Umayyads sent reinforcements from Muslim-ruled Iberia, the Frankish Christian army intercepted a sizeable group of Arab-Berber Muslim troops led by Uqba ibn al-Hajjaj along the banks of the River Berre (located in the present-day Department of Aude) and achieved a decisive and significant victory against the Umayyad invaders, after which the Frankish army marched on Nîmes.

In the aftermath of their resounding victory against the relieving Arab-Berber Muslim forces, the Frankish Christian army pursued the fleeing Arab-Berber Muslim troops into the nearby sea-lagoons, "taking much booty and many prisoners". Martel's forces then devastated the principal Umayyad settlements of Septimania, as the Frankish army marched on Agde, Béziers, Maguelonne, and Nîmes.

== Retreat ==
The Frankish Mayor of the Palace Charles Martel may have been able to take Narbonne had he been willing to commit his army and full resources for an indefinite siege, but he was not willing or able to do so. Probably he found that Hunald I, Duke of Aquitaine, was threatening his line of communication with the north. Meanwhile Maurontius, Duke of Provence, from his unconquered city of Marseille, raised a revolt against him from the rear. The Frankish king may have considered accomplished his primary goals by destroying the Arab Muslim armies in Septimania, and leaving the remaining Arab and Berber garrison confined within the city of Narbonne.

A second Frankish expedition was led later in 739 to expel the inconvenient count Maurontius, who couldn't expect this time Andalusian relief, from Marseille and regain control of Provence. According to Paul the Deacon's historical treatise Historia Langobardorum (787–796), the Arabs retreated when they learned that Martel had formed an alliance with the Lombards.
