= Berre (Aude) =

River in France

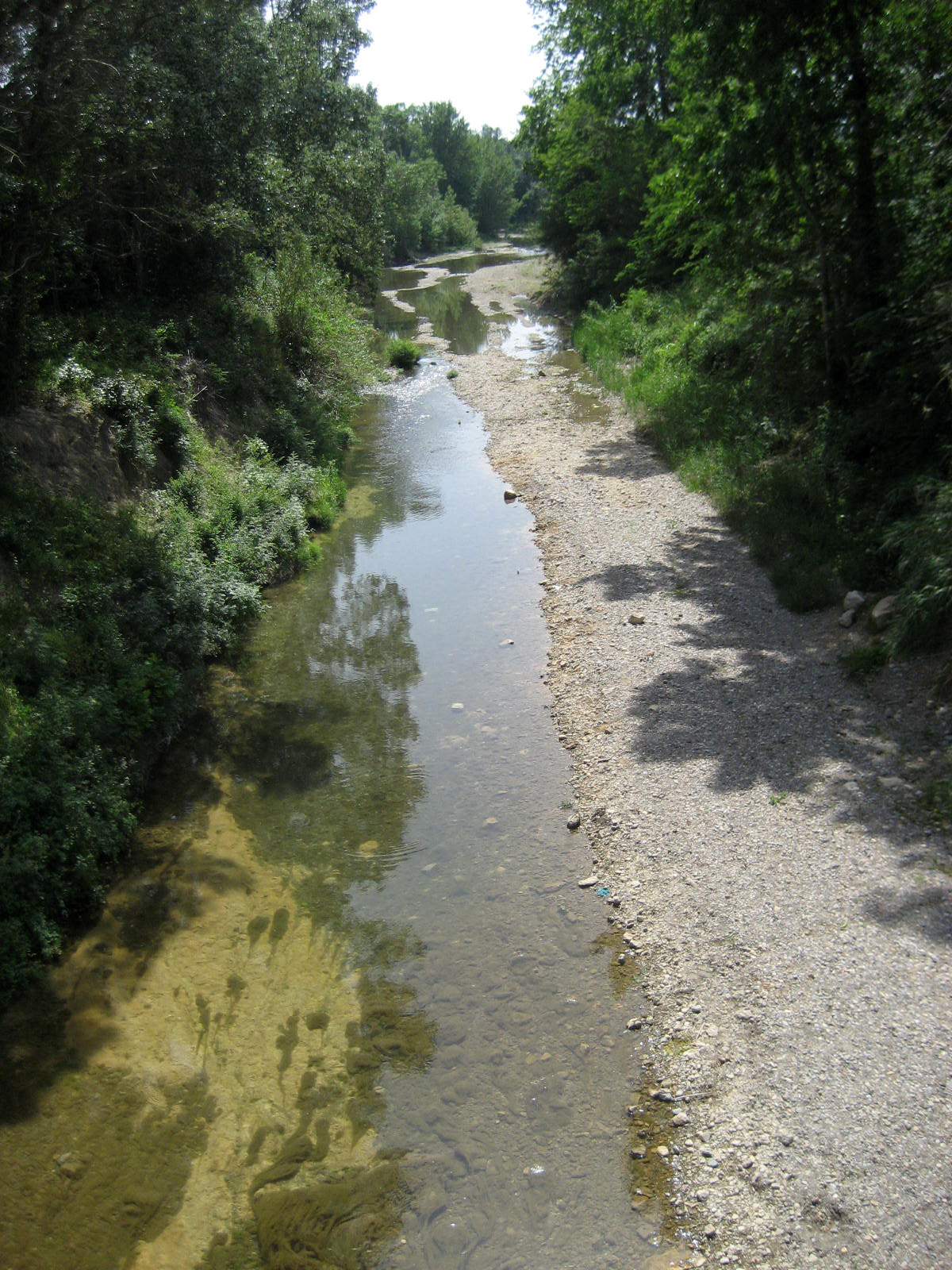

- Location within France Location within Occitanie
- Native name: la Berre (French)

Physical characteristics
- Source
  - location: Quintillan
  - coordinates: 42.9528°N 2.7025°E
- Mouth: Mediterranean Sea
  - location: Port-la-Nouvelle
  - coordinates: 43.0134°N 3.0687°E
- Length: 52.8 km (32.8 mi)

The Berre (French pronunciation: [bɛʁ]) is a coastal river flowing through the Aude department in the Occitanie region of France. It is 52.8 km (32.8 mi) long. It discharges into the Mediterranean Sea at Port-la-Nouvelle.

== See also ==
- Berre (Rhône), a river in France, affluent of the Rhône
