= Parsbit =

Khazarian noblewoman

Parsbit, also known as Prisbit, was a Khazar noble active in the 730s CE.

== Identification with Barjik Qaghan ==
A. N. Kurat has mentioned that the Ibn A'tham al-Küfi forms of Barjik's name are garblings translating into Barsbek. The name Barsbek is an old Turkic male name and a male given title meaning Leopard-Lord. However this name was also given to Parsbit. However Parsbit is woman, and regarded as 'Mayr (mother) of the Qaghan.'

However Czegledy suggest that this text in Łewond's text is misread and should be read as 'Hayr (father) of the Qaghan'. The Qaghan in question is future Qaghan Bihar (Khazar). Bihar is accepted as Barjik's son and successor. This leads us to conclusion that Parsbit is the mother of Bihar and Barjik as the father of Bihar. However Czegledy's suggestion cause problems, as well as the name Parsbit and Barjik's association with the name 'Barsbek', leading to the idea of Parsbit and Barjik being the same person.

The sources mention that Barjik was the commander of 'Campaign of 730' with his brother Khagan Oglu, Tarmach, and a certain Tarkhan. The sources also mention Parsbit giving orders. However since Barjik is the Khagan and the commander of all forces at the time, Parsbit in this situation has no authority to order.

With current the situation, no conclusion can be reached, with the biggest and the most likely possibilities being Parsbit is either Barjik's wife or himself.

== Sources ==
- Golden, Peter B. (1980), Khazar Studies: An Historio-Philological Inquiry into the Origins of the Khazars, Budapest: Akadémiai Kiadó
