= Battle of the River Berre =

8th-century battle in Septimania

Coordinates: 43°26′45″N 5°6′50″E

The Battle of the River Berre was fought in 737 between the Arab and Berber Muslim forces of Yusuf ibn Abd al-Rahman al-Fihri, Arab Umayyad Muslim governor of Septimania on behalf of al-Andalus, and the Frankish Christian army led by the Carolingian duke Charles Martel during the siege of Narbonne. The battle, which took place at the mouth of the River Berre (located in the present-day Department of Aude), was a significant victory for Charles Martel in the military campaigns of 736–737. During this period, Martel effectively prevented greater Umayyad expansion beyond the Pyrenees.

== History ==
Following the successful military campaigns of the Carolingian duke Charles Martel at the battle of Poitiers in 732 and the siege of Avignon in 737, he went on to attack the city of Narbonne, but the local nobility of Gothic and Gallo-Roman stock had concluded different military and political arrangements with the Arab Umayyad governor due to their fear of the expanding Frankish realm. However, the Frankish Christian army intercepted a sizeable group of Arab-Berber Muslim troops sent from Islamic Iberia and led by Uqba ibn al-Hajjaj along the banks of the River Berre, whose purpose was to relieve the Umayyad garrison during the siege of Narbonne. After their resounding victory against the relieving Arab-Berber Muslim forces, the Frankish Christian army pursued the fleeing Arab-Berber Muslim troops into the nearby sea-lagoons, "taking much booty and many prisoners". Martel's forces then devastated the principal Umayyad settlements of Septimania, as the Frankish army marched on Agde, Béziers, Maguelonne, and Nîmes.

The Carolingian duke Charles Martel may have been able to take Narbonne had he been willing to commit his army and full resources for an indefinite siege, but he was not willing or able to do so. Probably he found that Hunald I, Duke of Aquitaine, was threatening his line of communication with the north. Meanwhile Maurontius, Duke of Provence, from his unconquered city of Marseille, raised a revolt against him from the rear. The Frankish king may have considered accomplished his primary goals by destroying the Arab Muslim armies in Septimania, and leaving the remaining Arab and Berber garrison confined within the city of Narbonne.

A second Frankish expedition was led later in 739 to expel the inconvenient count Maurontius, who couldn't expect this time Andalusian relief, from Marseille and regain control of Provence. According to Paul the Deacon's historical treatise Historia Langobardorum (787–796), the Arabs retreated when they learned that Martel had formed an alliance with the Lombards.
