= 669 =

Calendar year

669 in various calendars
| Gregorian calendar | 669; DCLXIX |
| Ab urbe condita | 1422 |
| Armenian calendar | 118; ԹՎ ՃԺԸ |
| Assyrian calendar | 5419 |
| Balinese saka calendar | 590–591 |
| Bengali calendar | 75–76 |
| Berber calendar | 1619 |
| Buddhist calendar | 1213 |
| Burmese calendar | 31 |
| Byzantine calendar | 6177–6178 |
| Chinese calendar | 戊辰年 (Earth Dragon); 3366 or 3159 — to — 己巳年 (Earth Snake); 3367 or 3160 |
| Coptic calendar | 385–386 |
| Discordian calendar | 1835 |
| Ethiopian calendar | 661–662 |
| Hebrew calendar | 4429–4430 |
- Hindu calendars
| Vikram Samvat | 725–726 |
| Shaka Samvat | 590–591 |
| Kali Yuga | 3769–3770 |
| Holocene calendar | 10669 |
| Iranian calendar | 47–48 |
| Islamic calendar | 48–49 |
| Japanese calendar | Hakuchi 20 (白雉２０年) |
| Javanese calendar | 560–561 |
| Julian calendar | 669; DCLXIX |
| Korean calendar | 3002 |
| Minguo calendar | 1243 before ROC 民前1243年 |
| Nanakshahi calendar | −799 |
| Seleucid era | 980/981 AG |
| Thai solar calendar | 1211–1212 |
| Tibetan calendar | ས་ཕོ་འབྲུག་ལོ་ (male Earth-Dragon); 795 or 414 or −358 — to — ས་མོ་སྦྲུལ་ལོ་ (female Earth-Snake); 796 or 415 or −357 |

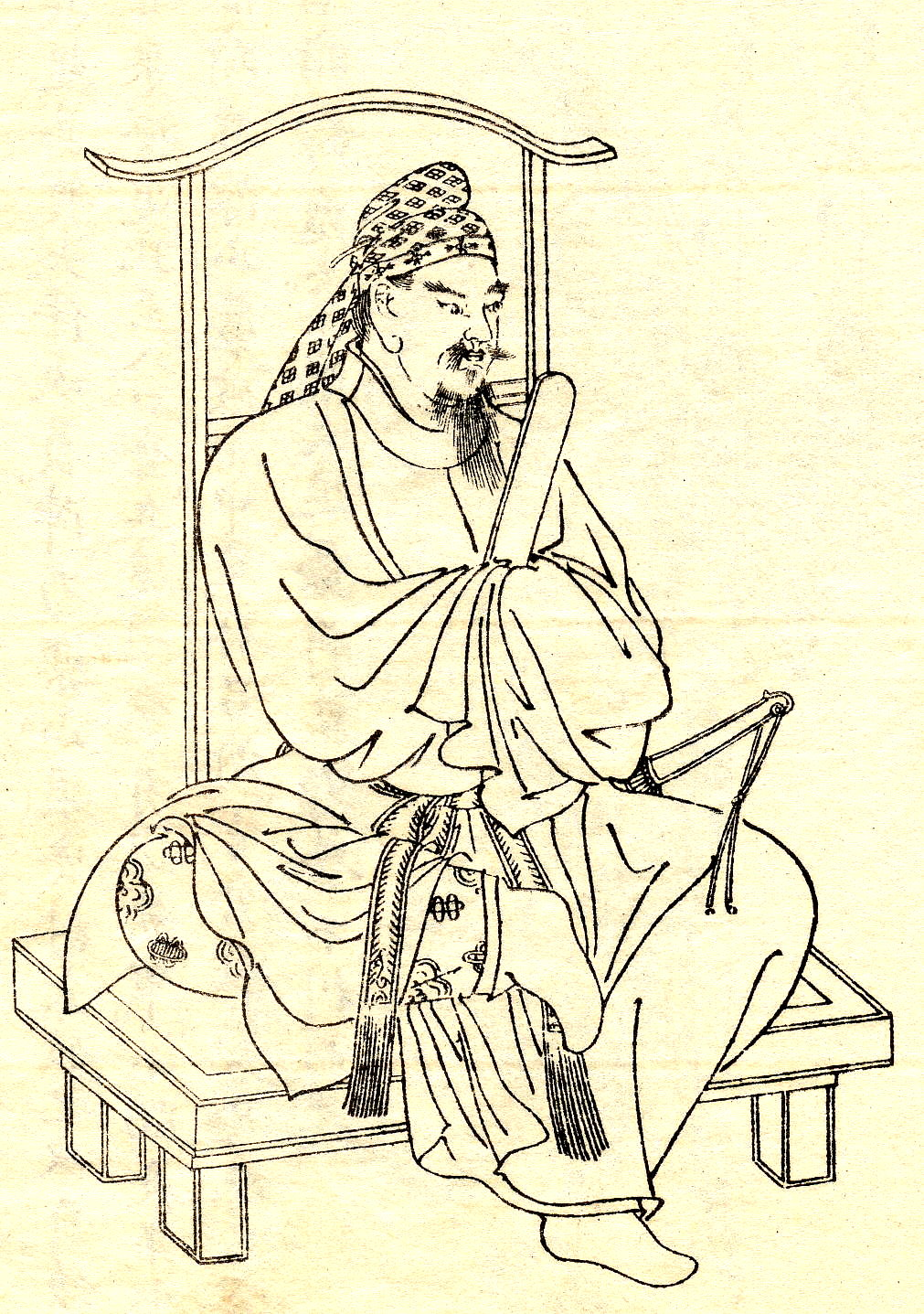
Fujiwara no Kamatari (614–669)

Year 669 (DCLXIX) was a common year starting on Monday of the Julian calendar. The denomination 669 for this year has been used since the early medieval period, when the Anno Domini calendar era became the prevalent method in Europe for naming years.

== Events ==
=== By place ===
==== Byzantine Empire ====
- Spring – Arab forces that have taken Chalcedon, on the Asian shore of the Bosporus, threaten the Byzantine capital Constantinople. The Muslim-Arabs are decimated by famine and disease. Yazid, the Arab commander, retreats to the island of Cyzicus (modern Turkey).

==== Britain ====
- King Ecgberht of Kent loses the overlordship of Surrey to King Wulfhere of Mercia. Ecgberht then grants the old Saxon Shore Fort at Reculver (south-east England) to a priest named Bassa, in order to establish a monastery dedicated to St. Mary (approximate date).

==== Asia ====
- November 14 – Kamatari, Japanese statesman and reformer, receives the surname Fujiwara from Emperor Tenji as a reward for his services, but dies in Yamato prefecture (modern-day Sakurai City). ^{[Significance of this event is unclear]}

== Births ==
- Gregory II, pope of the Catholic Church (d. 731)
- Justinian II, Byzantine emperor (approximate date)
- Qutayba ibn Muslim, Arab general (approximate date)

== Deaths ==
- January 1 – Javanshir, king of Caucasian Albania (b. 616)
- November 14 – Fujiwara no Kamatari, founder of the Fujiwara clan (b. 614)
- December 31 – Li Shiji, general and chancellor of the Tang dynasty (b. 594)
- Jaruman, bishop of Mercia (approximate date)
- Mezezius, Byzantine usurper (approximate date)
