= 799 =

Calendar year

799 in various calendars
| Gregorian calendar | 799; DCCXCIX |
| Ab urbe condita | 1552 |
| Armenian calendar | 248; ԹՎ ՄԽԸ |
| Assyrian calendar | 5549 |
| Balinese saka calendar | 720–721 |
| Bengali calendar | 205–206 |
| Berber calendar | 1749 |
| Buddhist calendar | 1343 |
| Burmese calendar | 161 |
| Byzantine calendar | 6307–6308 |
| Chinese calendar | 戊寅年 (Earth Tiger); 3496 or 3289 — to — 己卯年 (Earth Rabbit); 3497 or 3290 |
| Coptic calendar | 515–516 |
| Discordian calendar | 1965 |
| Ethiopian calendar | 791–792 |
| Hebrew calendar | 4559–4560 |
- Hindu calendars
| Vikram Samvat | 855–856 |
| Shaka Samvat | 720–721 |
| Kali Yuga | 3899–3900 |
| Holocene calendar | 10799 |
| Iranian calendar | 177–178 |
| Islamic calendar | 182–183 |
| Japanese calendar | Enryaku 18 (延暦１８年) |
| Javanese calendar | 694–695 |
| Julian calendar | 799; DCCXCIX |
| Korean calendar | 3132 |
| Minguo calendar | 1113 before ROC 民前1113年 |
| Nanakshahi calendar | −669 |
| Seleucid era | 1110/1111 AG |
| Thai solar calendar | 1341–1342 |
| Tibetan calendar | ས་ཕོ་སྟག་ལོ་ (male Earth-Tiger); 925 or 544 or −228 — to — ས་མོ་ཡོས་ལོ་ (female Earth-Hare); 926 or 545 or −227 |

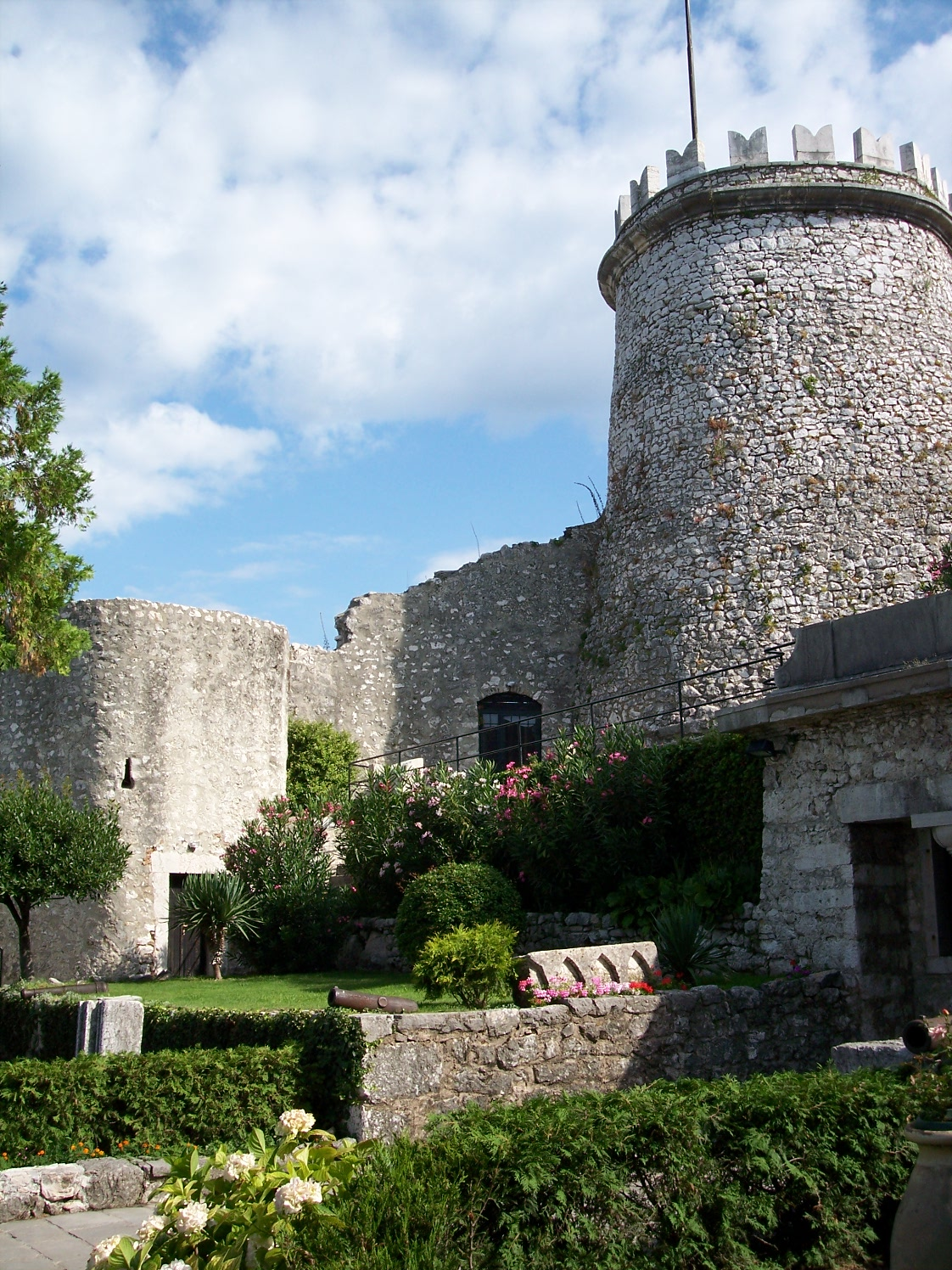
Trsat Castle in the city of Rijeka (Croatia)

Year 799 (DCCXCIX) was a common year starting on Tuesday of the Julian calendar. The denomination 799 for this year has been used since the early medieval period, when the Anno Domini calendar era became the prevalent method in Europe for naming years.

== Events ==
=== By place ===
==== Europe ====
- Autumn – Siege of Trsat: Višeslav, prince or duke of Dalmatian Croatia, decisively defeats an invading Frankish army under Eric of Friuli, during the siege at the fortress city of Trsat (Rijeka).
- The Vikings raid the island of Noirmoutier, and attack the monastery of Saint Philibert of Jumièges.

==== Britain ====
- King Eardwulf of Northumbria, worried about further rivals, has ealdorman Moll killed. Former king Osbald dies as an abbot in exile. He is buried in an unmarked grave in York Minster.

=== By topic ===
==== Religion ====
- April 25 – Pope Leo III is physically attacked by a band of aristocratic conspirators, under the leadership of a public official who is a nephew of the late Pope Adrian I. After mistreatment and attempted disfigurement by the citizens of Rome, Leo flees to the court of King Charlemagne at Paderborn (modern Germany) to seek protection. He sends him back with Frankish agents, and restores him to the papal throne.

== Births ==
- Jiang Shen, chancellor of the Tang Dynasty (d. 881)
- Langdarma, emperor of Tibet (approximate date)
- Zhang Yichao, Chinese general (approximate date)

== Deaths ==
- April 13 – Paul the Deacon, Lombard monk and historian
- September 4 – Musa al-Kadhim, seventh Twelver Shī‘ah Imam (b. 745)
- Eric, duke of Friuli
- Gerold, Alamannian nobleman
- Huaisu, Chinese Buddhist monk (b. 737)
- Osbald, king of Northumbria
