= Swæfberht of Essex =

Swæfberht of Essex was King of Essex (715–738).

He ruled along with Saelred of Essex (709–746) who appointed him provisional king in 715.

Preceded by Saelred	King of Essex c. 715 – 738; Joint rule with Saelred c. 715 – 738	Succeeded by Saelred
