= Saelred of Essex =

King of Essex

Saelred of Essex (also known as Selered) reigned as King of Essex from c. 709 to 746. His claim to the throne was due to descent from Sledd of Essex, the dynastic founder. For part of his reign he probably ruled jointly with Swaefbert, who, it is speculated, may have ruled the sub-kingdom of Middlesex. His date of death is known from an entry in the Anglo-Saxon Chronicle although the circumstances are not recorded.

Saelred was succeeded by Swithred, grandson of Sigeheard. Saelred's own son Sigeric succeeded Swithred.

Like his predecessors, Saelred was not an independent ruler, but a dependent of the Kingdom of Mercia.

== Notes ==
Preceded by Offa	King of Essex c. 709 – 746; Joint rule with Swaefbert c. 715 – 738	Succeeded by Swithred
