= Bihar (Khazar) =

- Khagan of Khazaria
- Reign: 732 – 740/755
- Predecessor: Barjik
- Successor: Baghatur
- Regent: Parsbit
- Born: 707?
- Died: 740 or 755
- Issue: Tzitzak; Baghatur
- Dynasty: Ashina

Bihar was a Khagan of the Khazars during the 730s. Bihar might be identical to Busir Irbis (Gr: Buzeros Yrbis) mentioned in Roman sources.

== Life ==
Bihar succeeded Barjik as the Khagan in 732, after a regency under Parsbit according to Armenian sources, however no reason was given for a regency, Bihar at that time was already an adult, which makes it more confusing as why there was a regency in the first place. In addition, some sources claim that Khazars practiced regicide or elevation of one of the Khagan's adult brother to the throne, which makes it impossible for an infant-khagan to rule.

The Khazarian noble Bulan and/or Sabriel might have flourished during his reign. It is unknown whether Bihar was still alive when Bulanids attempted to impose Judaism on Khazars.

Bihar was the father of Tzitzak, the Khazar princess who married the son of Byzantine Emperor Leo III who later ruled as Constantine V. Bihar was thus the grandfather of Emperor Leo IV the Khazar. He is called Viharos in Armenian sources.
