= Uqba ibn al-Hajjaj =

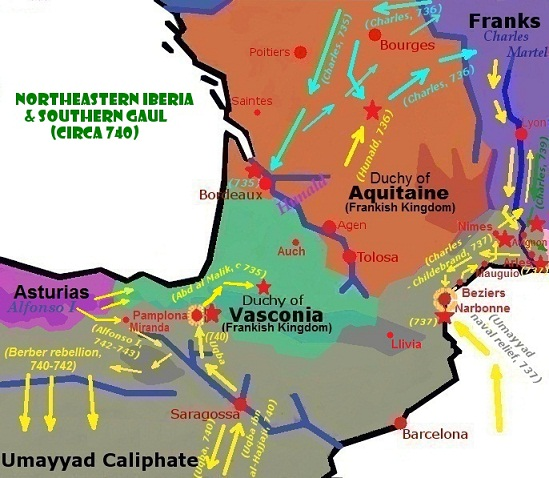
Military campaigns around the Pyrenees and Septimania at the time of Uqba's office

Uqba ibn al-Hajjaj al-Saluli (Arabic: عُقْبَة بن الْحَجَّاج السَّلُولِيِّ الهَوازِنِيِّ, romanized: ʿUqba ibn al-Ḥajjāj al-Salūlī) was an Umayyad governor of al-Andalus from 734 to 740 (or 737 to 742 according to other sources), appointed by Ubayd Allah ibn al-Habhab.

The new wali of Al-Andalus denounced the self-enriching excesses in taxation imposed by Abd al-Malik ibn Katan al-Fihri, imprisoned him and his officials. Uqba ibn al-Hajjaj in turn made a new census, followed by a more rigorous tax collection. He likewise decreed that each person be judged according to the law of their own people, meaning that the Islamic law of the conquerors did not apply at this stage to the previous inhabitants of Iberia, with the Visigothic Forum Iudicum being still enforced on former inhabitants of the Visigothic Kingdom.

This time, however, saw the commencement of serious internal unrest when the Berbers of North Africa rebelled against a new taxation exacted on them despite being Muslim—usually applying only to non-Muslims. Not only that, the youths were forcibly recruited for the military and maidens forced to provide for the harem of the Caliph in Damascus. At the same time, a new egalitarian predicament, the Kharijitism, was entering Al-Andalus, widely embraced by the Berbers.

In 737 Uqba ibn al-Hajjaj sent over an expedition to help the Muslim governor of Narbonne in his fight against the Frankish Charles Martel, but the expedition was routed by the Carolingian leader in the Battle of the River Berre. In 739 (or 740) the governor imposed a garrison and direct central rule in Pamplona, an outpost that may have been held up to that point by the Franks (or probably Basque-Aquitanians) since the aftermath of the Battle of Poitiers (732).

Shortly after, the governor marched over the northern tip of Africa and Tangier to quash a Berber uprising, and ultimately provoked a killing that spurred his downfall.

== Notes ==
Preceded by Abd al-Malik ibn Katan al-Fihri	Governor of Al-Andalus; 734-740	Succeeded by Abd al-Malik ibn Katan al-Fihri
