= Synods of Rome (731) =

The Synods of Rome in 731 were two synods held in St. Peter’s Basilica in the year 731 under the authority of Pope Gregory III to defend the practice of Icon veneration.

== First Synod ==
Upon the election of Pope Gregory III as the Bishop of Rome in February 731, he wrote a series of letters to the Iconoclast Byzantine Emperor Leo III, expressing his condemnation of the practice of Iconoclasm and the persecution of the traditional venerators of religious images in the east. Gregory handed the letters to an envoy, a priest named George, with orders to deliver them to the eastern emperor directly. However, upon reaching Constantinople, George was afraid of incurring the emperor’s wrath, and so he returned to Rome without having delivered the letters.

Infuriated by George’s actions, Gregory summoned a synod sometime before October 731, with the intent of stripping George of his priesthood. However, the Synod, after confirming the importance of expressing the Roman Church’s opposition to iconoclasm, recommended that George merely be reprimanded. He was to perform a penance for his unwillingness to complete his assigned task, and for the Pope to dispatch him again to Emperor Leo III with the pope’s letters.

== Second Synod ==
When George resumed his commission, he only made it as far as Sicily, where he was arrested by the strategos Sergius on Leo’s orders and held in prison for over a year. In response to this, Gregory summoned a new synod which met in Rome, at the shrine of Saint Peter, on November 1, 731. Ninety-three western bishops participated, including Anthony, Patriarch of Grado and John, Archbishop of Ravenna. Also in attendance were all of the Roman lower clergy present in the city at the time, as well as a good number of the Roman nobility. The presence of the Archbishop of Ravenna in the synod was a clear indication of just how far Leo's iconoclasm had offended even his supporters in Italy.

The synod issued a ruling, outlining the traditional Roman position as articulated by previous popes, in support of Icon veneration, and condemned iconoclasm as a heresy. They also decreed that:

”if anyone, for the future, shall take away, destroy, or dishonour the images of Our Lord God and Saviour Jesus Christ, of His Mother, the immaculate and glorious Virgin Mary, or of the Saints, he shall be excluded from the body and blood of Our Lord and the unity of the Church.”

Gregory then entrusted a new letter in favour of icons to the Defensor Constantine who was to take it to the emperor. He was also imprisoned in Sicily, and the letter confiscated. Representatives of various Italian cities who also attempted to send similar letters to Constantinople had the same result. Gregory made a final attempt, this time entrusting two letters to his new Defensor Peter, one for Patriarch Anastasius of Constantinople, and one for the two emperors, Leo and his son Constantine, without success.

In response to the synod’s opposition to iconoclasm, in 733 Leo sent out a fleet under the command of the strategos of the Cibyrrhaeot Theme, but it was shipwrecked in the Adriatic Sea. He then confiscated papal territory in Sicily and Calabria, and raised taxes there. Further, he not only removed Sicily and Calabria from the jurisdiction of the pope, but he also did the same to all the territory within the former Praetorian prefecture of Illyricum, transferring it to the authority of the Patriarch of Constantinople, although at that time in practice it only meant Byzantine Greece and the Aegean islands, which were under the emperor’s direct control.

The synod also ruled on the ongoing quarrel over the jurisdiction of the Patriarchs of Grado and Aquileia. It ruled that the Patriarch of Grado was to be the primate over the entirety of Venetia and Istria, while the Patriarch of Aquileia would only retain ecclesiastical control over Cormons.
