= Pope Gregory III =

Head of the Catholic Church from 731 to 741

Pope Saint Gregory III
- Bishop of Rome
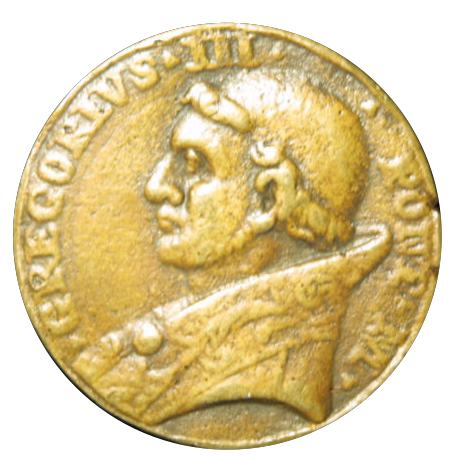
- Undated medal depicting Gregory III
- Church: Catholic Church
- Papacy began: 11 February 731
- Papacy ended: 28 November 741
- Predecessor: Gregory II
- Successor: Zachary
- Previous post: Cardinal-Deacon (726–731)

Orders
- Created cardinal: 726 by Gregory II

Personal details
- Born: Bilad al-Sham, Umayyad Caliphate
- Died: 28 November 741 Rome, Italy, Eastern Roman Empire

Sainthood
- Feast day: 10 December
- Venerated in: Roman Catholic Church; Eastern Orthodox Church

Pope Gregory III (Latin: Gregorius III; died 28 November 741) was the bishop of Rome from 11 February 731 to his death on 28 November 741. His pontificate, like that of his predecessor, was disturbed by Byzantine iconoclasm and the advance of the Lombards, in which he invoked the intervention of Charles Martel, although ultimately in vain. He was the last pope to seek the consent of the Byzantine exarch of Ravenna for his election, the last pope of Syrian origin, and the last pope born outside Europe until the election of Pope Francis 1,272 years later in 2013.

== Election ==
Gregory was the son of a Syrian Christian named Ioannes, Yohannan or John. He was elected pope by popular acclamation on 11 February 731, but was not formally consecrated as bishop of Rome until 18 March, after having received the approval of the Byzantine exarch of Ravenna. He was the last pope to seek the exarch's ratification of a papal election.

== Anti-iconoclasm ==
Immediately upon his accession, Gregory appealed to Emperor Leo III to moderate his position on iconoclasm. When Gregory's representative was arrested on the orders of the emperor, Gregory called a synod in November 731, which condemned iconoclasm outright. Leo responded by trying to bring the pope under control, but the fleet he sent to enforce the imperial will was shipwrecked in the Adriatic Sea. He then proceeded to appropriate papal territories in Sicily and Calabria, and transferred ecclesiastical jurisdictions in the former praetorian prefecture of Illyricum to the patriarch of Constantinople. However, his attempt to force the duke of Naples to enforce an imperial decree to confiscate papal territory in the duchy failed, as the duke was supportive of the pope's stand.

Gregory, in the meantime, demonstrated his opposition to iconoclasm by emphasising his veneration of icons and relics. He repaired or beautified numerous churches, which involved their decoration with icons and images of Jesus Christ, the Virgin Mary and the saints. He ordered to be erected in the heart of St. Peter's Basilica an iconostasis, situated between six onyx and marble columns which had been sent to Gregory as a gift from the exarch Eutychius. He built a new oratory in St. Peter's Basilica to house the relics of a number of saints, convoking a synod in 732 in order to regulate the prayers and masses to be said there. Gregory was an enthusiastic supporter of monasticism; he established the monastery of St. Chrysogonus and rebuilt the hospice of Saints Sergius and Bacchus, near St. Peter's, endowing it for the support of the poor.

== Ecclesiastical policy ==
A temporary lull in the conflict between the Byzantines and the Lombards allowed Gregory to deal with some longstanding internal issues, in particular the ongoing jurisdictional dispute between the patriarchs of Grado and Aquileia. Although the Synod of 731 had adjudicated in this matter in favour of Grado, Gregory was forced to reprimand the patriarch of Aquileia, Calixtus, who had attempted to gain possession of the island of Barbana from Grado's jurisdiction. In 731, he approved the election of Tatwine as archbishop of Canterbury, after the latter came to Rome in person to ask for the pallium. Gregory approved of the election of his successor, Nothhelm, while in 735 he agreed to the request of King Ceolwulf of Northumbria that Bishop Egbert of York should be elevated to the rank of archbishop.

Gregory promoted the Church in northern Europe. He supported the continuing mission of Saint Boniface in Germany, elevating him to the rank of archbishop of Germany in 732; and, after a personal visit to Rome from Boniface in 737, where he was meant to attend a synod which does not appear to have been held, Gregory made Boniface a papal legate in Germany, and asked him to reorganize the episcopal sees in Germany. Gregory sent Boniface back to Bavaria with three letters. One commanded the bishops and higher ecclesiastical officers to provide Boniface with as much help as they could. A second was addressed to the nobles and people of Germany, urging them to obey Boniface. A third, addressed to the bishops in Alamannia and Bavaria, confirmed Boniface's status as the papal vicar, ordering them to assemble in a council twice a year at Augsburg under Boniface's authority. Gregory promoted the mission of Willibald in Germany.

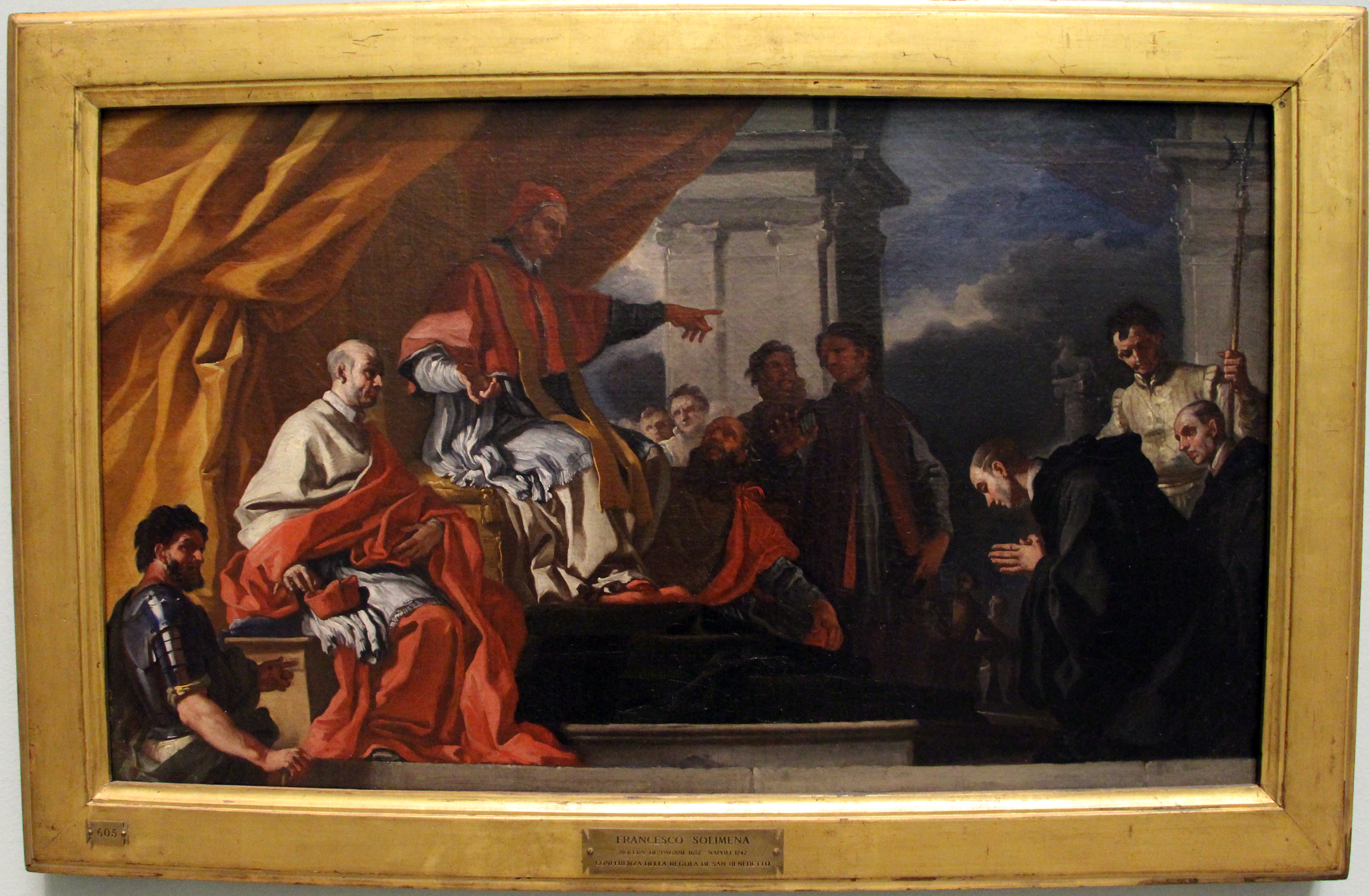
Gregory III (seated high centre) blesses the mission of Willibald (kneeling right) to the Saxons. (Francesco Solimena, 1701–05)

In 732, Gregory banned the consumption of horse meat, both domestic and wild, stating it is an "abomination" since it was associated with pagan ritual feasting.

== Lombard threat ==
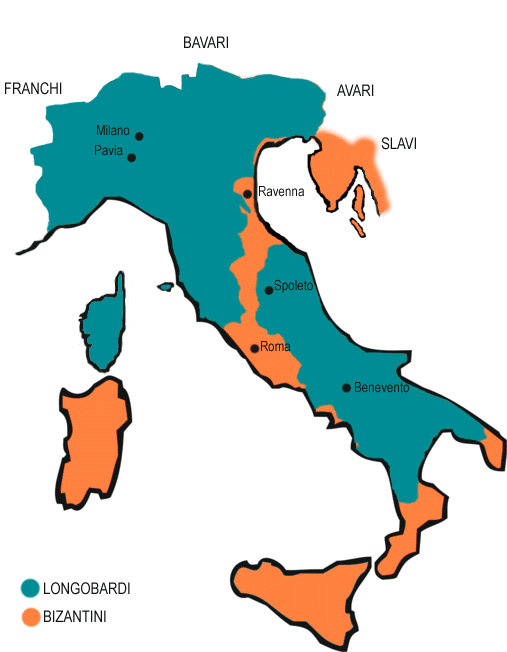
The division of Italy between the Lombards and the Byzantines during Gregory III's pontificate

Conscious of the ongoing Lombard threat, Gregory undertook and completed the restoration of the Aurelian Walls during the early 730s. He also refortified Centumcellae, purchasing from Thrasimund II of Spoleto the fortress of Gallese along the Via Flaminia, which had been taken by the Lombards, interrupting Rome's communications with the exarch at Ravenna. The return of the Lombard king Liutprand in 737 saw a renewal of the Lombard assault on the Exarchate of Ravenna.

Gregory's opposition to Byzantine iconoclasm did not stop his lending support to the Byzantine Empire to help in the recapture of Ravenna after it had fallen to the Lombards in around 738. In that same year, Liutprand demanded that the Lombard dukes of Spoleto and Beneventum ravage the area around the Duchy of Rome; but both refused, citing a treaty with the pope. Gregory then actively encouraged the rebellion of Thrasimund, forcing Liutprand to temporarily abandon his attacks on the exarchate, turning his attention towards Spoleto, which Liutprand annexed. Thrasimund was forced to flee Spoleto, seeking refuge in Rome, where he was welcomed by Gregory.

By the middle of 739, Liutprand was encroaching once again on the Exarchate and threatening Rome. In desperation, Gregory sent ambassadors to Charles Martel, the Frankish mayor of the Palace, begging him to intervene on the pope's behalf. Although Gregory stated that he was willing to give up his allegiance to the Eastern Empire and place himself under the protection of the Franks, Charles made no promise to assist, since he was fully occupied by the Umayyad invasion of Gaul. Gregory himself referred to these Saracen Muslims as gens ferocissima or "that most fierce nation". The Lombard capture of the towns of Ameria, Ortas, Polimartium and Blera once again caused Gregory to write to Charles, this time in even greater tones of despair, beseeching his aid:

Our affliction moves us to write to you once again, trusting that you are a loving son of St. Peter and of us, and that, from respect for him, you will come and defend the Church of God and His peculiar people, who are now unable to endure the persecution and oppression of the Lombards. They have seized the very means set aside to furnish funds for the lights ever kept burning at St. Peter's tomb, and they have carried off offerings that have been made by you and by those who have gone before you. And because, after God, we have turned to you, the Lombards deride and oppress us. Hence the Church of St. Peter has been stripped and reduced to the last straits. We have put into the mouth of the bearer of this letter, your faithful servant all our woes, which he will be able to unfold to you. Please come at once, to show your love towards St. Peter, and us, his own people.

This time Charles Martel did send an embassy to Rome, and this implicit support, together with the beginnings of fever running through his troops, forced Liutprand to march back to Pavia by the end of August 739. Taking advantage of this withdrawal, Gregory agreed to support Thrasimund II's return to Spoleto. Thrasimund II forced his way back in by December 739 with Roman armed support, but refused to hand over the four captured towns he had promised in exchange for papal support. Learning that Charles Martel was sick, Liutprand once again returned to attacking the Exarchate in 740, forcing Gregory yet again to appeal to the Franks, who again refused to become involved.

== Death ==
Unsuccessful at stopping the Lombard advance, Gregory III died on 28 November 741. He was succeeded by Pope Zachary. He was buried in St. Peter's Basilica, in the oratory he had built at the start of his pontificate. Gregory's feast day is now celebrated on 10 December.

== Sources ==
- Levillain, Philippe (2002). The papacy : Gaius-Proxies. New York: Routledge. ISBN 9780415922302.
- Duffy, Eamon (2006). Saints & Sinners: A History of the Popes. New Haven, Conn.: Yale University Press. ISBN 9780300115970.
- Treadgold, Warren (1997). A History of the Byzantine State and Society. Stanford, California: Stanford University Press. ISBN 978-0804726306.
- Mann, Horace K. (1914). The Lives of the Popes in the Early Middle Ages. Vol. I: The Popes Under the Lombard Rule, Part 2, 657–795. pp. 203–224.

Catholic Church titles
Preceded by Gregory II	Pope; 731–741	Succeeded by Zachary
