= Siege of Avignon (737) =

737 battle

Coordinates: 43.9500°N 4.8167°E

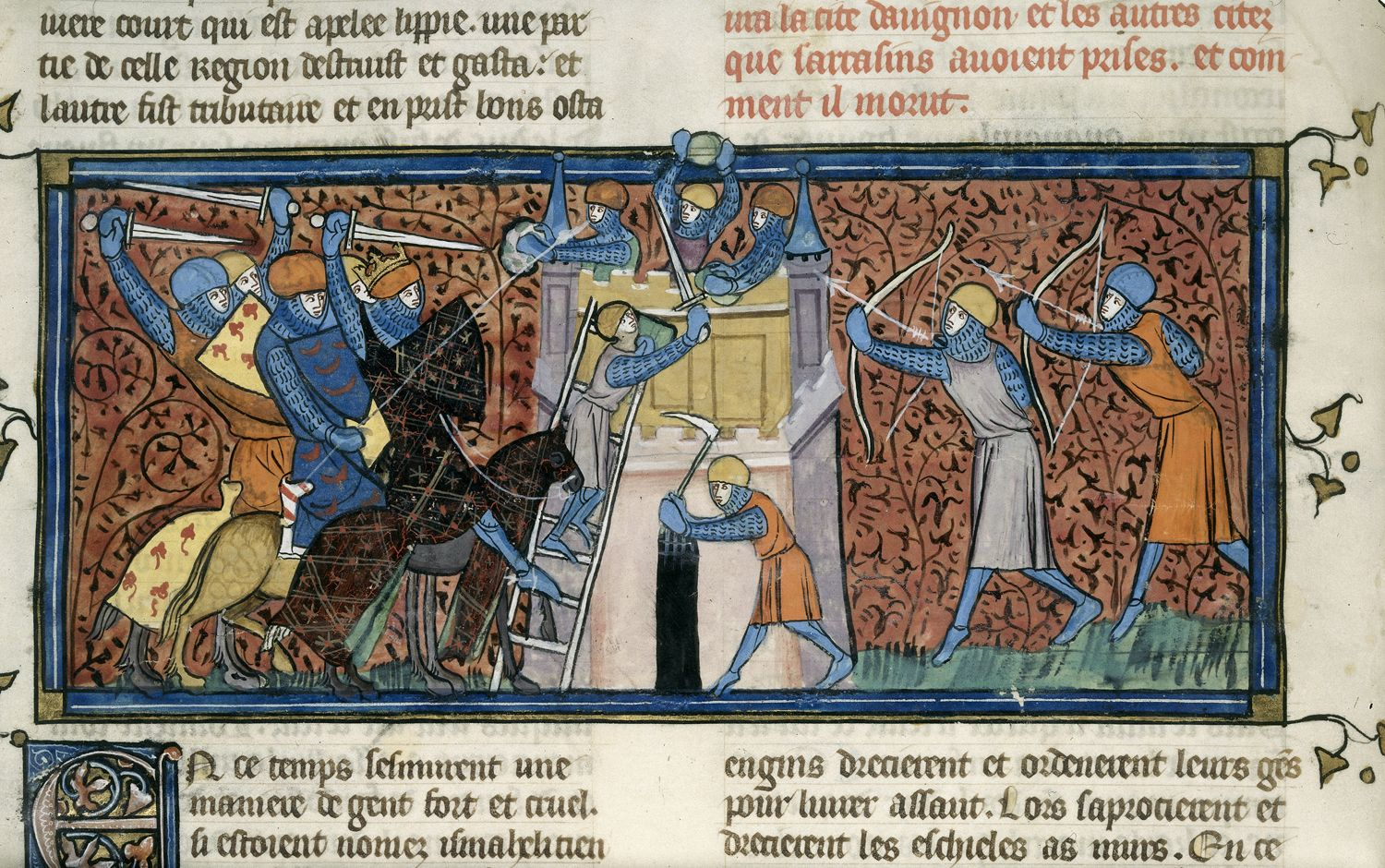
Scene from the siege of Avignon (from the Grandes Chroniques de France, 1332–1350)

The siege of Avignon was contested in 737. Frankish forces led by Charles Martel defeated the Umayyad garrison of Avignon and destroyed the stronghold.

== Contemporary view ==
Arabs had occupied the city of Avignon in 734, after it had been surrendered to Yusuf ibn 'Abd al-Rahman al-Fihri, Umayyad governor of Narbonne, by Duke Maurontus of Provence. According to the Continuations of Fredegar, Maurontus probably invited Yusuf into the city after forming an alliance with him against Martel. The Chronicle of Moissac confirms that Yusuf's forces moved peacefully from Arab-held Septimania into Provence and entered Avignon without a fight. In reaction, Martel sent his brother Duke Childebrand south in 736, accompanied by fellow dukes and counts. Childebrand laid siege to Avignon and held the field until his brother was ready to storm the city.

Martel's forces used rope ladders and battering rams to attack the walls of Avignon, which was burned to the ground following its capture. The army then crossed the Rhône River into Septimania in order to lay siege to Narbonne.

This siege was part of the campaigns of 736–737 during which Charles Martel for the second time engaged Arab armies from Al-Andalus beyond the Pyrenees. Unlike the invasion of 732–733, the Arabs came this time by sea. Notable at these battles was the use of heavy cavalry in addition to Martel's vaunted veteran Frankish infantry. Though he had some catapults, the city of Avignon was largely taken by a simple, brutal, frontal assault using rams to smash through the gates, and ladders to scale the walls.

== Modern critical viewpoints ==
Anthony Santosuosso, an expert in the Dark Ages and Medieval Europe, has argued that these events were as important macrohistorically as Martel's victory at the Battle of Tours. The campaigns, which ended with the complete destruction of a large Arab force, attempting to relieve Narbonne, at the Battle of the River Berre in 737, crushed any hope of expansion while the Umayyad Caliphate was still united, before the Battle of the Zab, at which the Umayyads were defeated by their Abbasid rivals.

In Paul Fouracre's account, however, both the extent and the importance of Martel's victories are said to have been greatly exaggerated by Paul the Deacon and the Continuations of Fredegar in which Martel came to be depicted as the progenitor of later Frankish success and the Franks as "God's people". Other historians point to Charles' interests in the region, who in 736 had just occupied the Lyonnais and the Middle Rhone, and may have seen his newly conquered Burgundy in danger. At any rate, it seems apparent that the local magnates of Provence, ruling semi-autonomously, saw the impending danger coming from the north, and may have in turn called in the Muslim forces from bordering Septimania.
