= Lost city =

Human settlement that has become uninhabited and largely forgotten by history

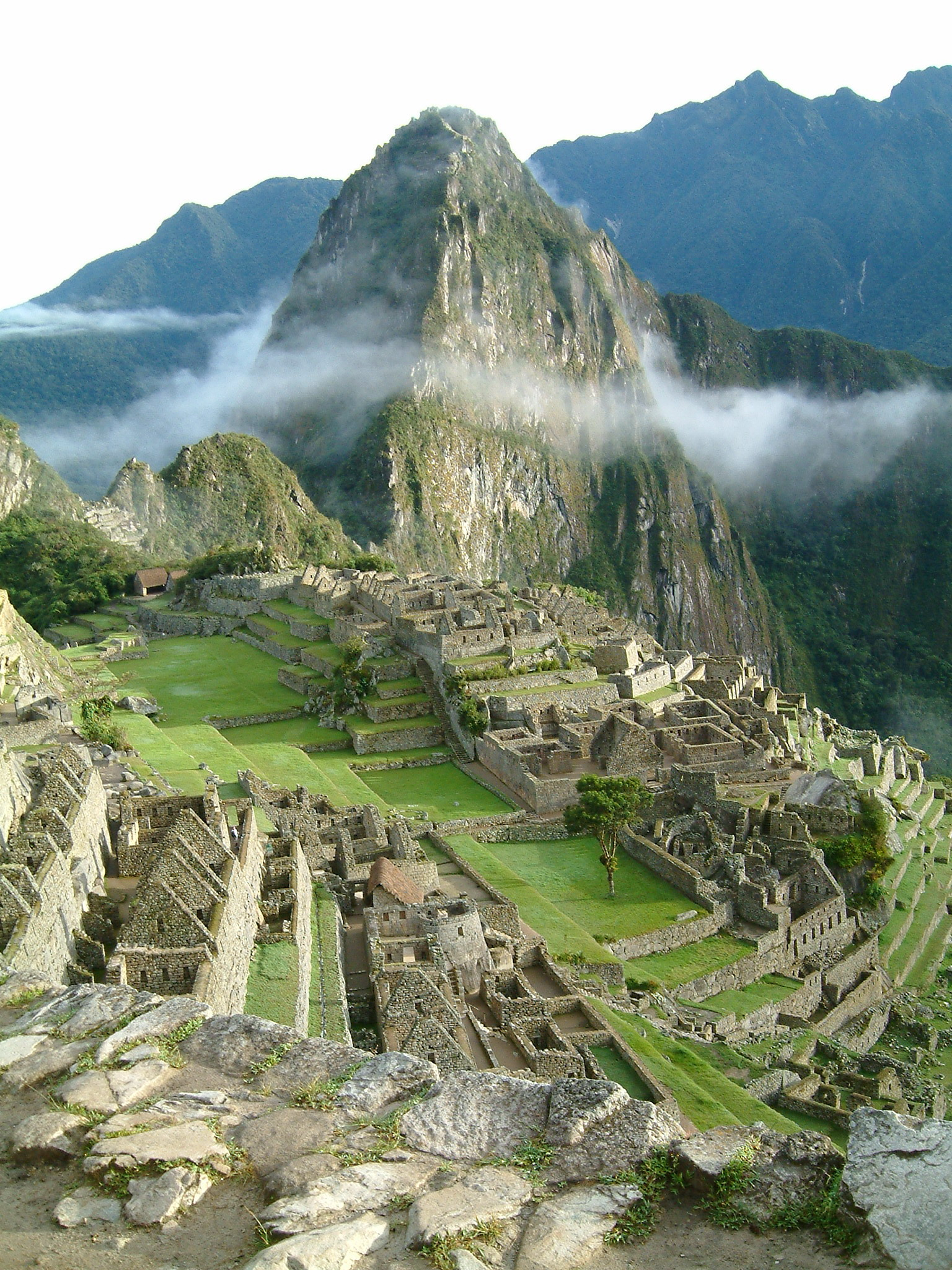
Agustín Lizárraga rediscovered the ruins of Machu Picchu in 1902.

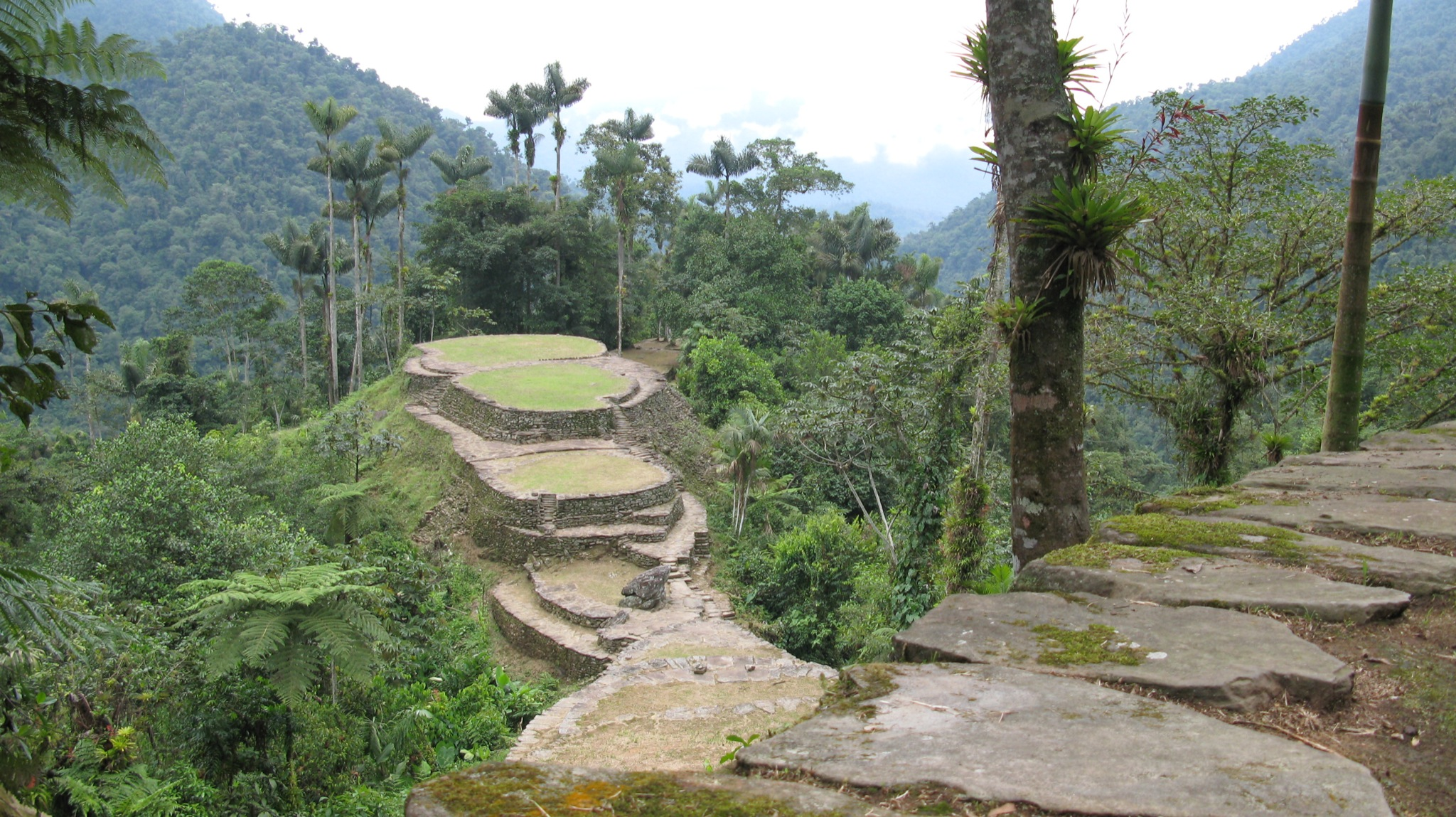
Ruins of Ciudad Perdida, a city built by the Tayrona in the Sierra Nevada de Santa Marta, Colombia

A lost city is an urban settlement that fell into terminal decline and became extensively or completely uninhabited, with the consequence that the site's former significance was no longer known to the wider world. The locations of many lost cities have been forgotten, but some have been rediscovered and studied extensively by scientists. Recently abandoned cities or cities whose location was never in question might be referred to as ruins or ghost towns. Smaller settlements may be referred to as abandoned villages. The search for such lost cities by European explorers and adventurers in Africa, the Americas, and Southeast Asia from the 15th century onward eventually contributed to the development of archaeology.

Lost cities generally fall into two broad categories: those where all knowledge of the city's existence was forgotten before it was rediscovered, and those whose memory was preserved in myth, legend, or historical records but whose location was lost or at least no longer widely recognized.

== Reasons for loss ==
Cities may become lost for a variety of reasons including natural disasters, economic or social upheaval, or war.

The Incan capital city of Vilcabamba was destroyed and depopulated during the Spanish conquest of Peru in 1572. The Spanish did not rebuild the city, and the location went unrecorded and was forgotten until it was rediscovered through a detailed examination of period letters and documents.

Troy was a city located in northwest Anatolia in what is now Turkey. It is best known for being the focus of the Trojan War described in the Greek Epic Cycle and especially in the Iliad, one of the two epic poems attributed to Homer. Repeatedly destroyed and rebuilt, the city slowly declined and was abandoned in the Byzantine era. Buried by time, the city was consigned to the realm of legend until the location was first excavated in the 1860s.

Other settlements are lost with few or no clues to their abandonment. For example, Malden Island, in the central Pacific, was deserted when first visited by Europeans in 1825, but the remains of temples and other structures on the island indicate that a population of Polynesians had lived there for perhaps several generations in the past. Typically this lack of information is due to no surviving written or oral histories and a lack of archaeological data as in the case of the remote and fairly unknown Malden Island.

== Rediscovery ==
With the development of archaeology and the application of modern techniques, many previously lost cities have been rediscovered.

Machu Picchu is a pre-Columbian Inca site situated on a mountain ridge above the Urubamba Valley in Peru. Often referred to as the "Lost City of the Incas", it is perhaps the most familiar icon of the Inca World. Machu Picchu was built around 1450, at the height of the Inca Empire. It was abandoned just over 100 years later, in 1572, as a belated result of the Spanish Conquest. It is possible that most of its inhabitants died from smallpox introduced by travelers before the Spanish conquistadors arrived in the area. In 1911, Melchor Arteaga led the explorer Hiram Bingham to Machu Picchu, which had been largely forgotten by everybody except the small number of people living in the immediate valley. Nevertheless, Peruvian explorer and farmer Agustín Lizárraga predated this discovery by 9 years, having found the Inca site on 14 July 1902. He left a charcoal inscription bearing the words "A. Lizárraga 1902".

Helike was an ancient Greek city that sank at night in the winter of 373 BCE. The city was located in Achaea, Northern Peloponnesos, two kilometres (12 stadia) from the Corinthian Gulf. The city was thought to be legend until 2001, when it was rediscovered in the Helike Delta. In 1988, the Greek archaeologist Dora Katsonopoulou launched the Helike Project to locate the site of the lost city. In 1994, in collaboration with the University of Patras, a magnetometer survey was carried out in the midplain of the delta, which revealed the outlines of a buried building. In 1995, this target was excavated (now known as the Klonis site), and a large Roman building with standing walls was brought to light.

== Lost cities by continent ==
=== Africa ===
==== Rediscovered ====
===== Egypt =====
- Akhetaten – capital during the reign of 18th Dynasty pharaoh Akhenaten. Later abandoned, almost totally destroyed. Modern day Amarna.
- Avaris – capital city of the Hyksos in the Nile Delta.
- Canopus – located on the now-dry Canopic branch of the Nile, east of Alexandria.
- Memphis – administrative capital of ancient Egypt. Little remains. Now a UNESCO World Heritage Site.
- Pi-Ramesses – imperial city of Rameses the Great, now thought to exist beneath Qantir
- Tanis – capital during the 21st and 22nd Dynasties, in the Delta region.

===== Maghreb =====
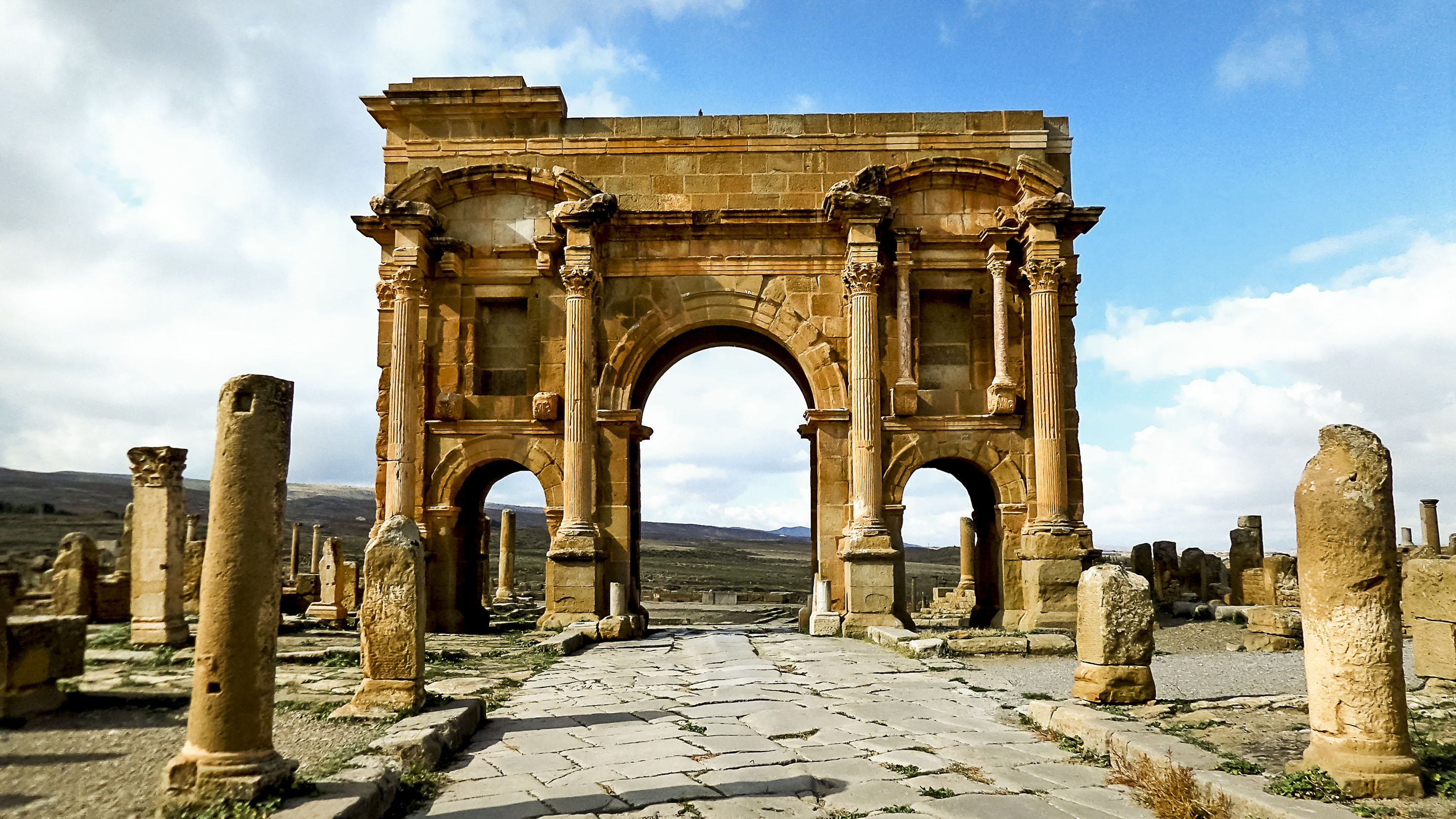
The Roman ruins of Timgad

- Carthage – initially a Phoenician city in Tunisia, destroyed and then rebuilt by Rome. Later served as the capital of the Vandal Kingdom of North Africa, before being destroyed by the Arabs after its capture in 697 CE. Now a UNESCO World Heritage Site.
- Dougga, Tunisia – Roman city located in present-day Tunisia. Now a UNESCO World Heritage Site.
- Leptis Magna – Roman city located in present-day Libya. It was the birthplace of Emperor Septimius Severus, who lavished an extensive public works program on the city, including diverting the course of a nearby river. The river later returned to its original course, burying much of the city in silt and sand. Now a UNESCO World Heritage Site.
- Timgad, Algeria – Roman city founded by the emperor Trajan around 100 CE, covered by sand in the 7th century. Now a UNESCO World Heritage Site.
- Aoudaghost, Mauritania – wealthy Berber city in medieval Ghana.

===== Horn of Africa =====
- Adulis, Eritrea – a port city of the Aksumite kingdom built between 500 and 300 BC.
- Qohaito, Eritrea – 1000 BC city of the Kingdom of Axum.
- Metera, Eritrea – 800 BC lost town.
- Keskese, Eritrea – 700 BC lost city.
- Hubat, Ethiopia – capital of Harla Kingdom

===== Subsaharan Africa =====
- Great Zimbabwe – built between the 11th and the 14th century, this city is the namesake of modern-day Zimbabwe. Now a UNESCO World Heritage Site.
- Niani, Guinea – lost capital of the Mali Empire
- Gede, Kenya – also known as Gedi. Now a UNESCO World Heritage Site.

==== Uncertain or disputed ====
- Lost City of the Kalahari – possibly invented

==== Undiscovered ====
- Itjtawy, Egypt – capital during the 12th Dynasty. Exact location still unknown, but it is believed to lie near the modern town of el-Lisht.
- Thinis, Egypt – undiscovered city and centre of the Thinite Confederacy, the leader of which, Menes, united Upper and Lower Egypt and was the first pharaoh.
- Kubar, Ethiopia – a lost major city of the Kingdom of Aksum
- Dakkar, Ethiopia – capital of the Adal Sultanate

=== Asia ===
==== Central Asia ====
===== Rediscovered =====
- Ai-Khanoum – site of a Hellenistic city in Afghanistan, probably a military and economic center.
- Karakorum – capital of the Mongol Empire under Genghis Khan.
- Khara-Khoto – Western Xia centre of trade located in Inner Mongolia, mentioned in The Travels of Marco Polo as Etzina.
- Loulan – located in the Taklamakan Desert, on the ancient Silk Road route.
- Mangazeya, Siberia – a trade colony and eventual city, from the 17th century.
- Niya – located in the Taklamakan Desert, on the ancient Silk Road route.
- Old Urgench – capital of Khwarezm. Now a UNESCO World Heritage Site.
- Otrar – city located along the Silk Road, important in the history of Central Asia.
- Poykent – also known as Paykend, a city in modern Uzbekistan located on the Oasis of Bukhara.
- Subashi – located in the Taklamakan Desert, on the ancient Silk Road route.

===== Undiscovered =====
- Abaskun – medieval Caspian Sea trading port
- Alexandria in Margiana – historical region centered on the oasis of Merv, and a minor satrapy within the Achaemenid Empire

==== East Asia ====
===== Rediscovered =====
- Shimao site – Large stone settlements in Neolithic China.
- Yinxu – The capitals of Shang dynasty.
- Xanadu – Important cities of the Yuan dynasty, now a UNESCO World Heritage Site.

==== Undiscovered ====
- Wanggeom-seong – historic capital of Gojoseon, the first kingdom of Korea, supposedly founded by the legendary king Dangun.

==== South Asia ====
===== India =====
====== Rediscovered ======
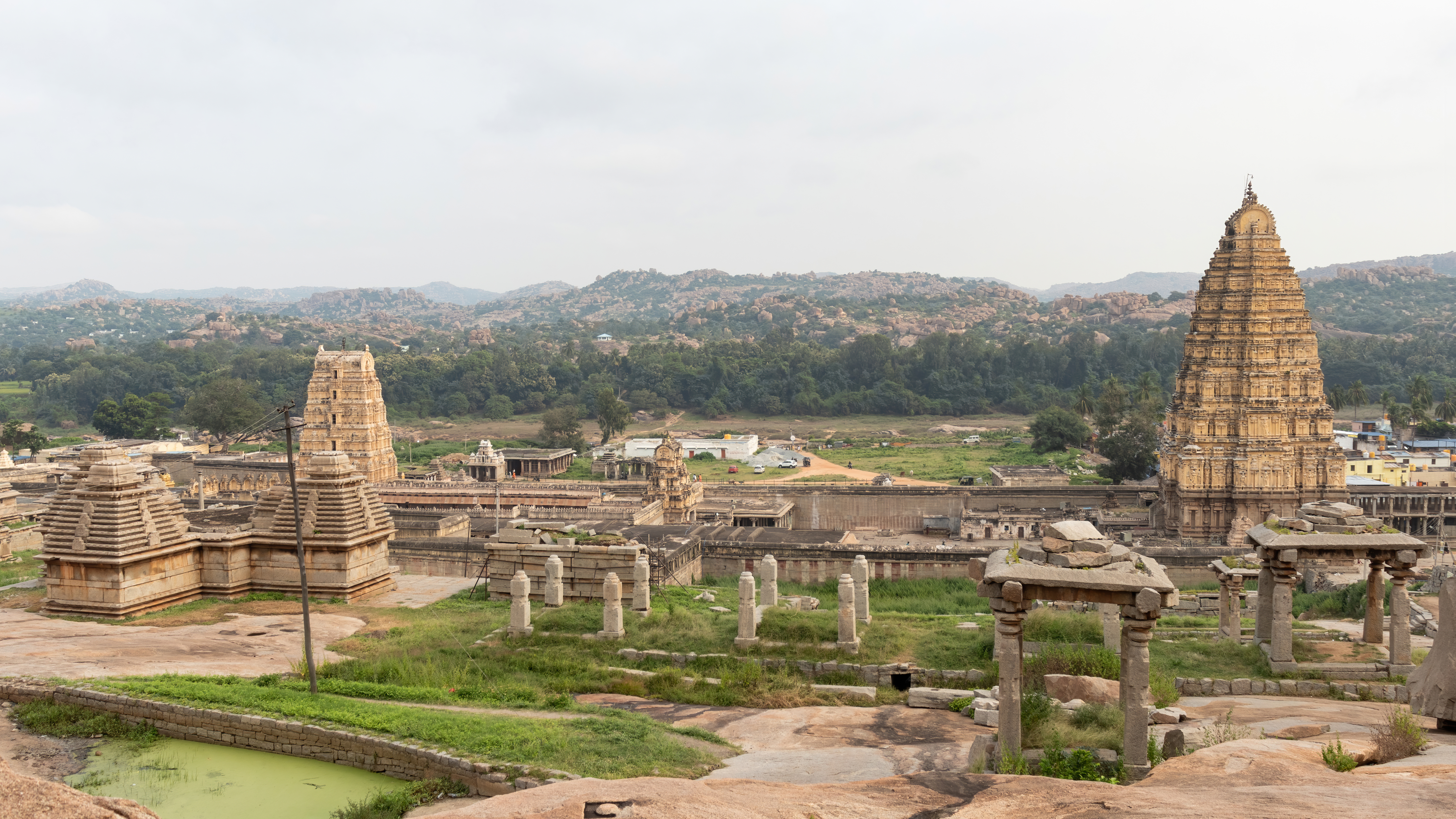
The ruins of Vijayanagara were brought to light in the early 19th century by Colin Mackenzie.

- Dholavira – located in Gujarat. City of the Indus Valley civilization.
- Dvārakā – ancient city of Krishna, hero of the Mahabharata. Now largely excavated. Off the coast of the Indian state of Gujarat.
- Kalibangan – located in Rajasthan, India – early city of the Indus Valley Civilization.
- Lothal – located in Gujarat, India – early city of the Indus Valley Civilization.
- Pattadakal – located in Karnataka, India. Now a UNESCO World Heritage Site.
- Puhar, Mayiladuthurai – located in Tamil Nadu, India.
- Rakhigarhi – located in Haryana, largest Indus Valley Civilization site, dating back to 4600 BCE.
- Surkotada – located in Gujarat, India – early city of the Indus Valley Civilization.
- Vasai – located in India, former capital (1533–1740) of the Northern Provinces of Portuguese India
- Vijayanagara – located in Karnataka, India. Now a UNESCO World Heritage Site.

====== Undiscovered ======
- Muziris – located near Cranganore, Kerala, southern India

===== Nepal =====
- Lumbini – located in Rupandehi district, birthplace of Gautam Buddha. Now a UNESCO World Heritage Site.
- Sinja Valley – located in Jumla district, capital city of medieval Khasa Kingdom and origin of Khas (Nepali) language. Now a UNESCO World Heritage Site.

===== Pakistan =====
====== Rediscovered ======
- Chanhudaro – located in Pakistan's Sindh province, an Indus Valley civilization city
- Ganweriwal – located in the Cholistan Desert of Punjab, Pakistan – was a large town of the Indus Valley Civilization, not yet excavated.
- Harappa – located in Punjab, Pakistan – early city of the Indus Valley Civilization
- Kot Diji – located in Pakistan's Sindh province Indus Valley civilization city
- Mehrgarh – located in Pakistan's Balochistan province Indus Valley civilization city
- Mohenjo-daro – located in Sindh, Pakistan — early city of the Indus Valley civilization. The city was one of the early urban settlements in the world.
- Seri Bahlol – located in Khyber Pakhtunkhwa province — an ancient town, now the site of ruins.
- Sokhta Koh – located near the city of Pasni — another ancient settlement of the Indus Valley.
- Sutkagan Dor – located near the Dasht River — was a small settlement in the Indus Valley, now in ruins.
- Takht-i-Bahi – located in Khyber Pakhtunkhwa province — an ancient Indo-Parthian Buddhist monastery site.
- Taxila – located in Pakistan's Punjab province.

====== Undiscovered ======
- Naga Puram – located in Pakistan's Sindh province, a city of the Indus Valley civilization. The city was on the banks of the Ghaghara River.

===== Sri Lanka =====
====== Rediscovered ======
- Anuradhapura – now a UNESCO World Heritage Site.
- Sigiriya – now a UNESCO World Heritage Site.
- Polonnaruwa – now a UNESCO World Heritage Site.

==== Southeast Asia ====
===== Rediscovered =====
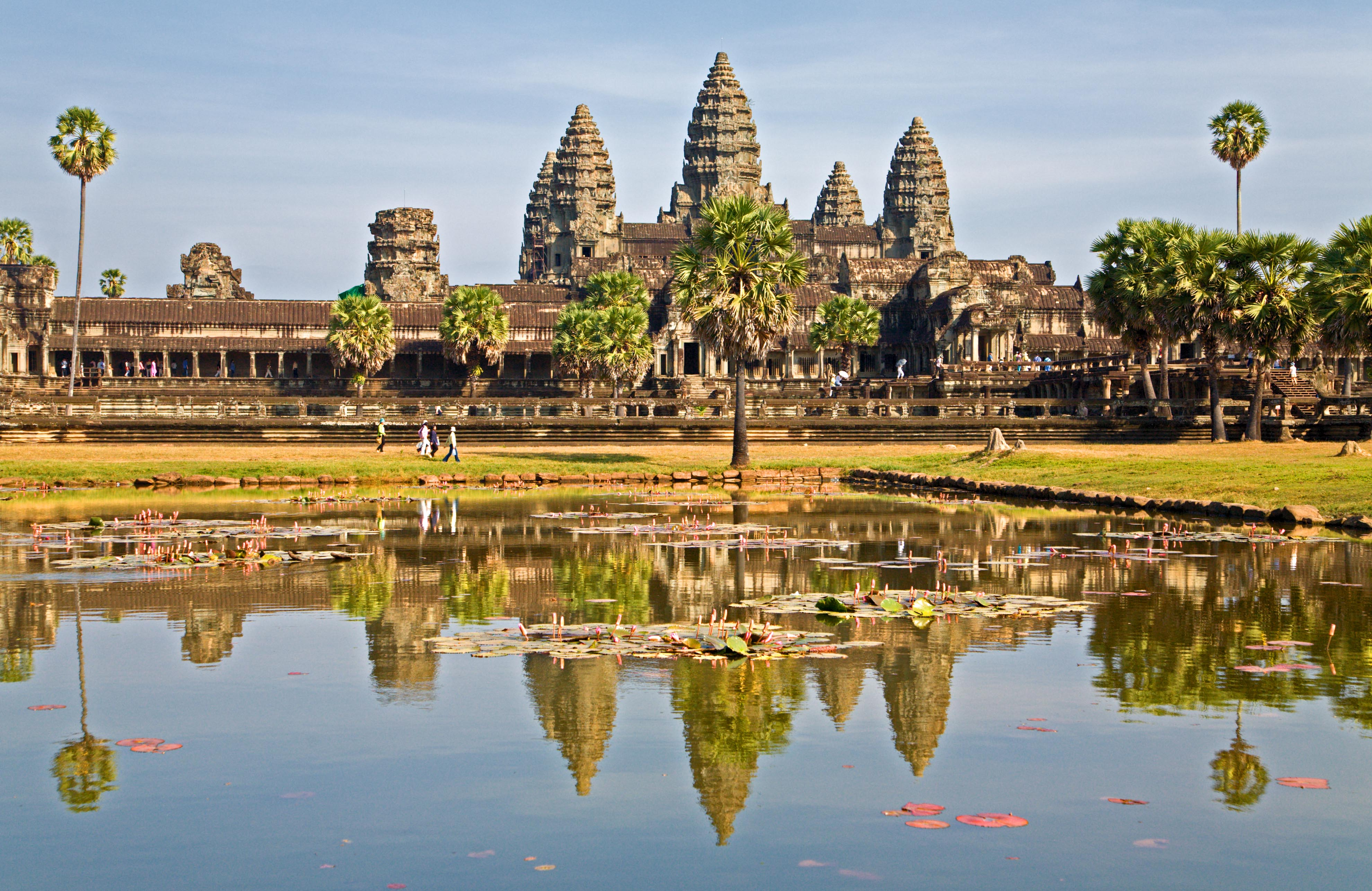
Angkor was rediscovered by Henri Mouhot in 1860.

- Angkor, Cambodia – now a UNESCO World Heritage Site.
- Ayutthaya, Thailand – now a UNESCO World Heritage Site.
- Mahendraparvata, Cambodia
- Sukhothai, Thailand – now a UNESCO World Heritage Site.
- Wilwatikta, Indonesia – capital city of Majapahit Kingdom, now in Trowulan, Mojokerto, East Java, Indonesia.

===== Undiscovered =====
- Gangga Negara, Malaysia

===== Uncertain or disputed =====
- Kota Gelanggi, Malaysia
- Ma-i, Philippines – was a sovereign polity that pre-dated the Hispanic establishment of the Philippines and notable for having established trade relations with the Kingdom of Brunei, and with Song and Ming dynasty China. Its existence was recorded both in the Chinese Imperial annals Zhu Fan Zhi (諸番志) and History of Song.

==== Western Asia ====
===== Rediscovered =====
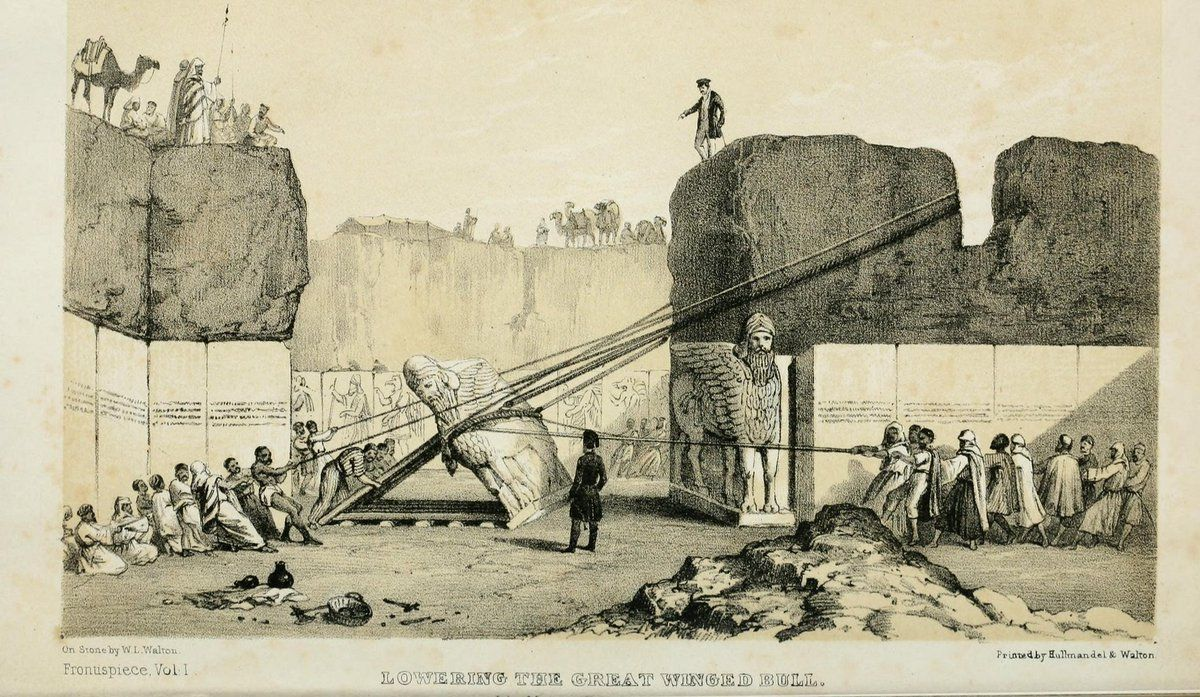
1849 illustration by Austen Henry Layard of excavations at Nineveh

- Ani – medieval Armenian capital, located on the Turkish side of the Armenia–Turkey border.
- Antioch – ancient Greek city, important stronghold in the time of the Crusades.
- Babylon – Ancient Mesopotamian capital.
- Caesarea
- Çatalhöyük – a Neolithic and Chalcolithic settlement, located near the modern city of Konya, Turkey.
- Choqa Zanbil
- Ctesiphon – Capital of the Parthian and Sassanid Empires in Iran.
- Göbekli Tepe – 12,000 years old Paleolithic settlement. It was likely not a city, but rather a temple complex.
- Hattusa – capital of the Hittite Empire. Located near the modern village of Boğazköy in north-central Turkey.
- Karahan Tepe – Paleolithic settlement built by the same culture as Göbekli Tepe.
- Kourion, Cyprus
- Kish – the Sumerian king list states that Kish was the first city to have kings following the deluge.
- Lagash – Sumerian city.
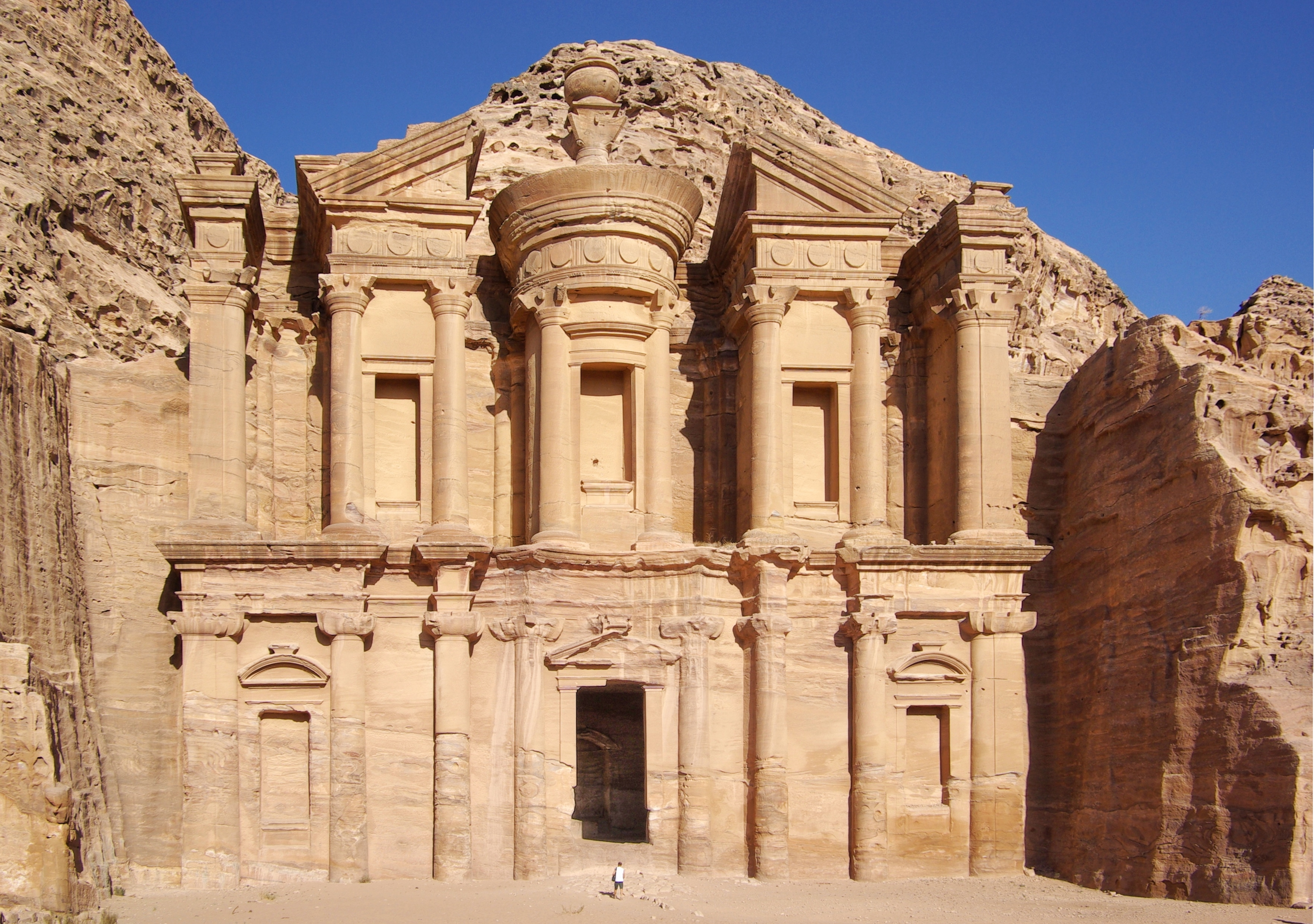
  Petra was rediscovered by Johann Ludwig Burckhardt in 1812
- Mada'in Saleh (and capital Petra) – now a UNESCO World Heritage Site.
- New Sarai – capital of the Golden Horde
- Nineveh – Second Capital of the Neo-Assyrian Empire.
- Persepolis – Ceremonial Complex built by Achaemenid kings.
- Samaria
- Tmutarakan
- Troy – Bronze Age anatolian city made famous by Homer's Iliad.
- Ur – Sumerian city.

===== Undiscovered =====
- Akkad
- Arimathea
- Balanjar – second Khazar capital
- Ekallatum
- Khazaran
- Kussara
- Samandar
- Turquoise Mountain (Firozkoh) – summer capital of the Ghurid dynasty of Afghanistan, destroyed 1223
- Washukanni – capital of the Hurrian kingdom of Mitanni

====== Uncertain or disputed ======
- Atil – final capital of the Khazar Khagnate, located in the vicinity of Samosdelka, Russia.
- Iram of the Pillars
- Irisaĝrig – Southern Iraq, near the town of Afak
- Nuribta – Hebrew: נרבתא. Jewish city in The Great Revolt.
- Old Sarai – capital of the Golden Horde, its status as a separated city from New Sarai is still disputed.
- Saqsin

=== Europe ===
==== Austria ====
- Noreia – the capital of the ancient Celtic kingdom of Noricum. Possibly in southern Austria or Slovenia.

==== Bosnia and Herzegovina ====
- Daorson – the capital of ancient Illyrian community in present-day Bosnia and Herzegovina.

==== Bulgaria ====
- Perperikon – the megalith complex had been laid in ruins and re-erected many times in history – from the Bronze Age until Middle Ages.
- Seuthopolis – an ancient Thracian city, discovered and excavated in 1948. It was founded by king Seuthes III around 325 BC. Its ruins are now located at the bottom of the Koprinka Reservoir near the city of Kazanlak.

==== Croatia ====
- Heraclea somewhere in the Adriatic on the Croatian coast. Exact location unknown.

==== Czech Republic ====
- Veligrad - The capital of Great Moravia. There is a possible archeological site near Staré Město or Mikulčice-Valy.
- Wogastisburg - Battlefield mentioned in Chronicle of Fredegar, where united Slavic tribes, led by Sámo,defeated the Franks led by Dagobert I. Location is unknown.
- City of Vistrach - 9th century Slavic settlement ruled by Slavic duke Vistrach, mentioned in Annales Fuldenses. Possibly Zábrušany hillfort near Teplitz.
- Canburg - 9th century Bohemian city, unsuccessfully besieged by Charles the Younger, mentioned in Moissac Chronicle. Its location is still disputed, although it has been identified with the city of Kadaň.

==== Denmark ====
- Høgekøbing
- Ræveleje
- Serridslev
- Sønderside

==== Finland ====
- Teljä

==== France ====
- Quentovic – In 842, the ancient port of Quentovicus was destroyed by a Viking fleet.
- Thérouanne – In 1553, the city was razed, the roads broken up and the fields ploughed and salted by command of Charles V.

==== Germany ====
- Damasia – An ancient hill-top settlement on the Lech, of the Licates, a tribe of the Celtic Vindelici. Commonly identified with either the Auerberg or pre-Roman Augsburg. According to folklore, sunken into the Ammersee.
- Hedeby
- Rungholt – Wadden Sea in Germany, sunk during the "Grote Mandrenke", a storm surge in the North Sea on 16 January 1362
- Niedam – near Rungholt
- Vineta

==== Greece ====
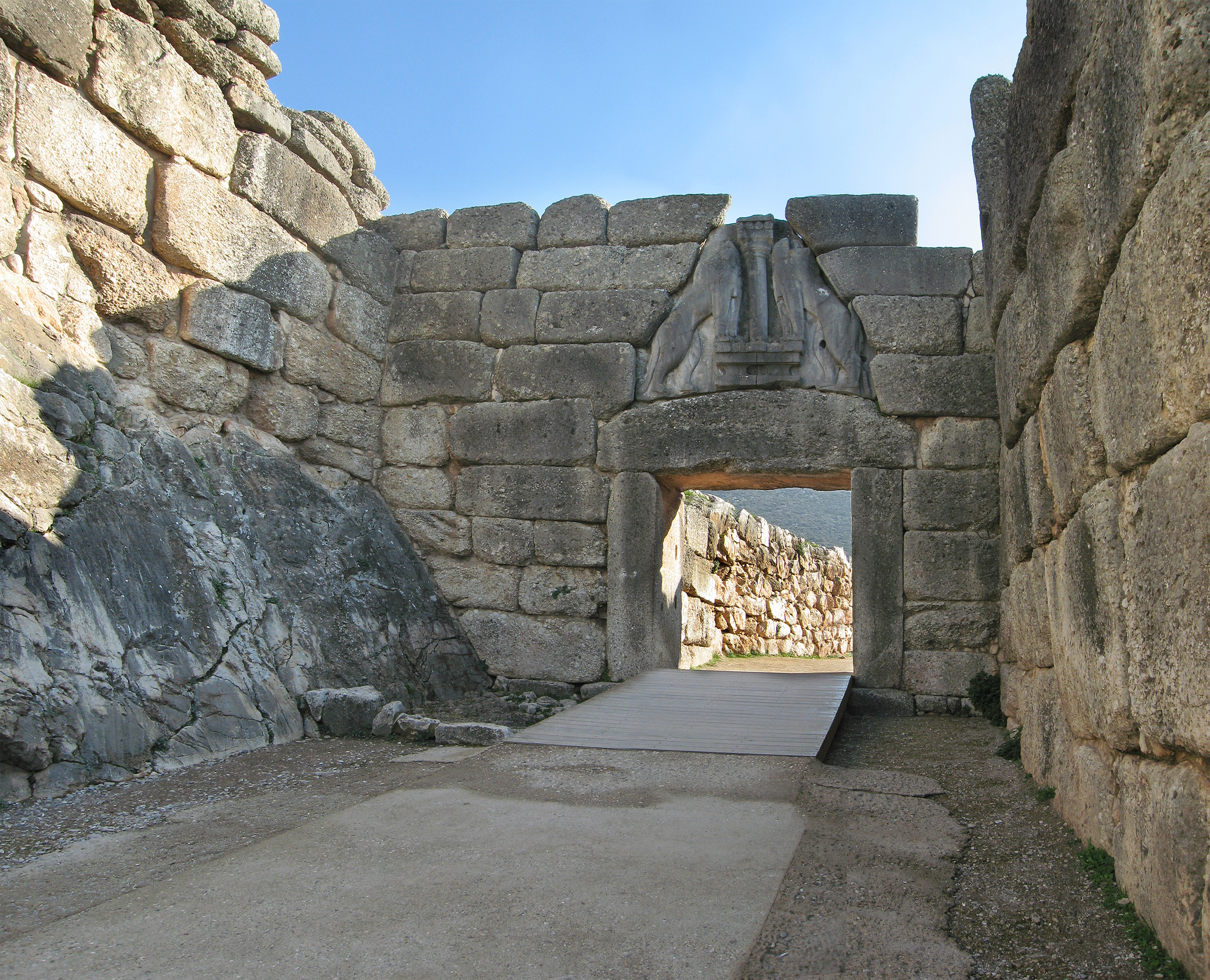
Heinrich Schliemann began excavations at Mycenae in 1874

- Akrotiri – on the island of Thera, Greece.
- Chryse Island – in the Aegean, reputed site of an ancient temple still visible on the sea floor.
- Helike – sunk by an earthquake in the 4th century BC and rediscovered in the 1990s.
- Mycenae
- Pavlopetri – underwater off the coast of southern Laconia in Peloponnese, is about 5,000 years old, and is the oldest submerged archaeological town site.

==== Hungary ====
- Avar Ring – central stronghold of the Avars, it is believed to have been in the wide plain between the Danube and the Tisza.

==== Iceland ====
- Gunnbjörn's skerries - a group of islands between Iceland and Greenland that were briefly settled before being destroyed in a volcanic eruption.

==== Italy ====
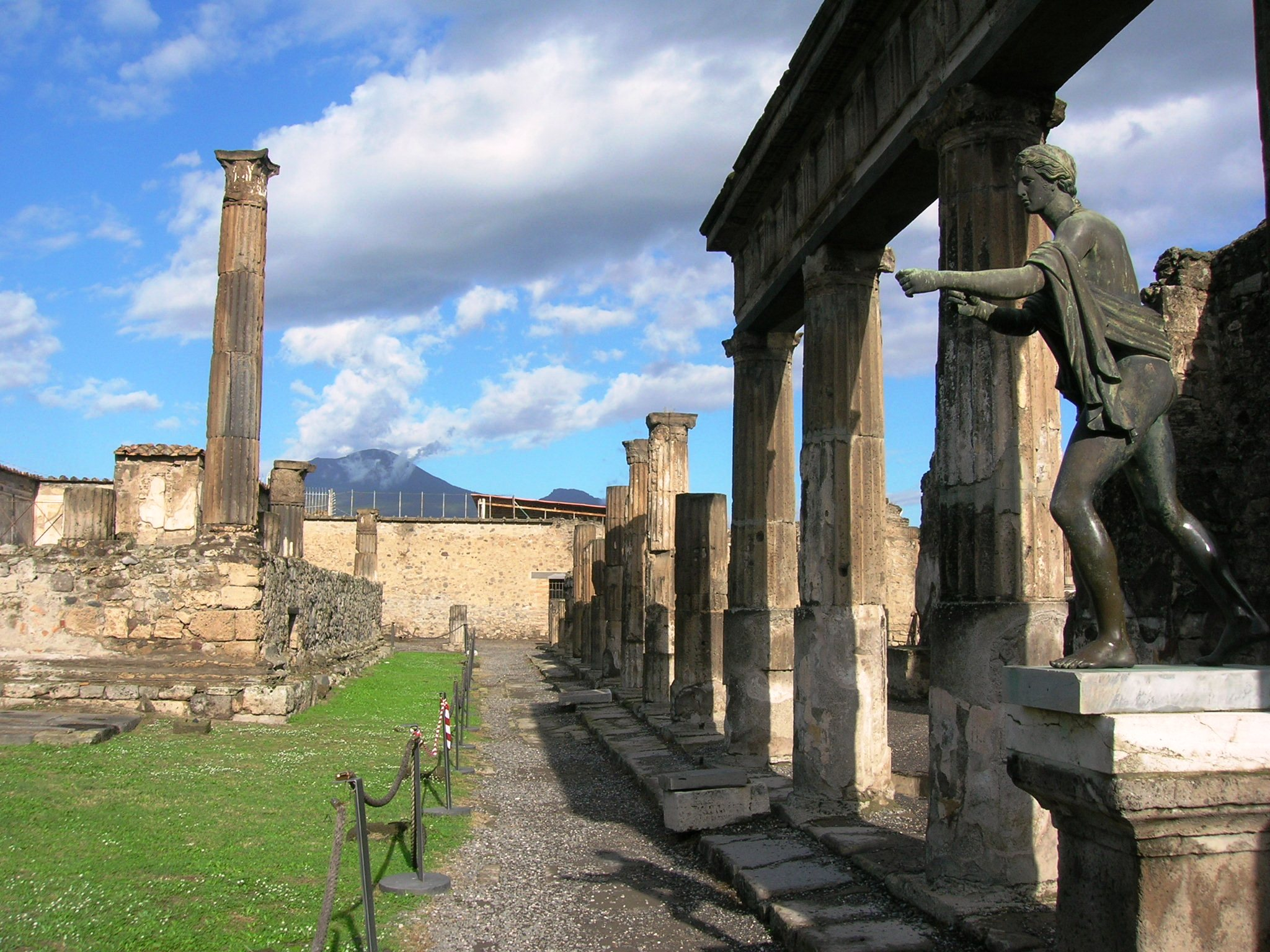
The Temple of Apollo in Pompeii

- Acerrae Vatriae – a town of the Sarranates mentioned by Pliny the Elder as having been situated in an unknown location in Umbria.
- Castro – a city in Lazio, capital of a Duchy ruled by the Farnese family. It was destroyed by a Papal army in 1649.
- Luni
- Paestum – Greek and Roman city south of Naples; three famous Greek temples.
- Pompeii, Herculaneum, and Stabiae – all buried during the eruption of Vesuvius in 79 AD and rediscovered in the 18th century.
- Sybaris, Italy – ancient Greek colonial city of unsurpassed wealth utterly destroyed by its arch-rival Crotona in 510 BC.
- Tripergole – ancient Roman spa village on the eastern shores of the Lucrine Lake in the Campi Flegrei. The village and most of the lake were buried by tephra in 1538 during the volcanic eruption that created Monte Nuovo. The exact location of the village and its associated hot springs can no longer be identified.

==== Lithuania ====
- Apuolė

==== Netherlands ====
- Brittenburg – ancient Roman settlement
- Dorestad
- Reimerswaal – flooded in the 16th century.
- Saeftinghe – prosperous city lost to the sea in 1584.

==== Norway ====
- Kaupang – In Viksfjord near Larvik, Norway. Largest trading city around the Oslo Fjord during the Viking age. As sea levels retreated (the shoreline is 7m lower today than in 1000) the city was no longer accessible from the ocean and was abandoned.

==== Poland ====
- Biskupin
- Truso
- Jomsborg

==== Portugal ====
- Ammaia - Roman villa Abandoned between the 5th and the 9th century AD.
- Conímbriga – early trading post dating to the 9th century BC. Abandoned in the 8th century AD.

==== Romania ====
- Sarmisegetuza Regia – the old capital of the Ancient Dacian Kingdom.
- Vicina – a port on the Danube, near the Delta.
- Orașul de Floci – a former trading town on the Danube.

==== Russia ====
- Bolghar – important Silk Road city on the Volga river, razed by the Tatar.
- Ilimsk – a small town in Siberia. Flooded by the Ust-Ilimsk Reservoir in the mid-1970s.
- Kitezh – mythical city beneath the waters in central Russia.
- Mangazeya – a trading colony on the Pomors' Northern Sea Route, was abandoned in the 17th century after the Northern Sea Route was banned. Mangazeya was considered lost until it was re-discovered by archaeologists in 1967.
- Peremyshl – town that was founded in 1152.
- Tmutarakan – a trading town of Rus' Khaganate

==== Serbia ====
- Stari Ras – one of the first capitals of the medieval Serbian state of Raška, abandoned in the 13th century.

==== Slovakia ====
- Myšia Hôrka (near Spišský Štvrtok) – 3500 years old town (rediscovered in the 20th century) and archaeological site.

==== Spain ====
- Amaya – either the capital or one of the most important cities of the Cantabri. Probably located in what nowadays is called "Amaya Peak" in Burgos, northern Spain.
- Cypsela – drowned Ibero-Greek settlement in the Catalan shore, Spain. Mentioned by Greek, Roman and Medieval chroniclers.
- Reccopolis – one of the capital cities founded in Hispania by the Visigoths. The site was incrementally abandoned in the 10th century.
- Tartessos – a harbor city or an economical complex of small harbors and trade routes set on the mouth of the Guadalquivir river, in modern Andalusia, Spain. Tartessos is believed to be either the seat of an independent kingdom or a community of palatial cities devoted to exporting the mineral resources of the Hispanic mainland to the sea, to meet the Phoenician and Greek traders. Its destruction is still a matter of debate among historians, and one modern tendency tends to believe that Tartessos was never a city, but a culture complex.

==== Sweden ====
- Birka
- Ny Varberg
- Uppåkra

==== United Kingdom ====
- Calleva Atrebatum, Silchester, England – large Romano-British walled city 10 miles (16 km) south of present-day Reading, Berkshire. Just the walls remain and a street pattern can be discerned from the air.
- Evonium, Scotland – purported coronation site and capital of 40 kings
- Skara Brae, Orkney, Scotland – Neolithic settlement buried under sediment. Uncovered by a winter storm in 1850.

==== Ukraine ====
- Árheimar – a capital of the Goths, that was located near the Dnieper river
- Bolokhiv – abandoned in the 13th century.
- Talianki – the largest known settlement in Neolithic Europe.

=== North America ===
==== Canada ====
===== Rediscovered =====
- L'Anse aux Meadows – Viking settlement founded in 1021 AD. Now a UNESCO World Heritage Site.
- Lost Villages – The Lost Villages are ten communities (Aultsville, Dickinson's Landing, Farran's Point, Maple Grove, Mille Roches, Moulinette, Santa Cruz, Sheek's Island, Wales, Woodlands) in the Canadian province of Ontario, in the former townships of Cornwall and Osnabruck (now South Stormont) near Cornwall, which were permanently submerged by the creation of the St. Lawrence Seaway in 1958.

===== Undiscovered =====
- Hóp - A possible Viking settlement south of Staumsfjord in Vinland alluded to in the Saga of the Greenlanders.

==== Caribbean ====
===== Rediscovered =====
- Port Royal, Jamaica – Destroyed by the 1692 Jamaica earthquake.

==== Mexico and Central America ====
===== Maya cities =====
Incomplete list – for further information, see Maya civilization

====== Rediscovered ======
The Temple of Kukulcán (El Castillo) in Chichen Itza

- Calakmul – One of two superpowers in the classic Maya period. Now a UNESCO World Heritage Site.
- Chichen Itza – This ancient place of pilgrimage is still the most visited Maya ruin. Now a UNESCO World Heritage Site.
- Coba
- Copán – In modern Honduras. Now a UNESCO World Heritage Site.
- Naachtun – Rediscovered in 1922, it remains one of the most remote and least visited Maya sites. Located 44 km (27 miles) south-south-east of Calakmul, and 65 km (40 miles) north of Tikal, it is believed to have had strategic importance to, and been vulnerable to military attacks by, both neighbours. Its ancient name was identified in the mid-1990s as Masuul.
- Palenque – in the Mexican state of Chiapas, known for its beautiful art and architecture. Now a UNESCO World Heritage Site.
- Tikal – One of two major powers in the classic Maya period. Now a UNESCO World Heritage Site.
- Tulum – Mayan coastal city.

===== Olmec cities =====
====== Rediscovered ======
- La Venta – In the present day Mexican state of Tabasco.
- San Lorenzo Tenochtitlán – In the present day Mexican state of Veracruz.

===== Totonac Cities =====
====== Rediscovered ======
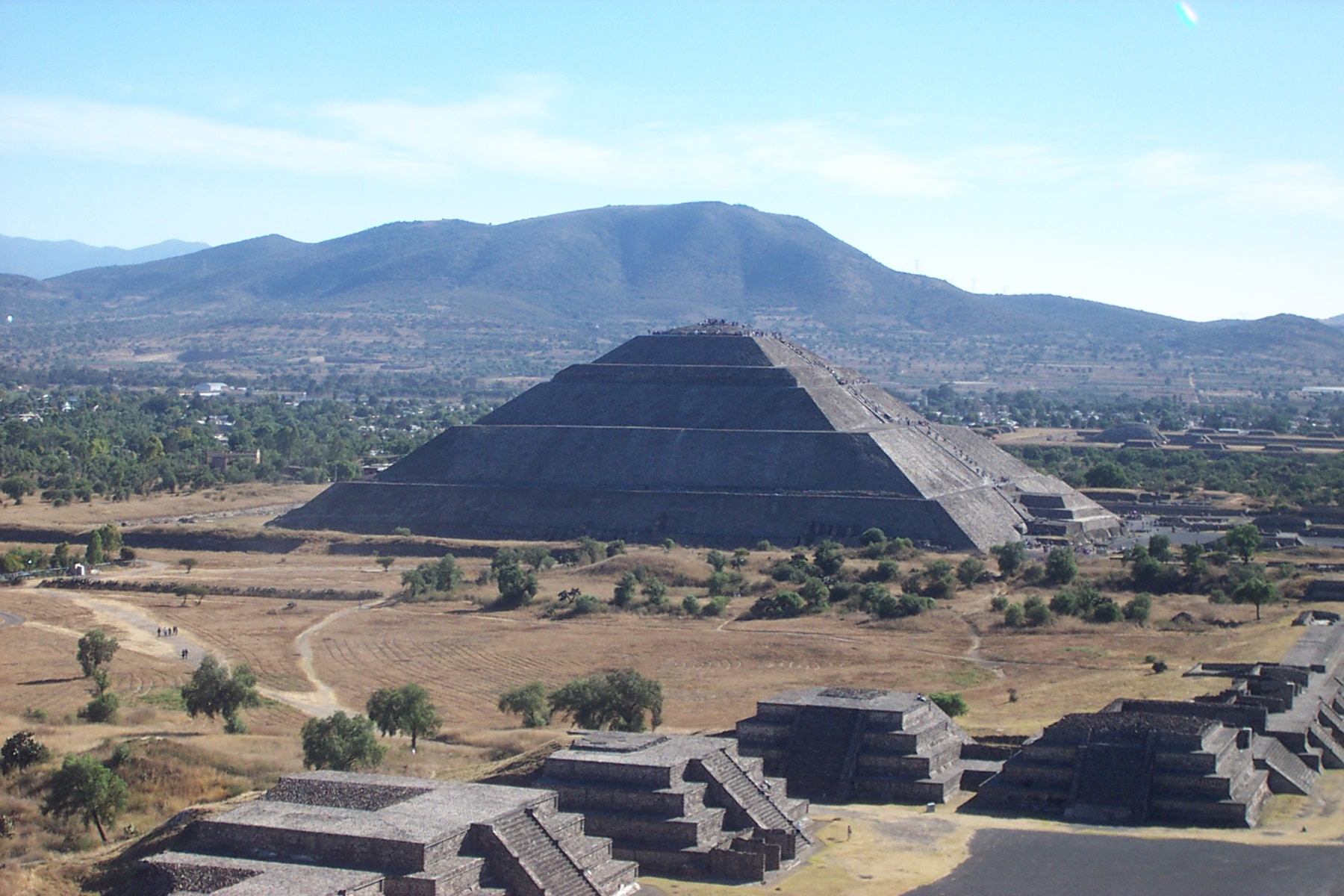
Major excavations at Teotihuacan began in the early 20th century

- Teotihuacan – Pre-Aztec Mexico. Now a UNESCO World Heritage Site.

===== Other =====
====== Rediscovered ======
- Izapa – Chief city of the Izapa civilization, whose territory extended from the Gulf Coast across to the Pacific Coast of Chiapas, in present-day Mexico, and Guatemala.
- Guayabo – In Costa Rica. It is believed that the site was inhabited from 1500 BCE to 1400 CE, and had at its peak a population of around 10,000.

==== United States ====
===== Rediscovered =====
- Ajacán Mission – an attempt by Spain to found a mission in Virginia in the mid-16th century. The entire party of 30 was massacred by Native Americans in February 1571. Only one survivor was left.
- The cities of the Ancestral Pueblo (or Anasazi) culture, located in the Four Corners region of the Southwest United States – The best known are located at Chaco Canyon and Mesa Verde.
- Etzanoa – located in Arkansas City, Kansas. City of the Wichita culture. It was home to around 20,000 people at its height, and it was inhabited from c. 1450–1700 AD.
- Fort San Juan (Joara) - a Spanish fort build by the Pardo expedition in 1567. Destroyed by Indians one year later. Rediscovered in 2016.
- Bethel Indian Town, New Jersey – Lenape settlement which disappeared as the Lenape were pushed west.
- Cahokia – Located near present-day St. Louis, Missouri. At its height Cahokia is believed to have had a population of between 40,000 and 80,000 people, making it amongst the largest Pre-Columbian cities of the Americas. It is known chiefly for its huge pyramidal mounds of compacted earth. Now a UNESCO World Heritage Site.
- Pueblo Grande de Nevada a complex of villages, located near Overton, Nevada
- Roanoke Colony
- Sarabay – a Mocama settlement in northeast Florida, mentioned in both French and Spanish documents dating to the 1560s.

=== South America ===
==== Inca cities ====
===== Rediscovered =====
- Choquequirao – One of the last bastions of Incan resistance against the Spaniards and refuge of Manco Inca Yupanqui.
- Machu Picchu – Possibly Pachacuti's Family Palace. Now a UNESCO World Heritage Site.
- Vilcabamba – Currently known as Espiritu Pampa, the capital of the Neo-Inca State (1539–1572).
- Vitcos – Currently known as Rosaspata, a residence and ceremonial center of the Neo-Inca State.

==== Other ====
===== Rediscovered =====
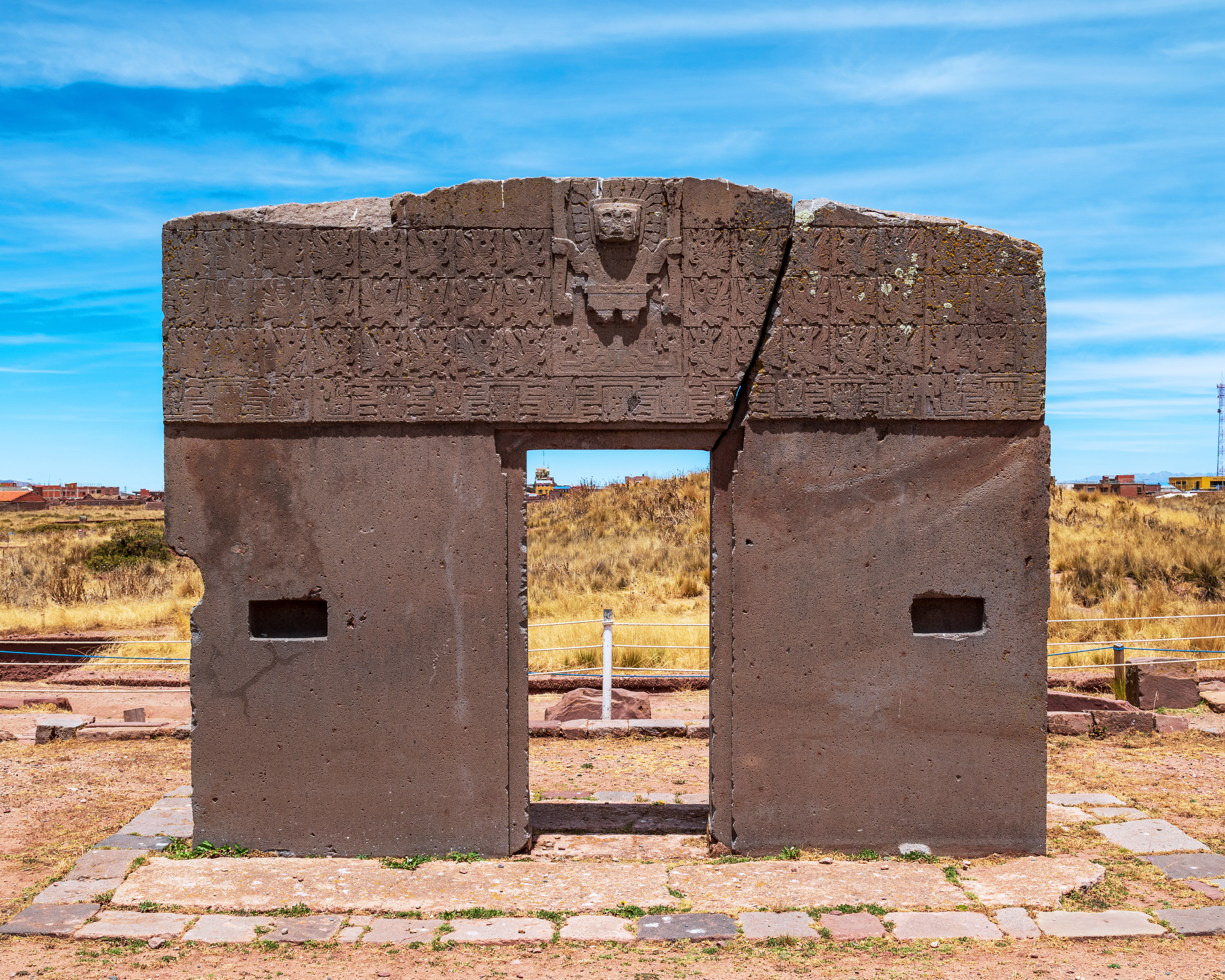
The "Gate of the Sun" in Tiwanaku

- Cahuachi – Nazca, in present-day Peru.
- Caral – An important center of the Norte Chico civilization, in present-day Peru. Now a UNESCO World Heritage Site.
- Chan Chan – Chimu. Located near Trujillo, in present-day Peru. Now a UNESCO World Heritage Site.
- Kuelap – A massive ruined city, still covered in jungle, that was the capital of the Chachapoyas culture in Northern Peru.
- Moche City – Largest city of the Moche culture. Known for its large semi-pyramidal buildings, Huaca del Sol and Huaca de la Luna.
- Nueva Cádiz – In Venezuela, one of the first Spanish settlements in the Americas.
- Santa María la Antigua del Darién – First permanent European settlement in the mainland of the continental Americas, in the Darién region between Panama and Colombia. Founded by Vasco Núñez de Balboa in 1510. Found in 2012.
- Teyuna (Ciudad Perdida) located in present-day Colombia.
- Tiahuanaco – pre-Inca site, also known as Tiwanaku. Located in present-day Bolivia. Now a UNESCO World Heritage Site.
- Upano Valley Sites – Urban complex in Ecuadorian Amazon, discovered in early 2024.

===== Status Unknown =====
- La Ciudad Blanca – a legendary settlement said to be located in the Mosquitia region of the Gracias a Dios Department in eastern Honduras.

== Undiscovered and fictional lost cities ==
=== Undiscovered ===
- Ai – important city in the Hebrew Bible
- Arthurian Camelot – the legendary castle of King Arthur
- Atlantis – mythical lost continent, mentioned in two of Plato's works, Timaeus and Critias
- Aztlán – the ancestral homeland in Aztec mythology
- Ciudad de los Cesares (City of the Caesars, also variously known as City of Patagonia, Elelín, Lin Lin, Trapalanda, Trapananda, or Wandering City) – a legendary city in Patagonia, never found
- Destinikon – a major city of early medieval Serbia, the location of which is lost
- Dvārakā – An ancient city of Krishna, submerged in the sea.
- El Dorado – a mythical city of gold in the Americas
- Iram of the Pillars – this may refer to a lost Arabian city in the Empty Quarter, but sources also identify it as a tribe or an area mentioned in the Quran
- Kitezh, Russia – legendary underwater city which supposedly may be seen in good weather
- Lemuria – An ancient, now sunken, land in the Pacific Ocean
- Libertatia, Madagascar – (Also known as Libertalia) was a pirate colony founded in the 17th century by pirate Captain James Misson (occasionally spelled "Mission") that is still disputed by historians today.
- Lost City of Z – a city allegedly located in the jungles of the Mato Grosso region of Brazil, said to have been seen by the British explorer Col. Percy Harrison Fawcett some time before World War I
- Lyonesse – a stretch of land from Cornwall, England, into the Celtic Sea
- Otuken – legendary capital city of Gokturks in Turkic mythology
- Paititi – a legendary city and refuge in the rainforests where Bolivia, Brazil, and Peru meet
- The Seven Cities of Gold
- Shambhala – Mythical kingdom said to be located in Tibet
- Sodom and Gomorrah
- Vineta – legendary city somewhere at the Baltic coast of Germany or Poland
- Ys – legendary city on the western coast of France

That some cities are considered legendary does not mean they did not in fact exist. Some that were once considered legendary are now known to have existed, such as Troy and Bjarmaland.

=== Fictional ===
- Brigadoon – from the musical of the same name
- Charn – from The Chronicles of Narnia
- Leng – Antarctic city described in H.P. Lovecraft's At the Mountains of Madness
- Númenor – from The Lord of the Rings and other works in Tolkien's legendarium
- Opar – from the Tarzan novels by Edgar Rice Burroughs (named for his long-time hometown of Oak Park, Illinois); the series features several such lost cities, but Opar is the one which appears most often
- R'lyeh – sunken city referenced in many of the works of H. P. Lovecraft, where the godlike being Cthulhu is buried
- Sarnath – city described in H.P. Lovecraft's short story "The Doom that Came to Sarnath"
- Shangri-La – fictional place from James Hilton's 1933 novel Lost Horizon
- Loo – capital of the lost African kingdom of Kukuanaland in Sir H. Rider Haggard's King Solomon's Mines
- Kôr – created by Sir H. Rider Haggard for his Ayesha series of adventure novels
- Zu-Vendis – appearing in Sir H. Rider Haggard's Allan Quatermain
- Kaloon – Central Asian lost city in Ayesha: The Return of She by Sir H. Rider Haggard
- Walloo – appears in Heu-Heu; or, The Monster, one of the eighteen Allan Quatermain stories by Sir H. Rider Haggard, many of which feature lost worlds, races and cities
- Skull Island – from the King Kong movies
- The Nameless City – ancient city in the Arabian desert described in H.P. Lovecraft's short story "The Nameless City"
- Carcosa – created by Ambrose Bierce in "An Inhabitant of Carcosa," and later used by Robert W. Chambers and many Cthulhu Mythos writers beginning with H.P. Lovecraft
- Valyria – from George R. R. Martin's A Song of Ice and Fire universe

== See also ==
- Abandoned village
- Ephemerality
- Ghost town
- List of mythological places
- List of lost lands
- Ruins
- Societal collapse
