= Samosdelka =

Russian village once claimed to be site of Atil, the Khazar capital

Coordinates: 46.02400°N 47.83975°E

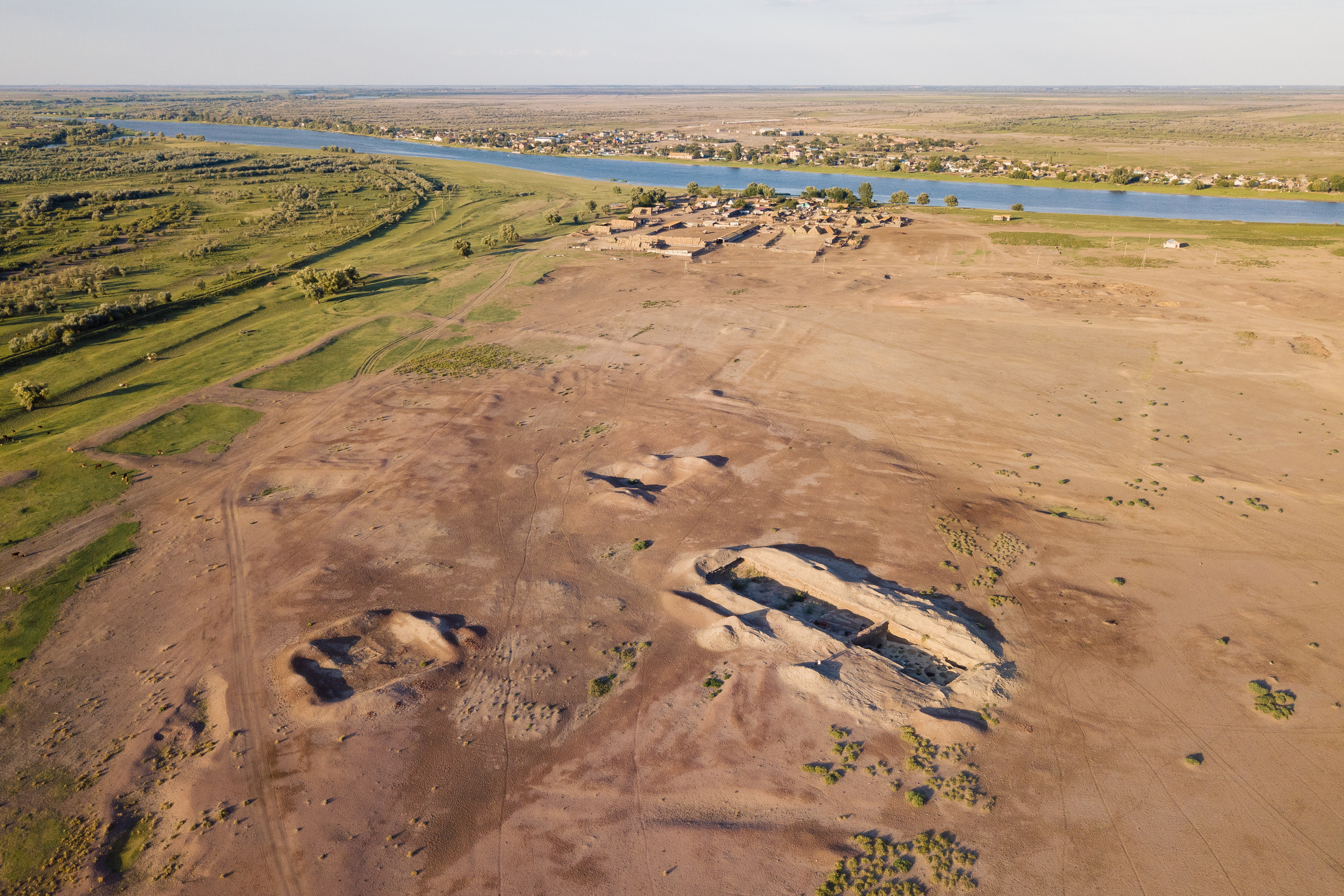
Excavations at Samosdelskoe settlement in 2020.

Samosdelka (Russian: Самосделка) is a fishing village in the Astrakhan Oblast of southern Russia, approximately 40 km south-southwest of the city of Astrakhan, in the Volga River delta area of the Caspian Depression marshlands. In September 2008, Russian archaeologists excavating in Samosdelka announced their discovery of what they claimed were the remains of Atil, the capital of the medieval Khazar kingdom. The claim was considered sensational and, owing to the absence of archaeological evidence, did not meet with widespread acceptance. A 2020 assessment by the Russian Geographic Society concluded that Atil had not been found in Samosdelka, and announced that new excavations were underway at another site, Semibugry.

== Archaeology ==
Head archaeologist Dmitry Vasilyev of Astrakhan State University and his team began excavations at the site in 1999. The research was sponsored in part by the Simon Dubnow Higher Humanitarian School (called the "Jewish University in Moscow" until 2003) and by the Russian Jewish Congress, a Russian nonprofit. In 2008 Vasilyev publicly announced that his team had unearthed the foundations of a triangular fortress of fired brick and had discovered the remains of yurt-like dwellings. Vasilyev claimed that the findings were the remains of Atil. A major indication that led him to his conclusion, Vasilyev said, was the presence of kiln-fired (as opposed to dried-mud) bricks, as Khazar law restricted the use of fired bricks to the capital.

In his announcement to the Associated Press (AP), Vasilyev heralded the "great significance" of his team's "discovery of the capital" of Khazaria. Vasilyev told the AP that "we should view [the purported discovery] as part of Russian history," and that "in many ways, Russia is a successor of the Khazar state".

Vasilyev claimed that the excavations conformed to written sources. In an item on Vasilyev's announcement, Hadassah Magazine reported that in an interview with Russian news agency RIA Novosti, Russian Jewish Congress spokesperson Evgeniy Satanovsky professed his view that the Khazars, "with their federated structure and peacefully coexisting religions," were to be understood as a "model for modern Russia."

In a 2003 paper, Vasilyev remarked that the central portion of Samosdelka was situated on an island between dry riverbeds, and that historical documents locate Atil's castle on an island in the center of the city. He noted that the fortress at Samosdelka was said to have a triangular shape and was made from "limestone bricks", and that written sources say that the Khazar khagan had a monopoly on brick buildings.

Vasilyev said that traces of a widespread fire were found at Samosdelka in an Atil layer, and that the fire was probably set during the conquest of Atil by Kievan Rus' prince Sviatoslav I in 968 or 969 CE. Layers dated to the 11th-12th centuries have Oghuz artifacts; these layers are associated with the medieval city of Saqsin, also in the Volga delta.

== Responses ==
Following Vasilyev's announcement, researcher Kevin Alan Brook wrote that he was "confident" that the team found Atil, even as he acknowledged that the site has yielded no Jewish artifacts.

Dr. Simon Kraiz, an expert on Eastern European Jewry at Haifa University, was more cautious, remarking that only if the team has discovered Khazar writings would the findings "be very important."

Vasilyev's claim was labelled "premature" in a 2018 publication by Georgetown University Professor of Anthropology Marjorie Mandelstam Balzer.

On its website dated July 2020, the Russian Geographical Society stated that while "many scholars" identified Samosdelka with Atil, artifacts of the Saltovo-Mayaki culture inherent to the Khazar Khaganate "were not found". The Society announced that it was on "the threshold of the great discovery" of Atil, this time in the nearby village of Semibugry.

Professor Alex M. Feldman of the University of Birmingham wrote that "textual and archaeological evidence provides some support" for identifying the site with Atil but noted some objections to the idea, including that none of the coins uncovered there date back "as early as the tenth century".

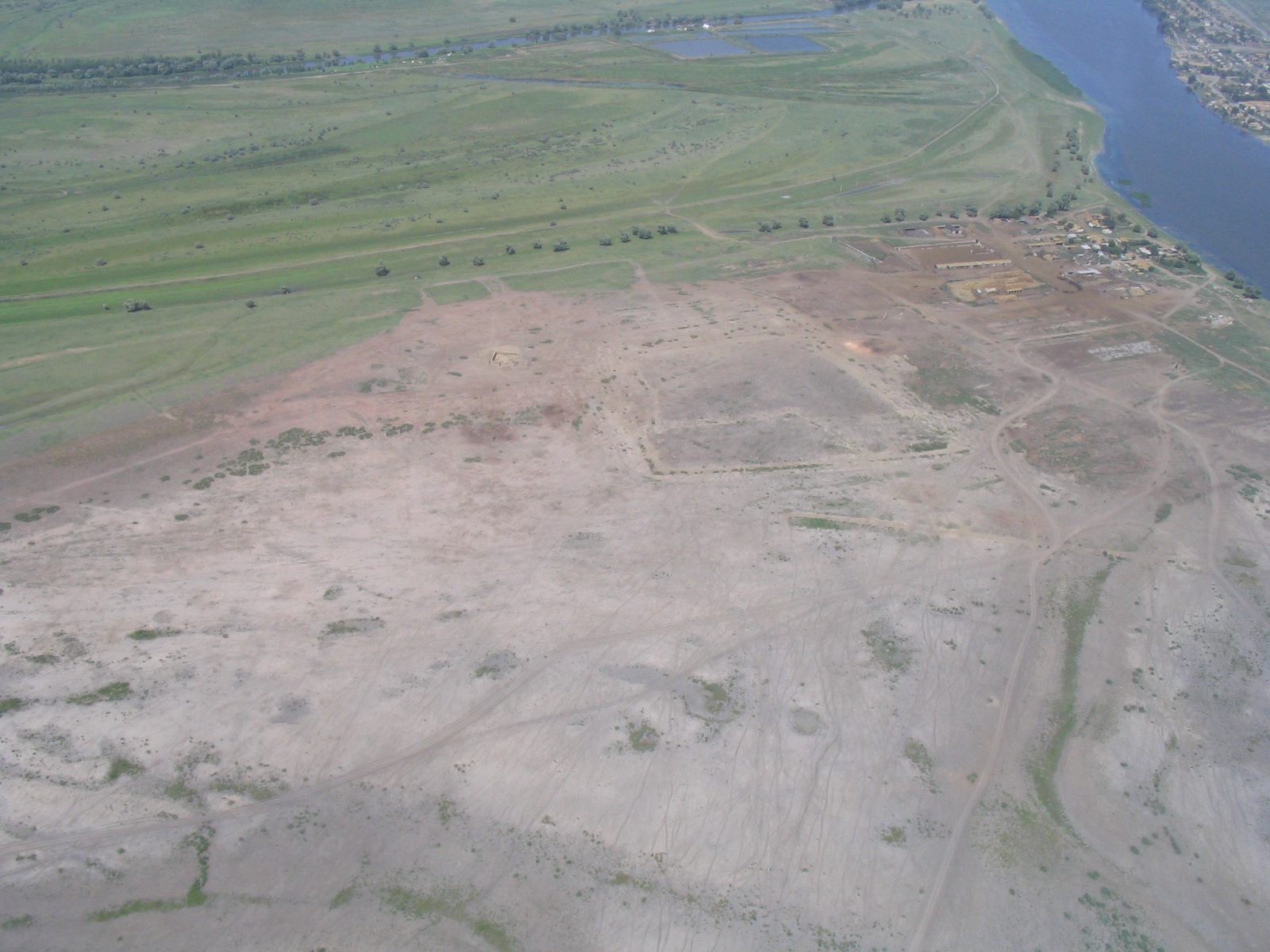
Medieval fortified town near Samosdelka
