= Peremyshl =

Peremyshl may refer to:

- Peremyshl, Russia, a village in Kaluga Oblast, Russia
- Peremyshl, Muscovy, a former town of Muscovy

== See also ==
- Przemyśl
