= Köinge =

Köinge may refer to the following places in Sweden:

- Köinge, Falkenberg Municipality, a village
- Köinge, Hörby Municipality, a village in Hörby Municipality
