= Acerrae =

Acerrae (ancient Greek: Ἀχέρραι) was the ancient Roman name for three towns or cities:

- Acerrae (Campania), today's Acerra, some thirteen miles north-east of Naples
- Acerrae (Cisalpine Gaul), in today's Lombardy
- Acerrae Vatriae, said by Pliny to have been in Umbria
