= Battle of Axtorna =

1565 battle of the Northern Seven Years' War

- Part of Northern Seven Years' War
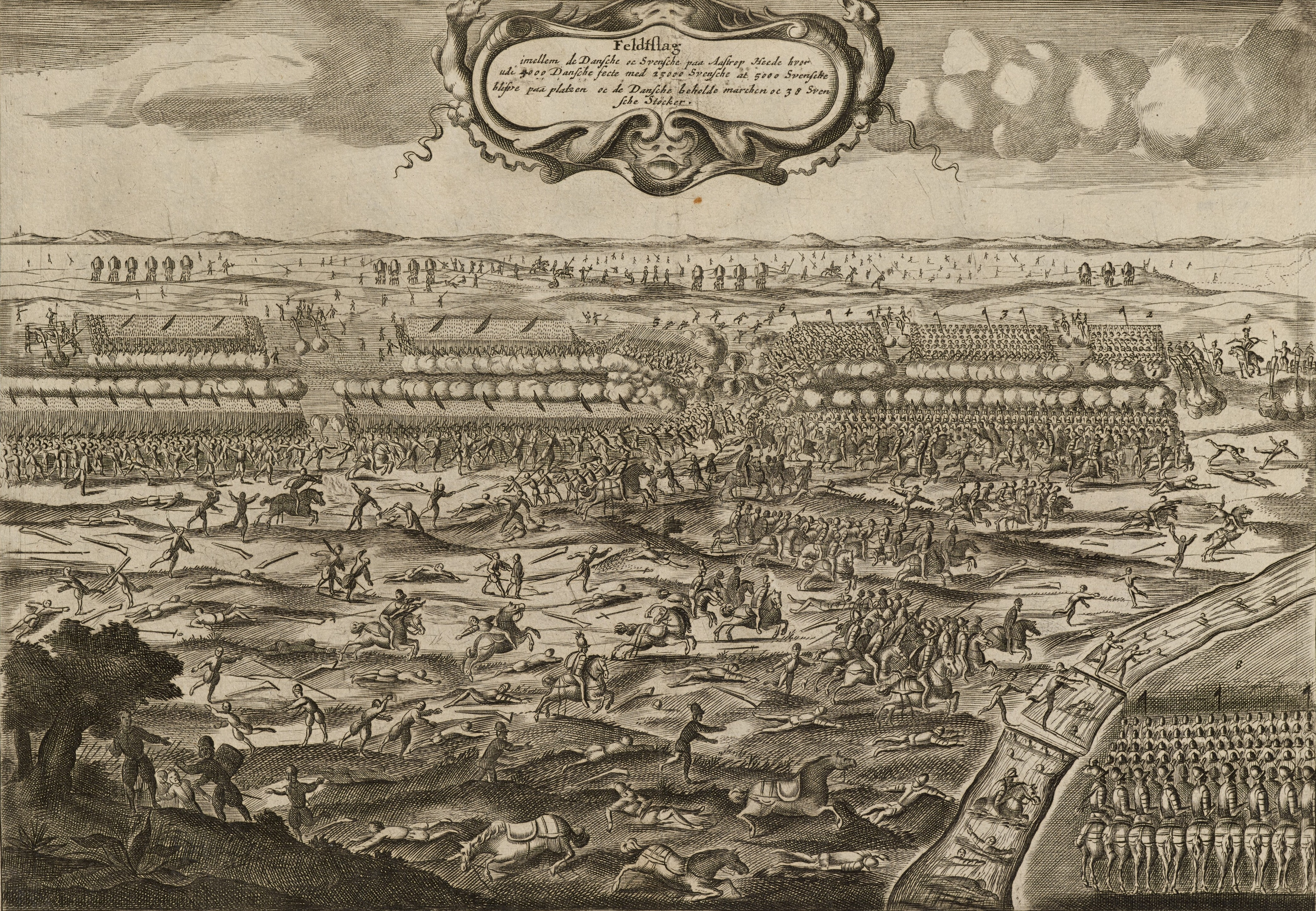
- Old Danish propaganda image of the battle
Date	20 October 1565
Location	Axtorna, close to Falkenberg, Sweden 57.040°N 12.643°E
Result	Danish victory

Belligerents
Sweden	Denmark–Norway

Commanders and leaders
(History of Sweden (1523–1611)) Jakob Henriksson	(Denmark–Norway) Daniel Rantzau

Strength
11,100 (Note: 8,100 infantry and 3,000 cavalry)–20,000 men	7,400 (Note: 6,000 infantry and 1,400 cavalry)–9,000 men 21 artillery pieces

Casualties and losses
1,200–1,700	300–2,500
- 4,000 men from both sides

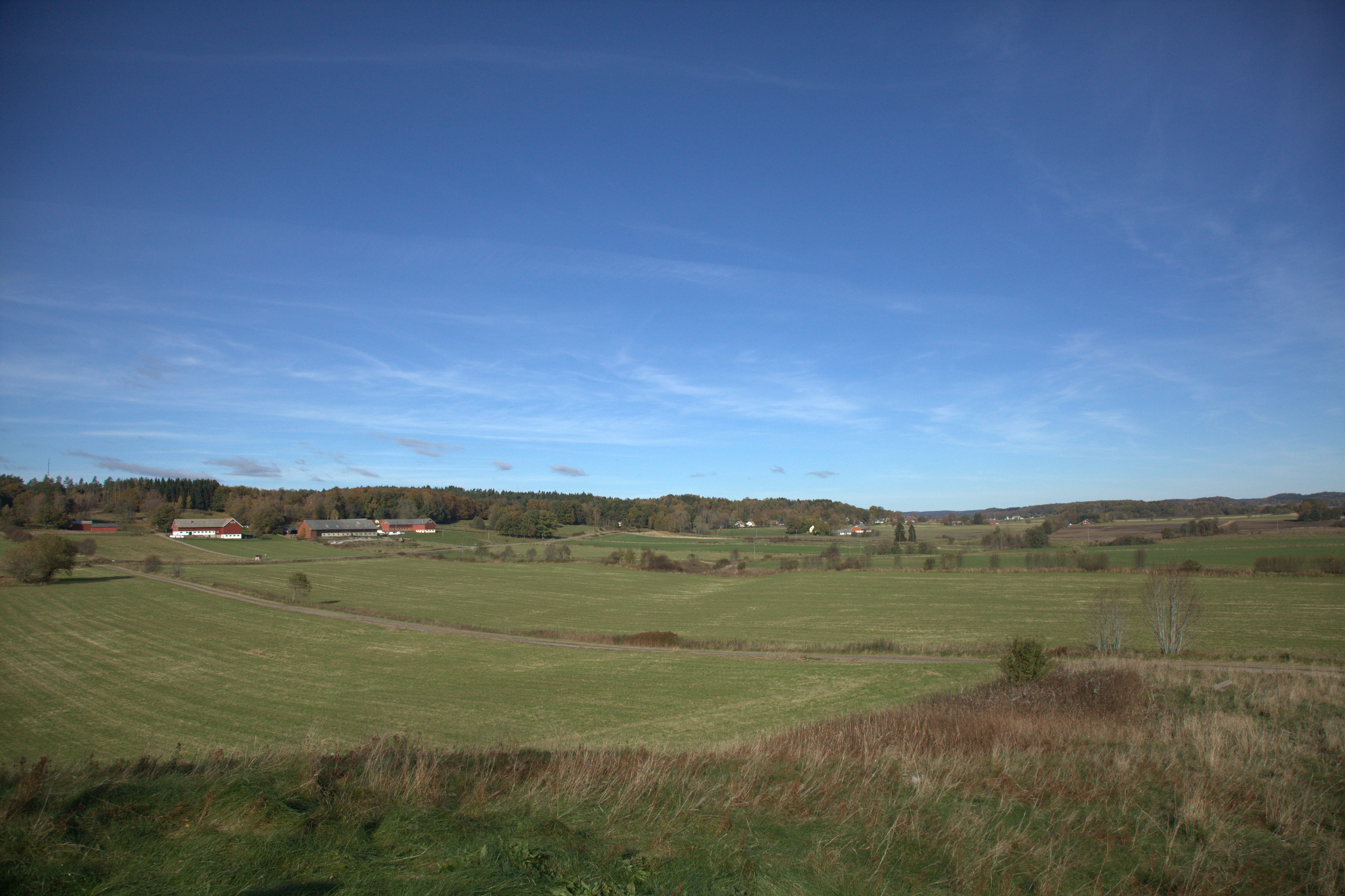
The fields where the battle took place. The photo is approximately taken from the Danish position facing north towards the Swedish position.

The Battle of Axtorna or simply Axtorna, was fought between the Kingdom of Sweden and Denmark–Norway 20 October 1565 at Axtorna, a small village in what is today Falkenberg Municipality, Halland County in south-western Sweden.

== Battle ==
The Danish commander Daniel Rantzau had been forced to yield the fortress Varberghus to the Swedes on 15 September 1565, after they had taken Ny Varberg, then Halland's largest city. Rantzau received the news that a Swedish army of superior strength led by Jacob Henriksson Hästesko was approaching from the east, forcing him to move his forces toward Falkenberg. Rantzau had decided to commit to combat since the Swedish force had just arrived from its march and hadn't rearranged into a militarily cohesive unit.

== Aftermath ==
The Danes won as a consequence of their superior cavalry tactic and Rantzau became a renowned general after the battle and throughout the war. Despite the victory and the capture of the Swedish artillery, the Danish had suffered great losses and stayed near the battlefield for a week, while large portions of the Swedish army were intact.
