= Itil =

Itil may refer to:

- Atil or Itil, the ancient capital of Khazaria
- Itil (river) or Volga, the longest river in Europe
- ITIL (IT Infrastructure Library), a set of practices for IT service management
