= Okome =

Coordinates: 57°03′27″N 12°41′35″E

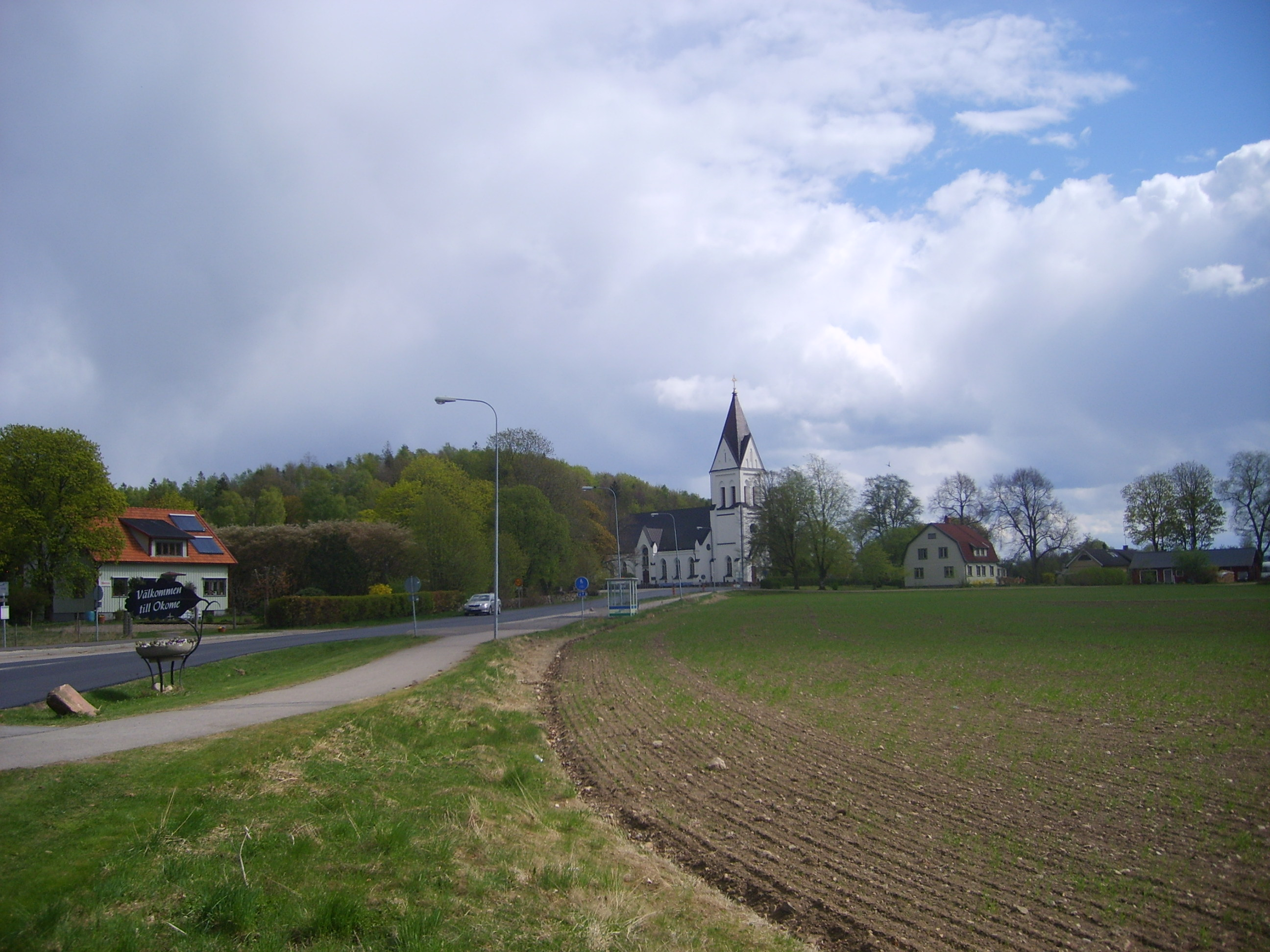
Okome

Okome (Swedish pronunciation: [ˈûːkʊmɛ]) is a parish and village in Falkenberg, Sweden. The village has a population of about 160, and the parish as a whole has a population of about 500. The village has some services, such as a primary school and a car repair shop. As well as Okome Village the parish also includes Köinge and Svartrå, as well as parts of Ätrafors.
