= Khazz =

The Khazz was the ethnarch of the Muslim community in Khazaria. The Khazz resided in the city of Khazaran. He may have had some authority over the division of the army known as the Arsiyah.
