= Svartrå =

Former village and parish in the Municipality of Falkenberg

Coordinates: 57°08′28″N 12°38′33″E

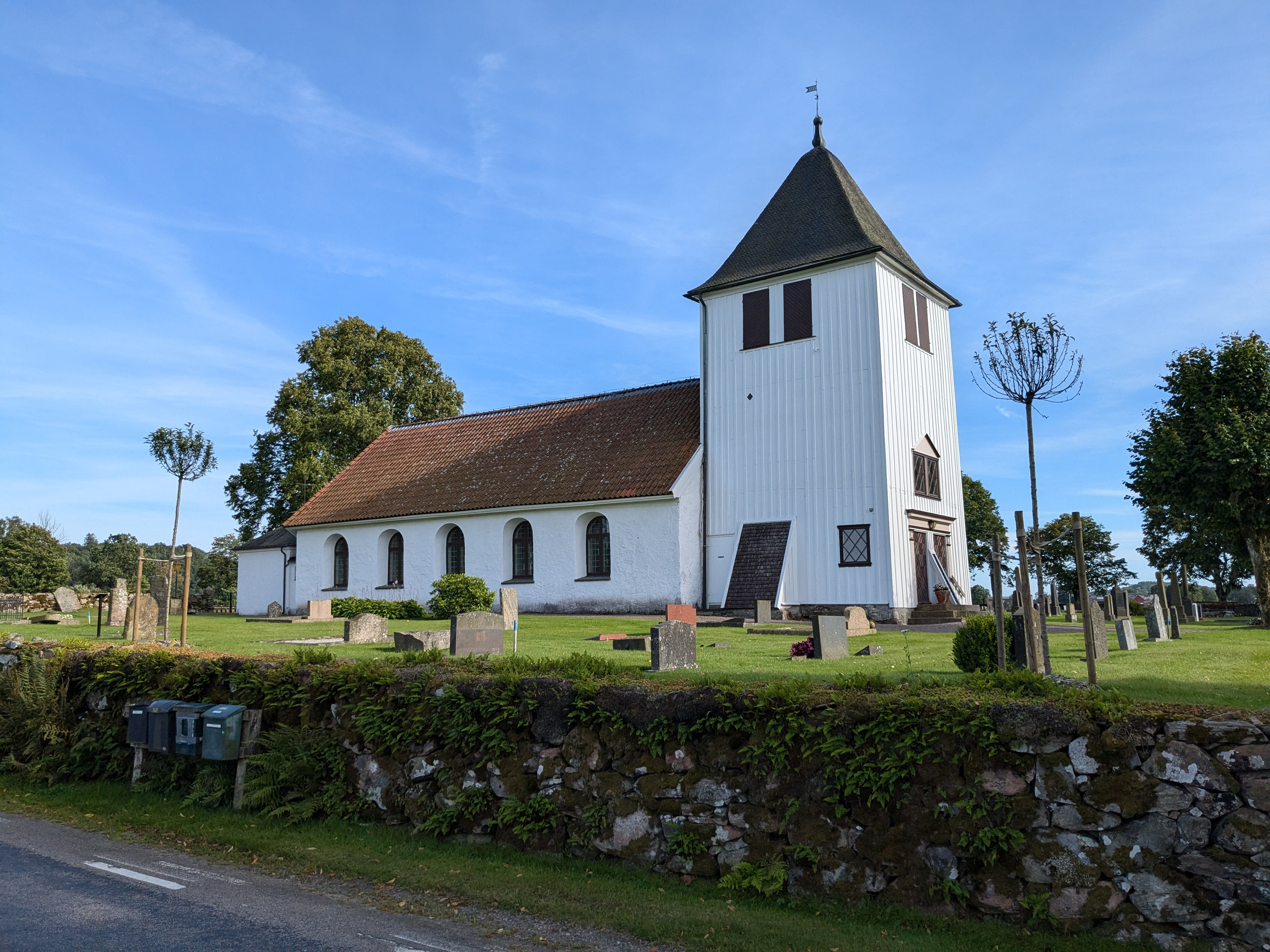
Svartrå Church, which dates back to the 12th century.

Svartrå is a former village and parish in Falkenberg Municipality, Sweden with about 200 citizens. It formed a parish until 2006, when the parish merged with Köinge and Okome parishes to form Okome parish. It was a municipality between 1863 and 1951. A brook, Svartån, flows through the area. It is likely to have given name to the village which in turn gave the parish its name. Svartrå was first mentioned in 1461, then spelt Swa[r]teraa. Svart means black, while rå means owner's mark or border.

The children usually attend Okome school until the age of 12, after which they attend Apelskolan in Ullared. However, the children in the northernmost part of the area spend all their compulsory education at Apelskolan. The area is a political stronghold for the Centre Party which usually gains around 50 percent of the votes.

== Geography and geology ==
Svartrå is bordered on the east by Högvadsån, of which Svartån is a tributary. The southern and eastern parts of the area are predominantly cultivated farmland, while the northern and western parts are covered by forests. The ratio between cultivated and forested areas, however, has fluctuated considerably throughout history and the parish was almost free of any forest as late as in the early 20th century. Sumpafallen and Björkekullen Nature Reserve are located in the area, the latter being a farm museum. As the ice receded during the last glacial period parts of Svartrå formed a bay. Glacier rivers eroded the land and made it comparatively hilly.

== History ==
Some remains from the Stone Age have been found, such as flint objects and arrow points. There are Bronze Age and Iron Age remains in the vicinity of the church, as well as Bronze Age remains at Vårdhögen, a hill top.

The church dates back to the 12th century and has survived several planned demolitions. The village was split up due to agricultural reforms in the mid 19th century (laga skifte).

Falkenberg railway and Varberg-Ätran railway had stations in Svartråhed and Skinnarlyngen in the first part of the 20th century. Svartrå had a school in one form or another from about 1850 to 1960. The population topped during the later part of the 19th century, when it reached about 500 people. It was depopulated during most of the 20th century, until a population of about 200 people was reached. It has remained on that level for the last decades.

== Economy ==
Svartrå has never been home to any major industrial activity, although it has had a few minor sawmills as well as a gravel pit.
