= Saqsin =

Medieval city situated in the Volga Delta

Saqsin, also known as Saksin and Saksin-Bolgar, was a medieval city that flourished from the eleventh to the thirteenth centuries. It was situated in the Volga Delta (modern-day Astrakhan Oblast), or in the Lower Volga region, and was known in pre-Mongol times as Saksin-Bolgar, which in Mongol times became Sarai Batu. It was mentioned by the Arab geographer al-Gharnati and the Persian Qazwini, among others, and recorded as "the land of the Saksins" in the report of Friar Benedict of Poland about the 1246 trip of Giovanni da Pian del Carpine through the camp of Mongol prince Batu Khan on the shores of the Volga. S.A. Pletneva locates Saksin between present Volgograd and Akhtubinsk.

Friar Benedict apparently misunderstood the name as somehow connected with the Saxons of Germany, stating incorrectly that the inhabitants were Christians and "believed to be Goths" related to those of Crimea (Crimean Goths). In actuality, they were probably Turkic and Muslim. Paul Pelliot linked it to Sesüd mentioned in the Secret History of the Mongols.

Saqsin may be an Arabized version of Sarighsin, Turkic for "Yellow City" or "White city". The identity of its inhabitants is unclear, though Carpine reports that Saksin province was inhabited by Kumans. It was situated near the ruins of Atil, the old Khazar capital, but there is no indication that it was part of any latter-day Khazar polity. It was situated in Kipchak territory and may have been the center for one of their principalities. Some sources claim that it was under the influence of the Volga Bulgars.

== Excavations ==
Beginning in 2003 Dmitry Vasilyev of Astrakhan State University led a series of excavations at the Samosdelskoye site near the village of Samosdelka (Russian: Самосделка) in the Volga Delta. Vasilyev connected artifacts from the middle strata with Khazar, Oghuz and Bulgar culture, leading him to believe that he had discovered the site of Saqsin. The matter is still unresolved. Sarai Batu was excavated by a number of expeditions exploring the center of the city, and was probably located on the periphery of the original Saqsin. The ruins of Atil appear to be underneath the layers presumed to represent Saqsin.
