= Khazaran =

City in Astrakhan Oblast, Russia

Khazaran was a city in the Khazar kingdom, located on the eastern bank of the lower Volga River. It was connected to Atil by a pontoon bridge.

Khazaran was later inhabited primarily by Muslims and featured numerous mosques, minarets, and madrasas. It was a bustling trade center easily reachable by ship from the Caspian Sea and Volga River, and many of its inhabitants were crafters, fishers, and traders. The leader of the city was a Muslim official known as the Khazz; in Arab sources the title given is sometimes vizier.
