= Atil =

Capital of Khazaria from 750 CE

Atil, also Itil, was the capital of the Khazar Khaganate from the mid-8th century to the late 10th century. It is known historically to have been situated along the Silk Road, on the northern coast of the Caspian Sea, in the Volga Delta region of what is now southern Russia. Its precise location has long been unknown.

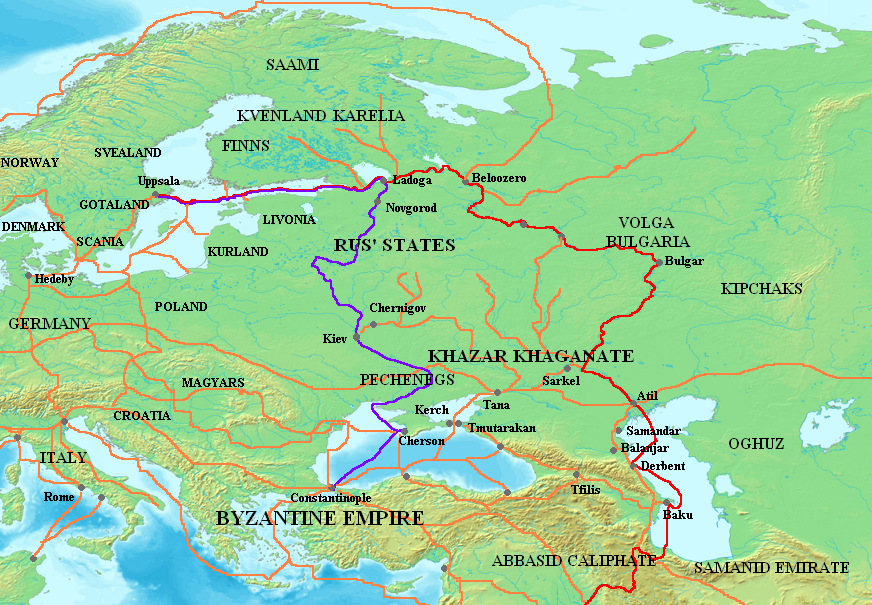
Khazaria and Eurasian trade routes in the 8th–11th centuries. Atil was the commercial hub from which routes extended into "Deep Asia". The Varangian (Viking) trade route on the Volga is shown in red; other routes are in orange. The Varangian-Greek route is in purple.

In 2008, a Russian archaeologist claimed to have discovered the remains of Atil in Samosdelka, a village in the Volga Delta approximately 30 km southwest of the city of Astrakhan. This claim has since been disproven and new excavations are underway in Semibugry.

== Name ==
The name Atil (or Itil) is often interpreted as deriving from a Finno-Ugric word meaning “river”. A related form appears in the term Atelkuzu (Ἀτελκούζου), recorded by the Byzantine emperor Constantine VII in reference to the region between rivers inhabited by the early Hungarians. Although the word does not survive in modern Hungarian, comparable hydronyms are attested elsewhere, such as the name of the White River (Ak Adil) in Bashkiria, and the ancestors of the Bashkirs spoke a Ugric language that was understandable to Hungarians as early as the 13th century.

A number of Islamic sources in particular Ibn Khordadbeh, Ibn Rustah and later compilers who used their information, record that the Khazar capital was called Hamlikh or Hamlij (the name Hamlikh may represent a slightly distorted form of the Hebrew expression ha-melekh (“the king”), possibly referring to the royal residence of the Khazar rulers following their conversion to Judaism). This information suggests that the name Atil became widespread only in the 10th century, when foreign authors began to refer to the Khazar capital as Atil. It is not known exactly what the Khazars themselves called it.

Ibn Rustah's version has led researchers to associate it with Mongolian word used to refer to Beijing in the 13th and 14th centuries, 'khanbaliqh' ("city of the khan"). However, such identification is generally considered unlikely due to the differences between the Khazar and Mongolian languages; moreover, the localization of Hamlikh with Khanbaliqh is possible only with significant assumptions, which reduces the credibility of this interpretation.

Modern Turkic languages have retained the historical name for the Volga. The Volga is known as İdel ( Идел) in Tatar, as Atăl (Атӑл) in Chuvash, as Iźelin in Bashkir, as Edıl in Kazakh, and as İdil in Turkish.

== History and description ==
Atil was located along the Volga delta at the northwestern corner of the Caspian Sea. Following the defeat of the Khazars in the Second Arab-Khazar War, Atil became the capital of Khazaria.

At its height, the city was a major center of trade. It consisted of three parts separated by the Volga. The western part contained the administrative center of the city, with a court house and a large military garrison. The eastern part of the city was built later and acted as the commercial center of Atil, and had many public baths and shops. Between them was an island on which stood the palaces of the Khazar Khagan and Bek. The island was connected to one of the other parts of the city by a pontoon bridge. According to Arab sources of the 10th century, one half of the city was referred to as Atil, while the other was named Khazaran.

Atil was a multi-ethnic and religiously diverse city, inhabited by Jews, Christians, Muslims, Shamanists, and Pagans, many of them traders from foreign countries. All of the religious groups had their own places of worship in the city, and there were seven judges appointed to settle disputes (two Christian, two Jewish, and two Muslim judges, with a single judge for all of the Shamanists and other Pagans). The numerous Christians of Atil were under the jurisdiction of their own bishop; the minaret of the Friday mosque of the Muslims of Atil is said to have been higher than the castle.

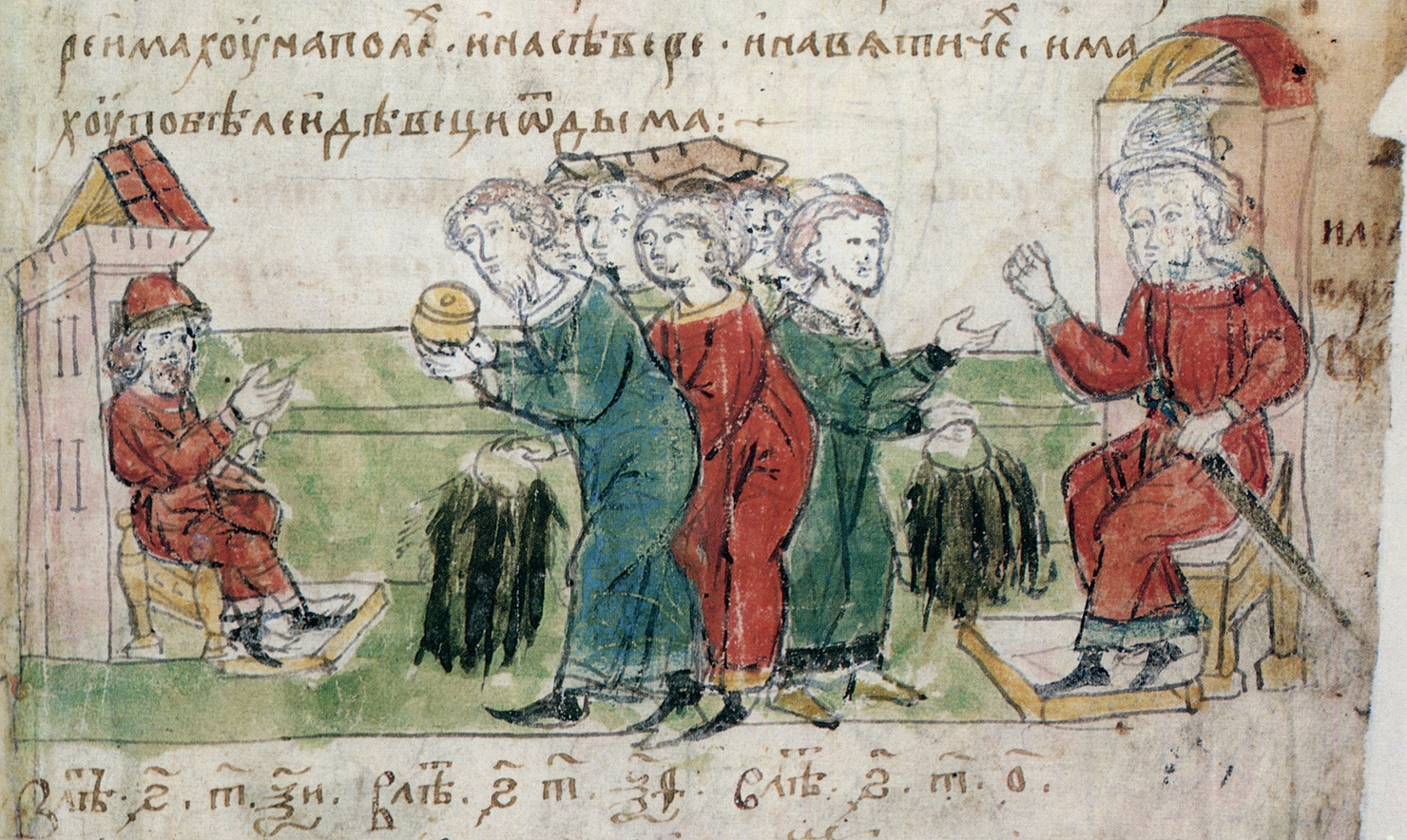
Miniature depicting payment of tribute to the Varangians and the Khazars, Radziwiłł Chronicle

The city was a major trade center, and managed the Khazar slave trade, in which slaves bought for export were transported from the Khazar Khaganate to either the Black Sea slave trade in the West via the Black Sea port of Kerch, or East from the capital of Atil via the Caspian Sea to Central Asia and from there to slavery in the Abbasid Caliphate.

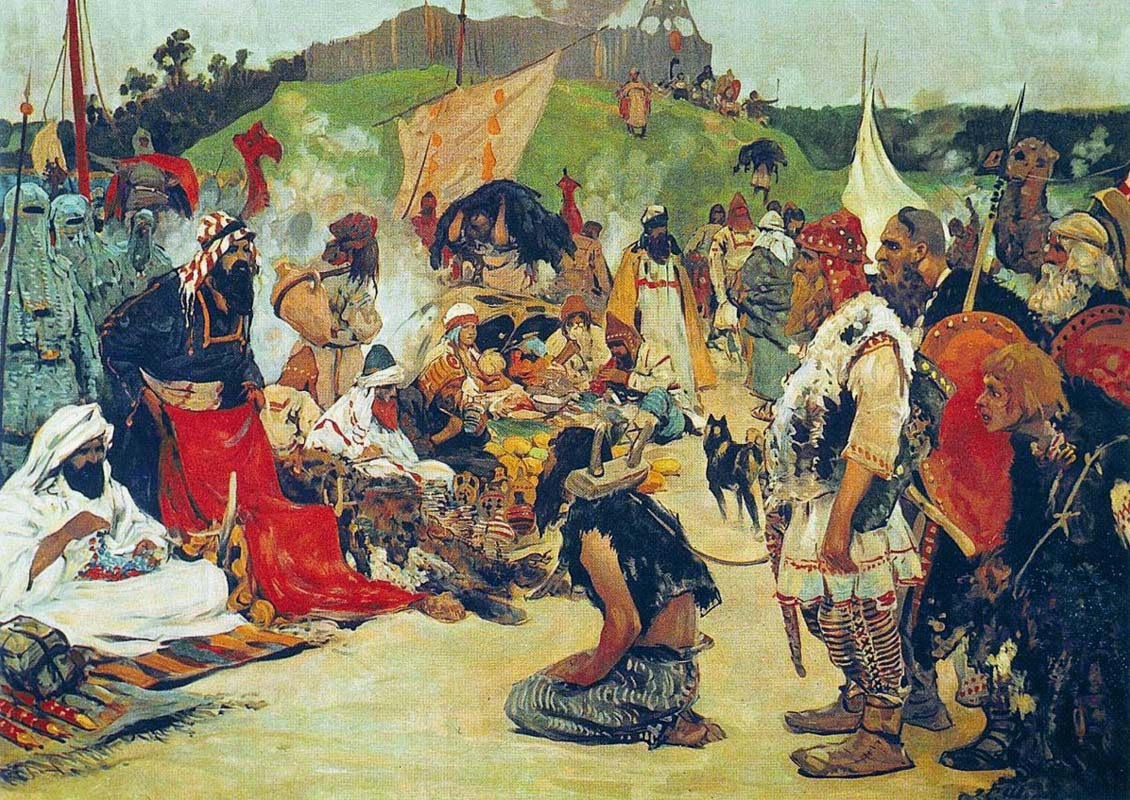
The Rus' trading slaves with the Khazars: Trade in the East Slavic Camp by Sergei Ivanov (1913)

Svyatoslav I of Kiev sacked Atil in 968 or 969 CE. Ibn Hawqal and al-Muqaddasi refer to Atil after 969, indicating that it may have been rebuilt. Al-Biruni (mid-11th century) reported that Atil was again in ruins, and did not mention the later city of Saqsin which was built nearby, so it is possible that this new Atil was only destroyed in the middle of the 11th century.

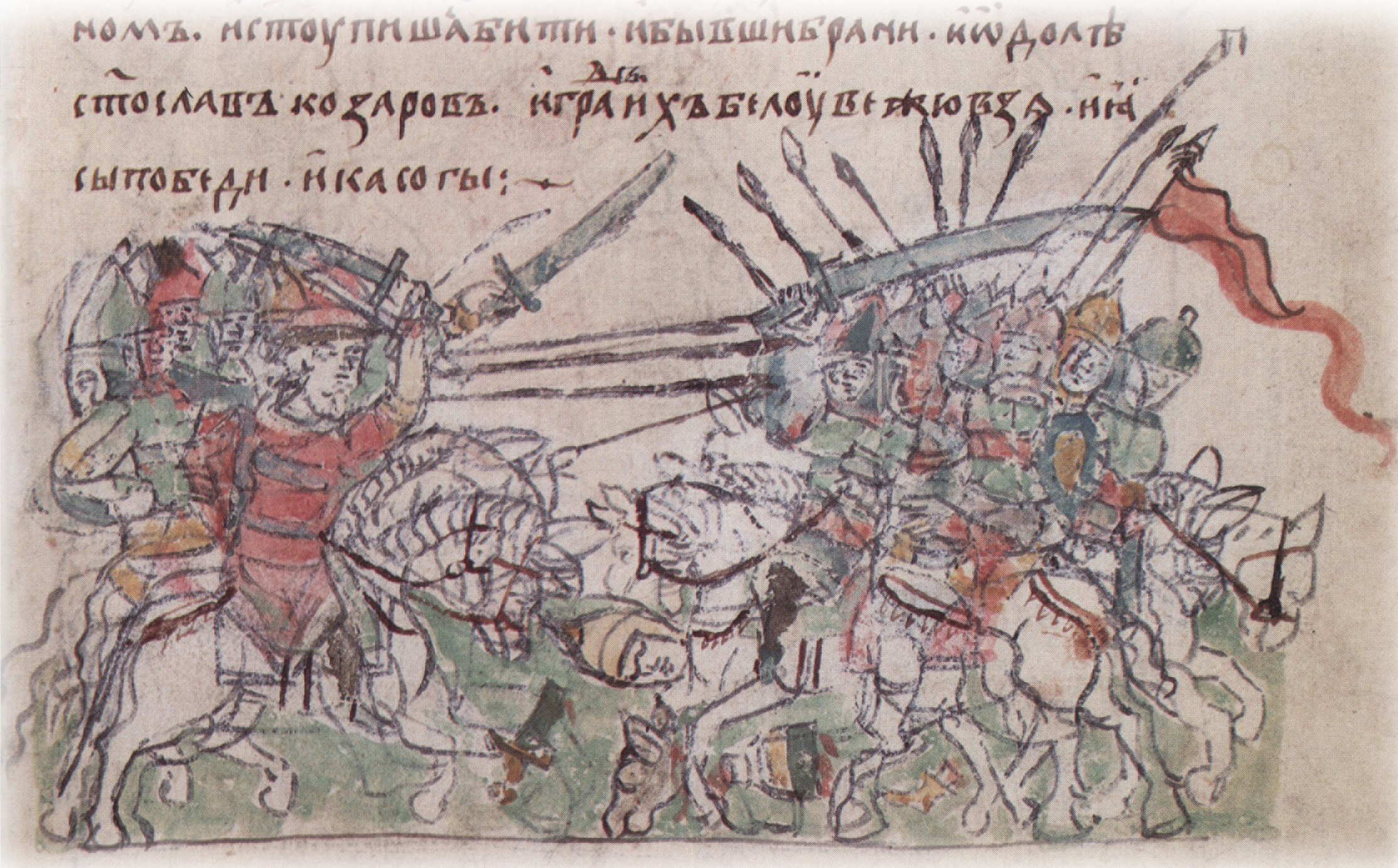
The eastern campaign of Prince Svtoslav in 965, in which he captured the White Tower and defeated the Khazar Khaganate, Radziwiłł Chronicle

== The search for archaeological remains ==
As of 2024, the archaeological remains of Atil have not been positively identified. An accepted hypothesis is that they were washed away by the rising level of the Caspian Sea.

=== Samosdelka site ===
In September 2008, Russian archaeologists excavating in the Volga Delta fishing village of Samosdelka announced their discovery of what they claimed were the remains of Atil. A 2020 assessment by the Russian Geographic Society concluded that Atil had not been found in Samosdelka, and announced that new excavations were underway at another site.

=== Semibugry site ===
The archaeological remains of a settlement from the Khazar period near the village of Semibugry (Russian: Семибугры) in the central part of the Volga Delta were discovered after Samosdelka and as of 2020 were being excavated in the hopes that the settlement was Atil. According to historian Alex Feldman, "it remains impossible to archaeologically prove" the location of Atil.

== Gallery ==
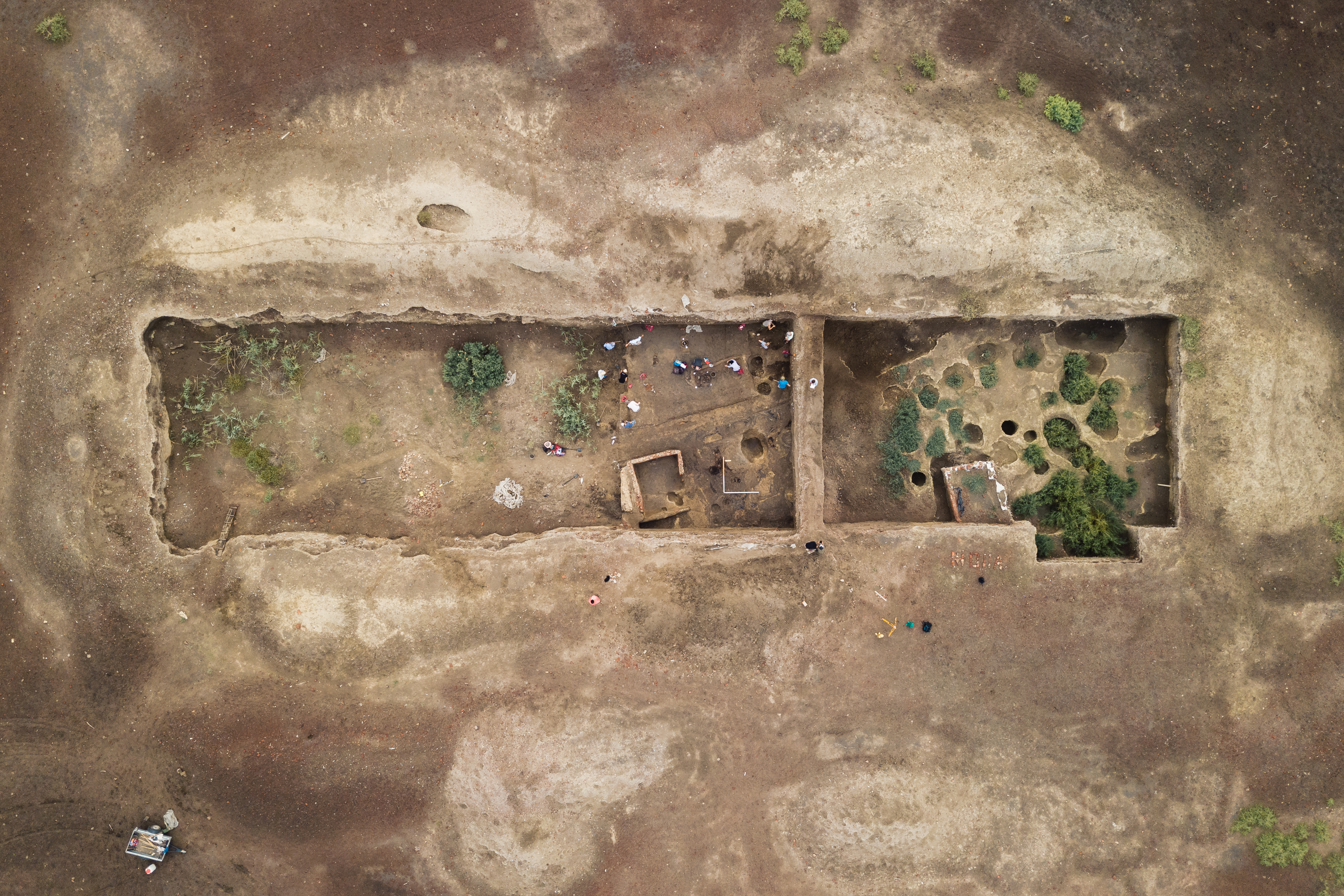

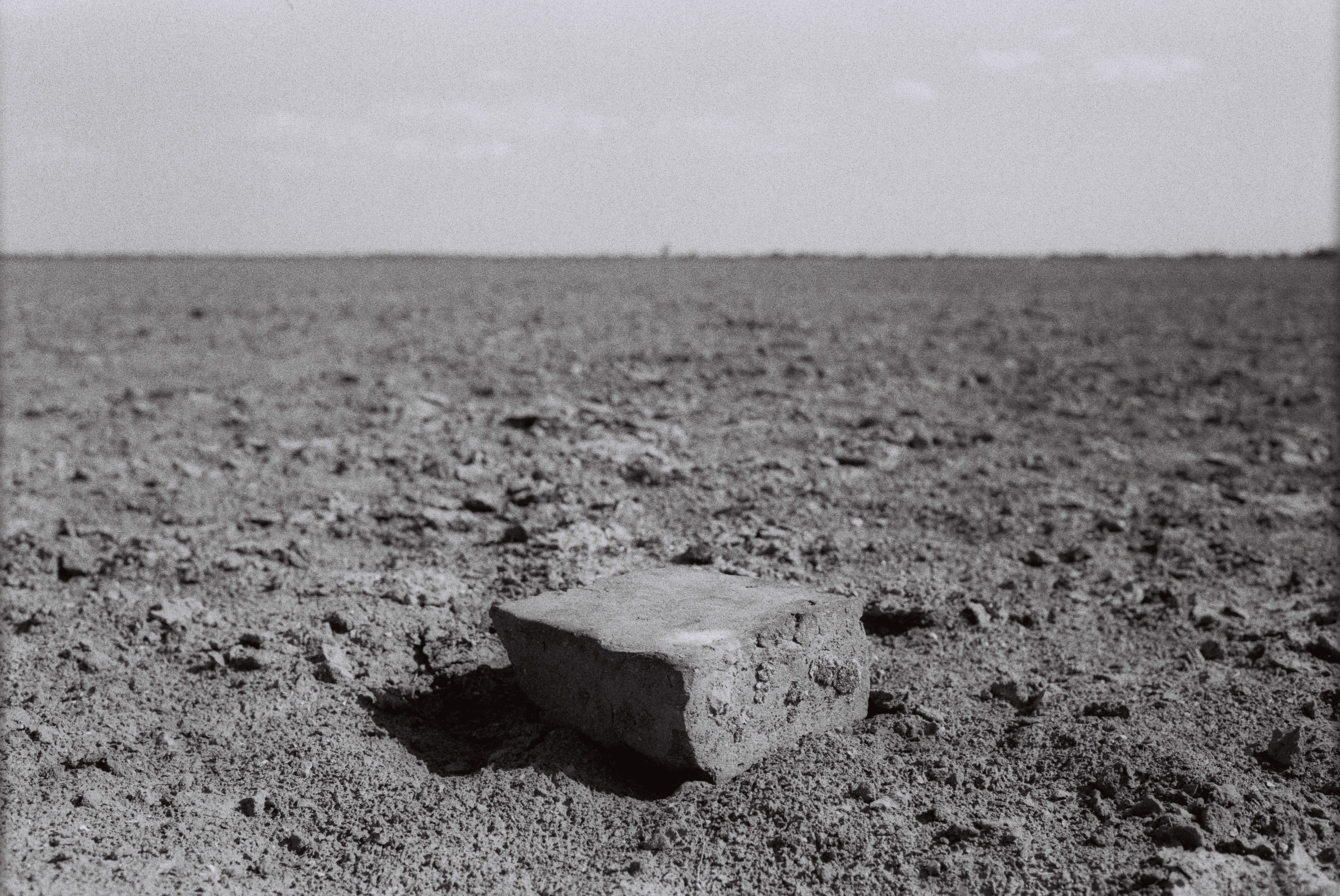

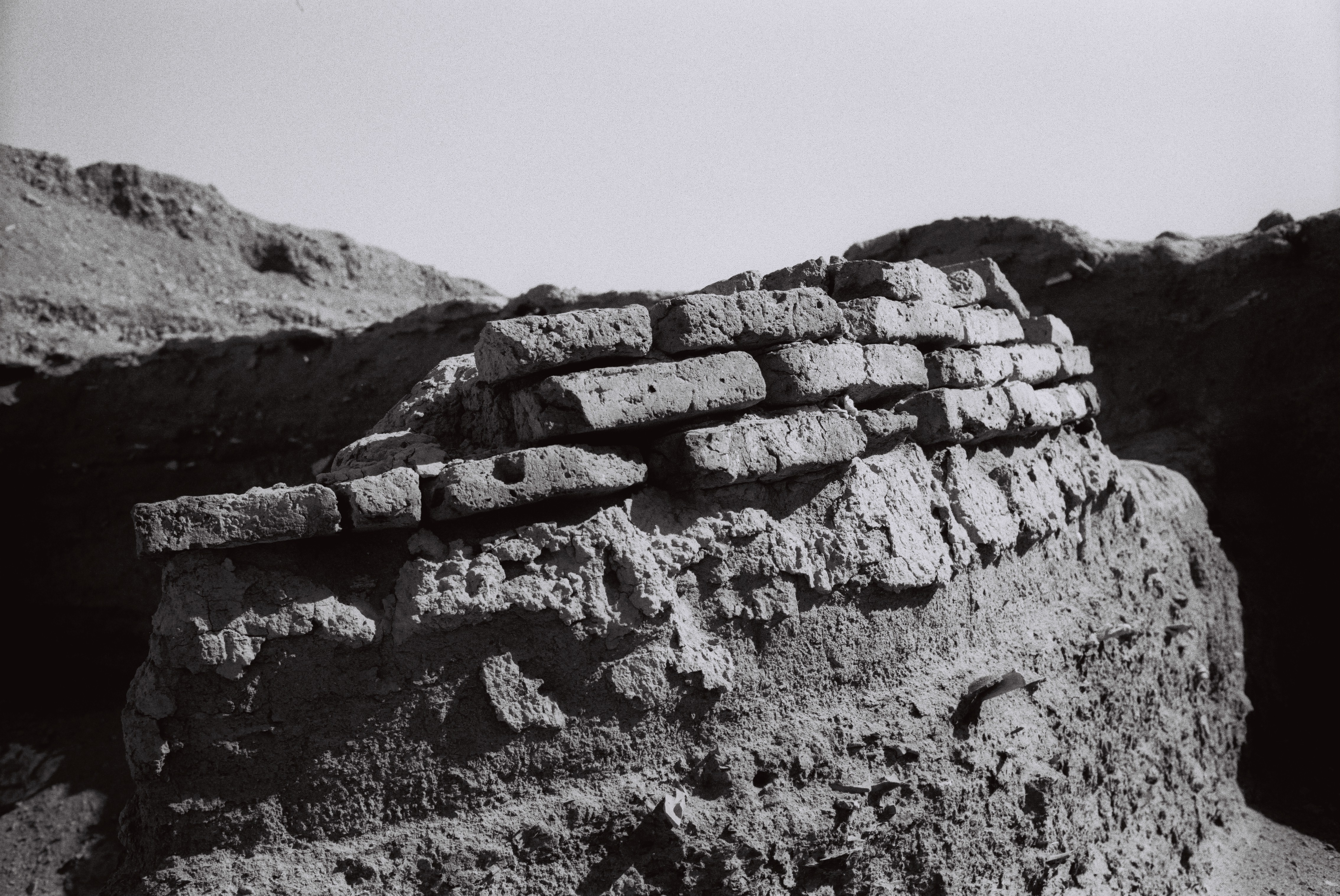

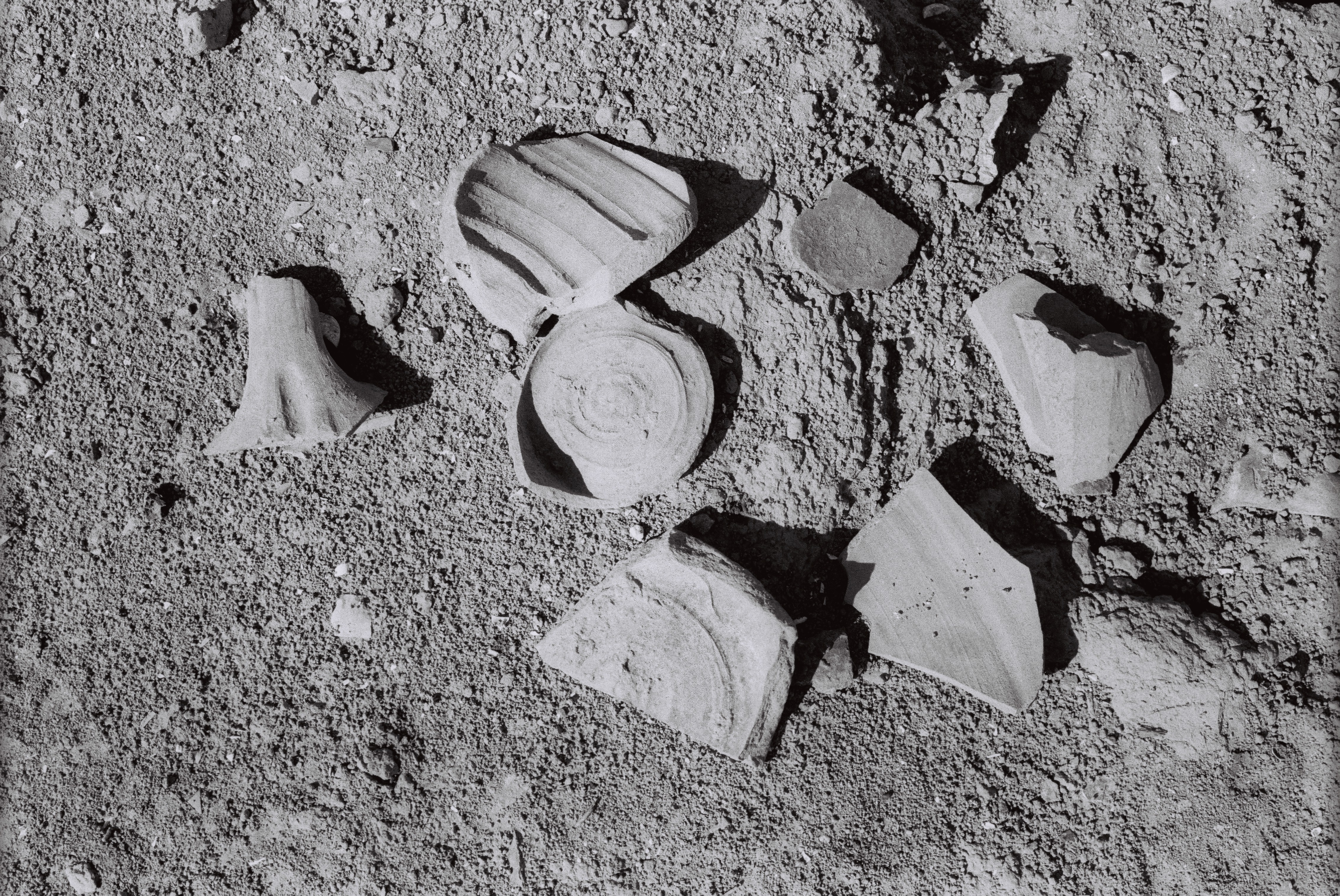

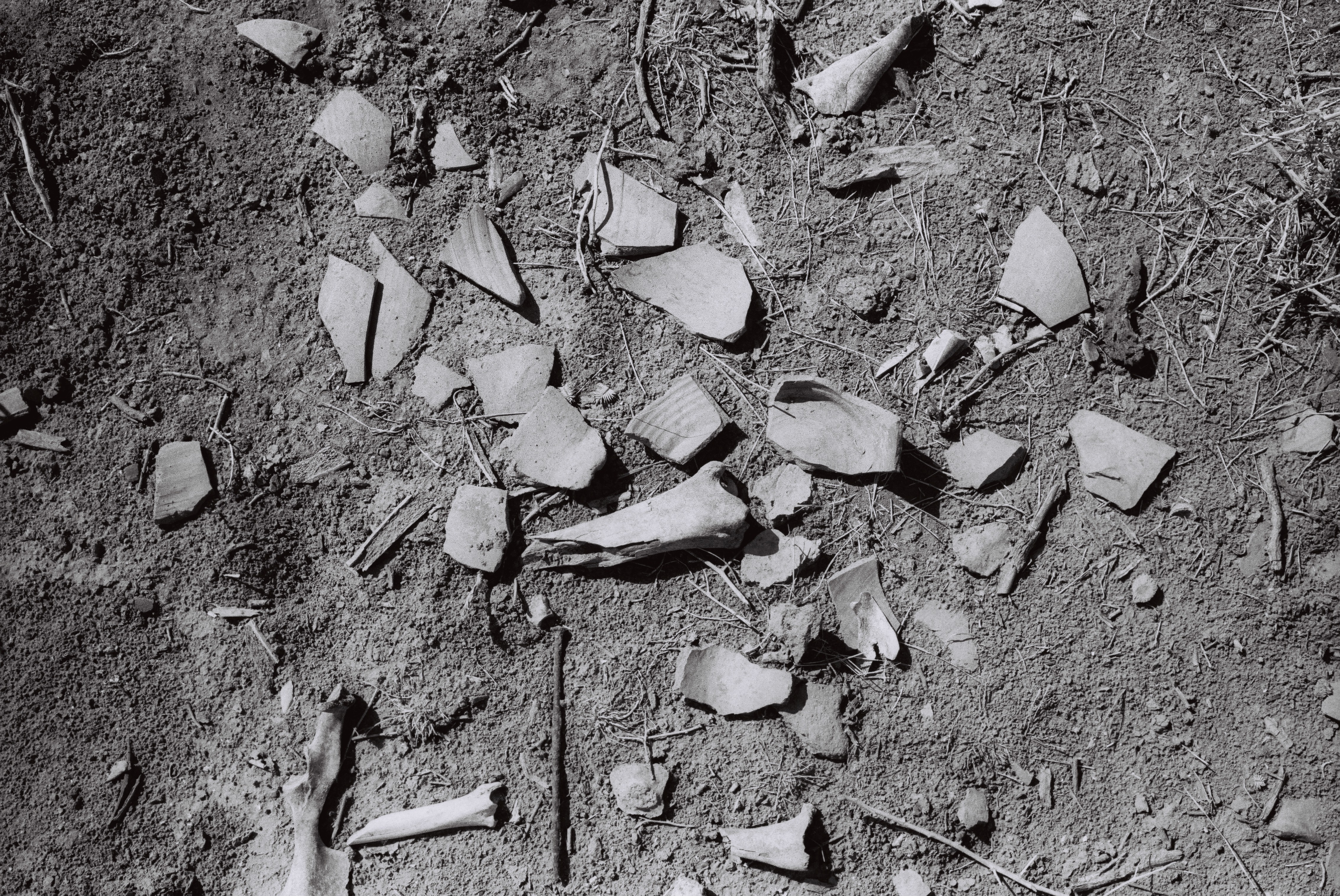

== Sources ==
- Brook, Kevin Alan (2018). The Jews of Khazaria, Third Edition. London: Rowman & Littlefield Publishers, Inc. doi:10.5040/9798881833770. ISBN 9781538103425.
