= Köinge, Falkenberg Municipality =

Village in southwest Sweden

Coordinates: 57°03′49″N 12°38′38″E

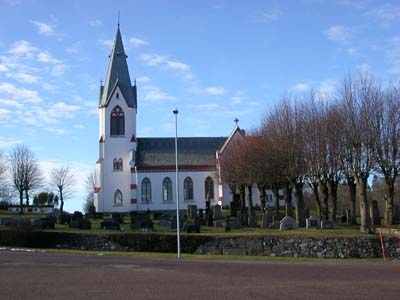
Köinge church

Köinge (Swedish pronunciation: [ˈkøːŋɛ]) is a village in Falkenberg Municipality, Sweden. It formed a separate parish until 2005, when it became a part of Okome parish. The village has about 200 inhabitants.

== History ==
The first written record of the village is found in 1362. Several alternative interpretations of the name exists. The battle of Axtorna in 1565 took place not far from the village.

It used to be seat of the local district court, and did then have an execution place.

A golden necklace from the Migration Period was found in 1889.

A comic museum, Comicland, existed in Köinge from 1988 to 2004.

== Infrastructure ==
County road 154 passes through the village, as does, in perpendicular direction, road 782, which connects the village with Svartrå and Ätrafors.

The Falkenberg railway (1894–1959) had a station in the village. The building was later used as a post office and a library.

== People from Köinge ==
- Göran Karlsson, founder of Gekås
