= Acerrae Vatriae =

Human settlement in Italy

Acerrae Vatriae is mentioned by Pliny the Elder as having been a town of the Sarranates situated in Umbria, but it was already destroyed in his time, and all clue to its position is lost.
