= Semibugry =

Semibugry Семибугры
- Selo
- Location within Astrakhan Oblast Location within Russia
- Coordinates: 46°09′N 48°15′E
- Country: Russia
- Region: Astrakhan Oblast
- District: Kamyzyaksky District
- Time zone: UTC+4:00

Semibugry (Russian: Семибугры) is a rural locality (a selo) and the administrative center of Semibugrinsky Selsoviet, Kamyzyaksky District, Astrakhan Oblast, Russia. The population was 1,778 as of 2010. There are 12 streets.

== Geography ==
It is located on the Bolda River, 29 km northeast of Kamyzyak (the district's administrative centre) by road. Chilimny is the nearest rural locality.
