= Peremyshl, Muscovy =

Coordinates: 55.3611°N 37.4056°E

Peremyshl (Russian: Перемышль) was a town in the Grand Duchy of Moscow located on the right bank of the Mocha River, within the Troitsky Administrative Okrug of Moscow, to the west of the Dmitrovo village.

By the site of Peremyshl, there is the Rodnevo hill fort. Both sites ("городище Перемышль Московский" and "Родневское городище) are archaeological monuments of federal importance.

Historian Vasily Tatishchev claimed that the Peremyshl fortress was founded in 1152. However a 1339 document by Ivan Kalita refers to Peremyshl as a village. On the other hand, it as suggested that the fortifications existed in 1370. At the time it belonged to Serpukhov udel (appanage) of the Grand Duchy of Moscow.
