= Ny Varberg =

Abandoned town in Sweden

Coordinates: 57.1408°N 12.2647°E

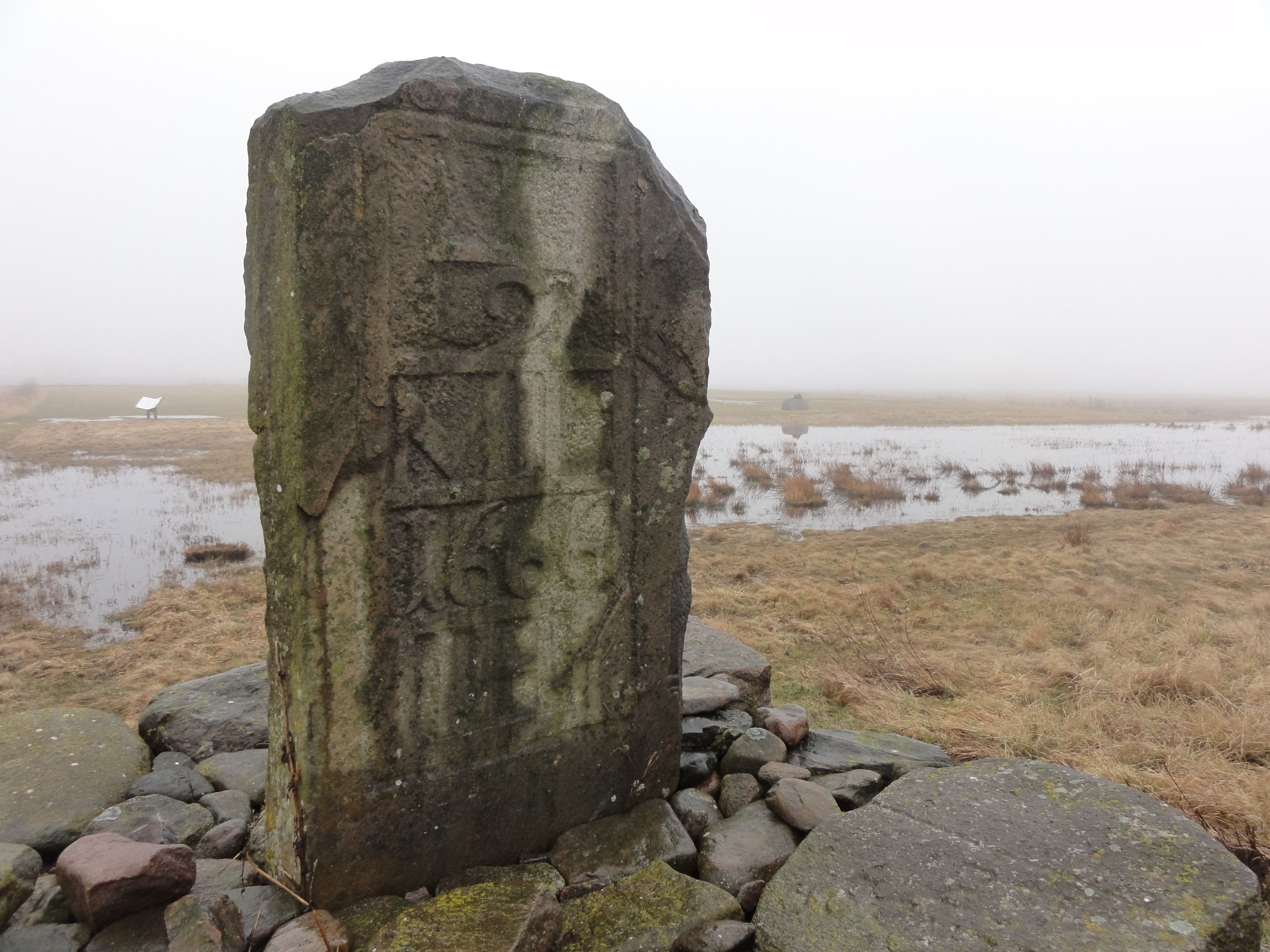
Ny Varberg

Ny Varberg (New Varberg) was a city founded sometime between 1429 and 1434 about five kilometres north of present-day Varberg, Sweden. It was abandoned around 1612. The city was located at a crossroads where the roads from Småland and Västergötland met the royal road through Halland. To have access to the sea, a canal 700 metres long was built between Kattegat and Himleån. It is unclear who founded the city or why.

Just outside the city there was (until 1525) a Carmelite monastery, as well as a chapel and a hospital. The city's area grew from less than 6000 m^{2} during the 15th century to 12000 m^{2} at the beginning of the 17th century.

From the middle of the 16th century and onwards the city suffered devastation on many occasions. In 1545 a major fire broke out, and large parts of the city were destroyed during the Northern Seven Years' War. Through support from the Danish state and attempts at forced resettlement, a phase of reconstruction was begun at the end of the 16th century. However, another fire broke out in 1597 and during the Kalmar War the city was so ravaged that king Christian IV of Denmark decided to move the city to its present-day location.

== Sources ==
- Varberg - en kommuns historia, Varbergs kommun, 1993. Varberg: Carlssons Boktryckeri AB. ISBN 91-630-1470-X
