= Astrakhan State University =

University in Astrakhan, Russia

Astrakhan Tatishchev State University
- Астраханский государственный университет
- Established: 1932
- Rector: Igor A. Alekseev
- Location: 20a Tatischev Str. Astrakhan, Russia; 46.3774°N 48.0531°E
- Website: Building details

University rankings

Regional – Overall
- QS Emerging Europe and Central Asia: 401-450 (2022)

Astrakhan Tatishchev State University (formerly Astrakhan State Pedagogical University) is a university located in Astrakhan, Russian Federation. It was founded in 1932.

The traditional functions of Astrakhan Tatishchev State University include training specialists and fundamental research, as well as offering education to foreign students and sharing new technologies with industry and business.

ASU in figures:

- 6 Institutions;
- 21 Departments;
- 82 Chairs;
- More than 40 research institutions, centers, and laboratories;
- More than 100 specialties to train students;
- 57 research specialties for PhD courses;
- 11 thesis councils;
- More than 16,000 students (including more than 4000 foreigners);
- 600 postgraduate students (including 23 foreigners);
- 10 university buildings for studies;
- 6 comfortable hostels;
- 37 computer centers with Internet access.

ASU has been chosen by Harvard University (USA) as a pilot site in Russia to organize an educational program in international competitiveness.
