= Rus' Khaganate =

Hypothetical 8th–9th century polity in Eastern Europe

Rus' Khaganate (Note: (Russian: Русский каганат, Russkiy kaganat, Ukrainian: Руський каганат, Ruśkyj kahanat)) or Kaganate of Rus (Note: "The use of the title chacanus by the ruler of the Rus has led scholars to call the organization he headed the "kaganate of Rus". The correctness of such a designation may be disputed. The term kaganate is organically connected with the political organizations of Asiatic people, the nomads, and to give the same name to an organization of immigrant Germanic people from the North seems hardly suitable.") is a name applied by some modern historians to a hypothetical polity suggested to have existed during a poorly documented period in the history of Eastern Europe between c. 830 and the 890s. (Note: "At the far southeastern end of the European continent, the Khazar Kaganate and the stability it had created within its large sphere of influence began to break down. A violent civil war took place during the 820s, and although the kaganate's strength was restored a decade later, certain results of the conflict would have serious implications for the future. The losers of the internal political struggle, known as Kabars, fled northward to the Varangian Rusʹ in the upper Volga region, near Rostov, and southward to the Magyars, who formerly had been loyal vassals of the Khazars. The presence of Kabar political refugees from Khazaria among the Varangian traders in Rostov helped to raise the latter's prestige, with the consequence that by the 830s a new power center known as the Rusʹ Kaganate had come into existence. The acceptance of the Kabar rebels by the Magyars, however, turned the latter into the enemies of the new rulers of Khazaria.")

The fact that a few sparse contemporaneous sources appear to refer to the leader or leaders of Rus' people at this time with the word chacanus, which might be derived from the title of khagan as used by groupings of Eurasian Turkic nomads, has led some scholars to suggest that his political organisation can be called a "k(h)aganate". Other scholars have disputed this, as it would have been unlikely for an organisation of Germanic immigrants from the north to adopt such a foreign title. Some historians have criticised the concept of a Rus' Khaganate, calling it a "historiographical phantom", and said that the society of 9th-century Rusʹ cannot be characterised as a state. Still other scholars identify these early mentions of a Rus' political entity headed by a chacanus with the Kievan Rus' state commonly attested in later sources, (Note: Duczko (2004): "The word Rhos-Ros [in the Annales Bertiniani] is equal to the term ar-Rus of the Arab sources, and the name of the first state of the eastern Slavs, the Kievan State.") whose princes such as Vladimir the Great (r. 980–1015), Yaroslav the Wise (r. 1019–1054), and perhaps Sviatoslav II of Kiev (r. 1073–1076) and Oleg I of Chernigov (r. 1097–1115) were occasionally identified as kagans in Old East Slavic literature until the late 12th century.

== Mentions in documents ==
=== Overview ===
The word khagan for a leader of some groups of Rus' people is mentioned in several historical sources. According to Constantin Zuckerman (2000), these sources are divided into two chronological groups: three or four Latin and Arabic sources from c. 839 to c. 880 (which he labelled "1a, 1b, 1c"), while three Old East Slavic sources (labelled "2a, 2b, 2c") date from 200 years later in the 11th and 12th centuries, and are "fundamentally different". The Perso-Arabic (Islamic) sources mentioning a khāqān rus or Khāqān-i Rus all appear to follow a single common chain of tradition tracing back to the "Anonymous Note".

- (1a) The Latin Annales Bertiniani or "Annals of St. Bertin" (this part written by Prudentius of Troyes, who died in 861) mention certain men called Rhos, whose king (rex) they called chacanus or Chacanus, visiting Frankish emperor Louis the Pious in Ingelheim in 839.

"[...] Misit etiam cum eis quosdam, qui se, id est gentem suam, Rhos vocari dicebant, quos rex illorum, Chacanus vocabulo, ad se amicitiae, sicut asserebant, causā direxerat, petens per memoratam epistolam, quatenus benignitate imperatoris redeundi facultatem atque auxilium per imperium suum totum habere possent, quoniam itinera per quae ad illum Constantinopolim venerant, inter barbaras et nimiae feritatis gentes immanissimas habuerant, quibus eos, ne forte periculum inciderent, redire noluit. Quorum adventūs causam imperator diligentius investigans, comperit eos gentis esse Sueonum, exploratores potius regni illius nostrique quam amicitiae petitores ratus, penes se eo usque retinendos judicavit, quod veraciter invenire posset, utrum fideliter eo necne pervenerint; [...]"
"[...] He also sent with the envoys some men who said they – meaning their whole people [gens] – were called Russians and had been sent to him by their king whose name was the Khagan for the sake of friendship, so they claimed. Theophilus requested in his letter that the Emperor in his goodness might grant them safe conducts to travel through his empire and any help or practical assistance they needed to return home, for the route by which they had reached Constantinople had taken them through primitive tribes that were very fierce and savage and Theophilus did not wish them to return that way in case some disaster befell them. When the Emperor investigated more closely the reason for their coming here, he discovered that they belonged to the people of the Swedes. He suspected that they had really been sent as spies to this kingdom of ours rather than as seekers of our friendship, so he decided to keep them with him until he could find out for certain whether or not they had come in good faith. [...]"

- (1b) The Latin Chronicon Salernitanum or "Salerno Chronicle" (anonymous 10th-century chronicle) reports of a diplomatic dispute in 871 between Carolingian emperor Louis the German and Byzantine emperor Basil I, in which Basil (in a letter now lost) appears to have claimed that chaganus is a title used amongst the Avars, Khazars and Normans; Louis replies he has heard of an Avar caganum, but never of Khazar or Norman ones:

"[...] Chaganum vero nos [sic] praelatum Avarum, non Gazanorum aut Nortmannorum nuncupari repperimus, neque principem Vulgarum, set regem vel dominum Vulgarum. [...]"
"But we have found that the leader (praelatus) of the Avars is called Khagan (chaganum), but not (non) the leader of the Gazani or the Northmen, nor (neque) the prince of the Bulgars but (the latter is called) king or lord of the Bulgars."

- (1c) The Arabic "Anonymous Note" dating from c. 870–880, (Note: '...the Arabic description of Eastern Europe used by some Eastern geographers. This source, called the "Anonymous Note" by the Polish orientalist Tadeusz Lewicki, dates back to 870–880.') which was reused by a number of Arabic and Persian writers, including the following:
  - Ahmad ibn Rustah wrote c. 903–913 (or c. 920) in an Arabic-language book that the Rus' had a prince called khāqān rus or Khaqan-Rus.
  - Hudud al-'Alam (anonymous late-10th-century Persian-language geography text) refers to the Rus' king as "Khāqān-i Rus".
  - Abu Saʿīd Gardīzī (died 1061), Zayn al-Akhbār (11th century), also referred to "Khāqān-i Rus".
- (2a) Hilarion of Kiev's 11th-century Sermon on Law and Grace mentions the title of kagan five times, and applies it to Volodimir I (Vladimir/Volodymyr "the Great") r. 980–1015), and his son Georgij, baptismal name of Yaroslav the Wise (r. 1019–1054).
- (2b) A short inscription on the wall of Saint Sophia Cathedral, Kyiv expresses a plea for divine deliverance for the (unnamed) "our kagan", possibly prince Sviatoslav II of Kiev (r. 1073–1076): "G-d, save our Kagan" (Church Slavonic: съпаси Ги҃ каг[а]на нашего, romanized: Sŭpasi g[ospod]i kag[a]na nashego; Russian: Спаси Г[оспод]и каг[а]на нашего, romanized: Spasi g[ospod]i kag[a]na nashego).
- (2c) The Tale of Igor's Campaign (12th century) calls Oleg I of Chernigov a kogan. According to Donald Ostrowski (2018), 'the word kogan is referring to a specific ruler or just to a time when there were khagans.'

=== Annales Bertiniani sub anno 839 ===
The earliest claimed reference related to Rus' people ruled by a "khagan" comes from the Frankish Latin Annales Bertiniani, which refer to a group of Norsemen who called themselves Rhos (qui se, id est gentem suam, Rhos vocari dicebant) and visited Constantinople, capital of the Byzantine Empire, around 839. Fearful of returning home via the steppes, which would leave them vulnerable to attacks by the Magyars, these Rhos travelled through the Frankish kingdom accompanied by Byzantine Greek ambassadors from the Byzantine Emperor Theophilus. When questioned by the Frankish king Louis the Pious at Ingelheim, they stated that their leader was known as chacanus (hypothesized to be either the Latin word for "khagan" or a deformation of Scandinavian proper name Håkan), (Note: A minority of scholars believe that the reference was to a king bearing the Old Norse name Håkan or Haakon, including Garipzanov (2006) and Ostrowski (2018).) that they lived far to the north, and that they were Swedes (comperit eos gentis esse sueonum).

=== Chronicon Salernitanum ===
Thirty years later, in spring 871, the eastern and western Roman Emperors, Basil I and Louis II of Italy, quarrelled over control of Bari, which had been besieged by Arabs. The Byzantine Emperor sent an angry letter to his western counterpart, reprimanding him for usurping the title of emperor. He argued that the Frankish rulers are simple reges, while the imperial title properly applied only to the overlord of the Romans, that is, to Basil himself. He also pointed out that each nation has its own title for the supreme ruler: for instance, the title of chaganus is used by the overlords of the Avars (Avari), Khazars (Gazari), and "Northmen" (Nortmanni). To that, Louis replied that he was aware only of the Avar khagans, and had never heard of the khagans of the Khazars and Normans. The content of Basil's letter, now lost, is reconstructed from Louis's reply, quoted in full in the Chronicon Salernitanum ("Salerno Chronicle"). According to Dolger, it indicates that at least one group of Scandinavians had a ruler who called himself "khagan", but Ostrowski (2018) countered: 'The letter of Louis II to Basil I states specifically that the Northmen do not have a khagan. From that, the non-extant letter of Basil I has been thought to have stated that the Northmen had a khagan, but we do not know that. (...) Besides, even if Basil's letter did assert that the ruler of the Northmen was called a khagan, that testimony is negated by the statement of Louis II that their ruler is not called a khagan.'

=== Arabic-Persian sources ===
Ahmad ibn Rustah, a 10th-century Persian Muslim geographer, wrote that the Rus' khagan ("khāqān rus") lived on an island in a lake. Constantin Zuckerman comments that Ibn Rustah, using the text of the Anonymous Note from the 870s, attempted to accurately convey the titles of all rulers described by its author, which makes his evidence all the more invaluable. Ibn Rustah mentions only two khagans in his treatise—those of Khazaria and Rus.

Hudud al-'Alam, an anonymous geography text written in Persian during the late 10th century (c. 982–983), refers to the Rus' king as "Khāqān-i Rus". The unknown author of Hudud al-Alam relied on several 9th-century and 10th-century sources. Abu Said Gardizi, an 11th-century Persian Muslim geographer, mentioned "khāqān-i rus" in his work Zayn al-Akhbār. Ibn Rustah, the Hudud al-Alam and Gardizi all copied their information from the same late 9th-century source.

Zuckerman (2000) argued that Ya'qubi, Kitab al-Buldan ("The Book of Countries", c. 889–890), also has a relevant passage. In a legendary story about a siege of the Tsanars in the Caucasus in 854, mention is made of "the overlords (sahib) of the Byzantines (al-Rum), of the Khazars, and of the Slavs (al-Saqaliba)", which Zuckerman connected with a supposed Rus' khagan. According to Zuckerman, Ibn Khordadbeh and other Arab authors often confused the terms Rus and Saqaliba when describing Caspian expeditions of the Rusʹ in the 9th and 10th centuries. But Ibn Khordādbeh's Book of Roads and Kingdoms does not mention the title of "khagan" for the ruler of Rus'.

=== Old East Slavic sources ===
The three later Old East Slavic sources mentioning a kagan (Hilarion of Kiev's 11th-century Sermon on Law and Grace, and the 11th-century Saint Sophia Cathedral, Kyiv inscription) or kogan (the 12th-century The Tale of Igor's Campaign) have generally been understood to refer to the ruler of Kievan Rus'. According to Halperin (1987), the title kagan in the Annales Bertiniani sub anno 839, Hilarion's Sermon, and in The Tale of Igor's Campaign all apply to "the ruler of Kiev". He agreed with Peter B. Golden (1982) that this reflected Khazar influence on Kievan Rus', and argued that the use of a "steppe title" in Kiev 'may be the only case of the title's use by a non-nomadic people'. Halperin also found it "highly anomalous" that a Christian prelate like Hilarion would 'laud his ruler with a shamanist title', adding in 2022: "The Christian ethos of the sermon is marred by Ilarion's attribution to Vladimir of the Khazar title kagan, which was definitely not Christian."

Hilarion's Sermon on Law and Grace mentions the word kagan (Old East Slavic: каганъ, romanized: kaganŭ) throughout the text, a total of five times.

1. и похвала каганоу нашемоу влодимероу, ѿ негоже крещени быхом ("And: an encomium to our kagan Volodimer, by whom we were baptized.")
2. великааго кагана нашеа земли Володимера, вънука старааго Игоря, сына же славнааго Святослава ("the great kagan of our land Volodimer, the grandson of Igor' of old, and the son of the glorious Svjatoslav.")
3. каганъ нашь Влодимеръ ("Volodimer, our kagan")
4. Съвлѣче же ся убо каганъ нашь и съ ризами ветъхааго человѣка ("So our kagan cast off his clothing")
5. Паче же помолися о сынѣ твоемь, благовѣрнѣмь каганѣ нашемь Георгии ("And furthermore, pray for your son, our devout kagan, Georgij";). Georgij was the baptismal name of Yaroslav the Wise, who reigned in Kiev at the time and was Hilarion's patron.

A colophon preserved in a 15th-century manuscript, at the end of a set of works usually attributed to Hilarion, adds one more mention: Быша же си въ лѣто 6559 (1051), владычествующу благовѣрьному кагану Ярославу, сыну Владимирю. Аминь. ("These things came to pass in the year 6559 (1051), during the reign of the pious kagan Jaroslav, the son to Volodimer, Amen.")

=== Absence in other contemporary sources ===
The absence of any khagan in the following sources has been taken by several scholars as evidence indicating either that there had never been a Rus' khaganate (Tolochko 2015, Ostrowski 2018), or that it must have disappeared by 911 (Zuckerman 2000), probably already before 900 (Golden 1982).

- The Book of Roads and Kingdoms (c. 870) written by Persian geographer Ibn Khordadbeh does mention the Rus' as important traders, but does not mention a title of a Rus' ruler in his chapter "Titles of the rulers of the Earth", where only the Turks, Tibetans and Khazars are said to be ruled by khaqans. If the Rus' had a khaqan at the time, the author would have been expected to mention it, but he did not. Ibn Khordadbeh's book is a notable exception amongst the Arabic-Persian sources in mentioning the Rus', but not a khaqan; more generally, his information also does not appear to stem from the same source (possibly the now-lost book written by Jayhani) used by others such as Ibn Rusta and Gardizi.
- The Primary Chronicle (an anonymous Rus' chronicle completed c. 1110) does not mention the title of khagan anywhere, for example in the three Rus'-Byzantine treaties of 907, 911, and 944.
- The Risala of Ahmad ibn Fadlan (written in Arabic, documenting his visit to Kievan Rus' around 922) calls the monarch of the Rus' a malik (Arabic for "king"), not a qagan, even though it does say that 'the king of the Khazars [is] called a Qagan'.
- De Ceremoniis (a Greek book on ceremonial protocol at the Byzantine court from the 950s) meticulously documents the titles of foreign rulers, but when it deals with Olga of Kiev's reception at the court Constantine VII in 945, it does not call her a khagan, but an archon (Greek for "ruler").

== Dating ==
The dating of the Khaganate's existence has been the subject of debates among scholars and remains unclear. Paul Robert Magocsi and Omeljan Pritsak date the foundation of the Khaganate to be around the year 830. According to Magocsi, "A violent civil war took place during the 820s. ... The losers of the internal political struggle, known as Kabars, fled northward to the Varangian Rus' in the upper Volga region, near Rostov, and southward to the Magyars, who formerly had been loyal vassals of the Khazars. The presence of Kabar political refugees from Khazaria among the Varangian traders in Rostov helped to raise the latter's prestige, with the consequence that by the 830s a new power center known as the Rus' Kaganate had come into existence." Whatever the accuracy of such estimates may be, there are no primary sources mentioning the Rus' or its khagans prior to the 830s. Omeljan Pritsak noted that the leader of those Kabars was Khan-Tuvan.

Golden (1982) and Zuckerman (2000) concluded that if a Rus' khaganate had existed, it must have disappeared before 900, as references to a Rus' khagan are last recorded in the 880s, and do not return until the 11th century. Various possible reasons for its disappearance have been suggested. The Primary Chronicle describes the uprising of the pagan Slavs and Chudes (Baltic Finns) against the Varangians, who had to withdraw overseas in 862. The Novgorod First Chronicle, whose account of the events Shakhmatov considered more trustworthy, does not pinpoint the pre-Rurikid uprising to any specific date. The 16th-century Nikon Chronicle attributes the banishment of the Varangians from the country to Vadim the Bold. The Ukrainian historian Mykhailo Braychevskiy labelled Vadim's rebellion "a pagan reaction" against the Christianization of the Rus'. A period of unrest and anarchy followed, dated by Zuckerman to c. 875–900. The absence of coin hoards from the 880s and 890s suggests that the Volga trade route ceased functioning, precipitating "the first silver crisis in Europe".

After this economic depression and period of political upheaval, the region experienced a resurgence beginning in around 900. Zuckerman associates this recovery with the arrival of Rurik and his men, who turned their attention from the Volga to the Dnieper, for reasons as yet uncertain. The Scandinavian settlements in Ladoga and Novgorod revived and started to grow rapidly. During the first decade of the 10th century, a large trade outpost was formed on the Dnieper in Gnezdovo, near modern Smolensk. Another Dnieper settlement, Kiev, developed into an important urban centre roughly in the same period.

== Possible locations ==
The location of the purported khaganate, more specifically the residence of the supposed khagan, has been actively disputed since the late 19th century. Sites proposed by scholars have included the following:

- The Middle Dnieper including Kiev (Kyiv): Mykhailo Hrushevsky (1904, the Kievan khagan being Slavic), Alexander Vasiliev (1946, the Kievan khagan being Varangian-Swedish), Boris Rybakov, (Note: Rybakov believed that the title "kagan" was borrowed by the Slavs as early as the sixth century from the Avar Khanate.) Lev Gumilev, Mikhail Artamonov (1940, the Kievan khagan being Slavic), Alexander V. Riasanovsky (1962, the Kievan khagan being Slavic), Anatoly Novoseltsev, Aleksandr Nazarenko, Anton Gorsky, Charles J. Halperin (1987).
- The Lower Dnieper near the Black Sea: Vasilii G. Vasil’evskii (1915; the khagan being Khazar).
- The Sea of Azov (Tmutarakan): George Vernadsky (1940).
- "Southern Rus'": Julius Brutzkus (1935, the khagan being Khazar).
- the Middle Don and the Siverskyi Donets basin: E. S. Galkina (2002).
- The interfluve of the Middle Don and the upper Oka to the Middle Dnieper: Valentin Sedov, Peter Benjamin Golden.
- The Upper Volga region: Simon Franklin & Jonathan Shepard (1996, one of 4 options).
  - Rostov: Paul Robert Magocsi (2010), Lawrence N. Langer (2021, one of 3 options).
- The Volkhov river region: Aleksey Shakhmatov, Sergey Platonov, Vasily Bartold, Omeljan Pritsak, Constantin Zuckerman, Dmitry Machinsky, Elena Alexandrovna Melnikova.
  - Rurikovo Gorodische (Holmgard) near Veliky Novgorod: Jonathan Shepard (1995), Simon Franklin & Jonathan Shepard (1996, one of 4 options), Lawrence N. Langer (2021, one of 3 options).
  - Lake Ilmen: Iurii Vladimirovich Got'e (1915), Imre Boba (1968).
  - Staraya Ladoga (Aldeigjuborg): Simon Franklin & Jonathan Shepard (1996, one of 4 options), Lawrence N. Langer (2021, one of 3 options).
  - Staraya Russa.
- The land of the Chud: Ernst Kunik (1844).
- East Sweden (Birka): Simon Franklin & Jonathan Shepard (1996, one of 4 options), Ildar Garipzanov (2006, it was an (East) Swedish kongur named Håkan who may have operated in North Rus', but without permanent residence)
- Nowhere: Oleksiy Tolochko (2015), (Note: '[Tolochko] expressed skepticism about the existence of a Rus' khaganate at all, remarking that its location has been a "moving target" in the historiography, one that is "elusive and inconstant." To the question "Where was the Rus' khaganate located," his somewhat sardonic answer was only "in the pages of learned treatises."') Donald Ostrowski (2018). (Note: Ostrowski summarised that Chacanus was the Swedish personal name Håkan and thus that the Annales Bertiniani cannot support the existence of a Rus' khagan or khaganate in 839, that the letter of Louis II the German of 871 is ambiguous and does not point clearly in favour or against Northmen khagan, that the earliest Arabic-Persian source (Ibn Khordadbeh) does not mention a Rus' khaqan and does not consider the Rus' to be an ethnos/tribe but merchants, and that the later Rus' sources from the 10th to the 12th centuries are too late and 'should not be used as evidence for a Rus' khagan or khaganate in the 830s.' He concluded: '[N]one of our sources testifies to (...) the existence of [a Rus' khaganate] in the first half of the ninth century'.)

=== Kiev ===
Soviet historiography, as represented by Boris Rybakov and Lev Gumilev, advanced Kiev as the residence of the khagan, assuming that Askold and Dir were the only khagans recorded by name. Mikhail Artamonov became an adherent of the theory that Kiev was the seat of the Rus' Khaganate, and continued to hold this view into the 1990s. Halperin (1987) also stated that the 839 Annales Bertiniani reference to a Rus' chacanus is to "the ruler of Kiev". Some archaeologists have countered that there is no material evidence of a Norse presence in Kiev prior to the 10th century. Troublesome is the absence of hoards of coins which would prove that the Dnieper trade route – the backbone of later Kievan Rus' – was operating in the 9th century. Based on his examination of the archaeological evidence, Zuckerman concludes that Kiev originated as a fortress on the Khazar border with Levedia and that only after the Magyars departed for the west in 889 did the middle Dnieper region start to progress economically.

=== Volkhov river sites ===
A number of historians, the first of whom was Vasily Bartold, have advocated a more northerly position for the khaganate. They have tended to emphasize ibn Rustah's report as the only historical clue to the location of the khagan's residence. Recent archaeological research, conducted by Anatoly Kirpichnikov and Dmitry Machinsky, has raised the possibility that this polity was based on a group of settlements along the Volkhov River, including Ladoga, Lyubsha, Duboviki, Alaborg, and Holmgard (modern Rurikovo Gorodische). "Most of these were initially small sites, probably not much more than stations for re-fitting and resupply, providing an opportunity for exchange and the redistribution of items passing along the river and caravan routes". If the anonymous traveller quoted by ibn Rustah is to be believed, the Rus of the Khaganate period made extensive use of the Volga route to trade with the Near East, possibly through Bulgar and Khazar intermediaries. His description of the Rus' island suggests that their center was at Holmgard, an early medieval precursor of Novgorod whose name translates from Old Norse as "the river-island castle". The First Novgorod Chronicle describes unrest in Novgorod before Rurik was invited to come to rule the region in the 860s. This account prompted Johannes Brøndsted to assert that Holmgard-Novgorod was the khaganate's capital for several decades prior to the appearance of Rurik, including the time of the Byzantine embassy in 839. (Note: For a detailed analysis of recent archaeological investigations at Holmgard, see Duczko 2004 102–104.) Machinsky accepts this theory but notes that, before the rise of Holmgard-Novgorod, the chief political and economic centre of the area was located at Aldeigja-Ladoga. However, Nosov (1990) stated that archaeological evidence recovered at Rurikovo Gorodische puts the terminus post quem for the hill-fort's establishment decades later: dendrochronological analysis showed that trees used in construction at the site were felled between the years 889 and 948, and radiocarbon dating of charcoal samples collected from a ditch at the site of "Holmgard" trace back to 880(±20).

=== Islands in fringe theories ===
According to one fringe theory, the Rus' khagan resided somewhere in Scandinavia or even as far west as Walcheren. In stark contrast, George Vernadsky believed that the khagan had his headquarters in the eastern part of the Crimea or in the Taman Peninsula and that the island described by Ibn Rustah was most likely situated in the estuary of the Kuban River. Neither of these theories has won many adherents, as archaeologists have uncovered no traces of a Slavic-Norse settlement in the Crimea region in the 9th century and there are no Norse sources documenting "khagans" in Scandinavia.

== Etymological issues ==
=== Rhos and Rus' ===
The Russian anti-Normanist Stepan Gedeonov (1876) was the first historian to suggest that the Rhos ambassadors mentioned in the Annales Bertiniani sub anno 839 were Swedes in the diplomatic service of a Rusʹ (Rhos) khagan (chacanus), and thus that there was Rus' khaganate, and that these Rus' people were Slavic. Danish linguist Vilhelm Thomsen (1877) instead concluded "that Rhos was the Greek designation for the Scandinavians or Northmen, who in this case happened to be Swedes." According to Ukrainian historian Mykhailo Hrushevsky (1904), the Rhos envoys were "northern Germanic", but in the service of a "Rus' khagan", that was to be identified as the Slavic Rus' prince of Kiev. Vasil’evskii (1915) thought the Rhos were an indigenous people living near the mouth of the Dnieper into the Black Sea, and that the khagan was their Khazar master. Still others presume a Rus' khagan reigning over a state, or a cluster of city-states, set up by Rus' people somewhere in what is today European Russia and Ukraine as a chronological predecessor to the Rurik dynasty and Kievan Rusʹ. The region's population at that time was composed of Slavs, Turkic, Baltic, Finnic, Hungarian and Norse peoples. The region was also a place of operations for Varangians, eastern Scandinavian adventurers, merchants, and pirates.

Although since the 19th century various writers (some expressing anti-Normanist views) have asserted the Rus' (Rhos) mentioned in the Annales Bertiniani and the other sources possibly mentioning a Rus' khagan were Slavic, the modern scholarly consensus is that the Rus' people originated in Scandinavia, possibly Sweden. According to the prevalent theory, the name Rus', like the Proto-Finnic name for Sweden (*Ruotsi), is derived from an Old Norse term for "the men who row" (rods-) as rowing was the main method of navigating the rivers of Eastern Europe, and that it could be linked to the Swedish coastal area of Roslagen (Rus-law) or Roden, as it was known in earlier times. The name Rus' would then have the same origin as the Finnish and Estonian names for Sweden: Ruotsi and Rootsi.

Around 860, a group of Rus' Vikings began to rule the area under their leader Rurik. Gradually, Norse warlords, known to the Turkic-speaking steppe peoples as "köl-beki" or "lake-princes", came to dominate some of the region's Finno-Ugric and Slavic peoples, particularly along the Volga trade route linking the Baltic Sea with the Caspian Sea and Serkland. According to Franklin & Shepard (1996, 2014), the account of the 860s Rus' expedition against Constantinople in the Primary Chronicle (which claims the raid originated in Kiev) was largely borrowed by the authors from a 10th-century Greek source, the Continuation of the Chronicle of George the Monk, which does not identify a point of departure.

=== Chacanus ===
Since the 18th century, the debate on the word chacanus / Chacanus in the Annales Bertiniani has had two sides: it must either be understood as the title of the rex, namely khagan (first proposed by Siegfried Bayer in 1736), or that it was a Scandinavian proper name, namely Håkon (first suggested by Stroube de Piermont in 1785). In 2004, Duczko stated: 'At present there is almost total unity of opinion that the title of the ruler of Rus is of Khazarian origin and that the word chacanus is a Latin form of the Turk word khagan, a title of a prime ruler in the nomadic societies in Eurasia.' He claimed that the Old Norse personal name interpretation 'was abandoned (though its supporters still appear from time to time).' Garipzanov (2006) challenged the khagan interpretation again, arguing that one cannot just turn the c in the middle of chacanus into a g, adding that 'many Germanic names starting with phonetic h- were transcribed in Frankish sources with ch-', and concluding that the word most likely was the Swedish name Håkan, an explanation accepted by Ostrowski (2018).

Assuming it reflects the Khazar-derived title khagan, there is considerable dispute over the circumstances of this borrowing. Peter Benjamin Golden (1982) rejected the idea that the Rus' could have appropriated the title of Qağan from the Khazars; the ruling Ashina clan would have had to voluntarily appoint a Rus' leader as a vassal Qağan for it to have any legitimacy. Golden concluded that the Rus' Khaganate was a puppet state set up by the Khazars in the basin of the Oka River to fend off recurring attacks of the Magyars. However, no source records that the Rus' of the 9th century were subjects of the Khazars. For foreign observers (such as Ibn Rustah), there was no material difference between the titles of the Khazar and Rus' rulers. Anatoly Novoseltsev hypothesizes that the adoption of the title "khagan" was designed to advertise the Rus' claims to equality with the Khazars. This theory is echoed by Thomas Noonan, who asserts that the Rus' leaders were loosely unified under the rule of one of the "sea-kings" in the early 9th century, and that this "High King" adopted the title "khagan" to give him legitimacy in the eyes of his subjects and neighboring states. According to this theory, the title was a sign that the bearers ruled under a divine mandate.

Omeljan Pritsak speculated that a Khazar khagan named Khan-Tuvan Dyggvi, exiled after losing an internecine war, settled with his Kabar faction in the Norse-Slavic settlement of Rostov, married into the local Scandinavian nobility, and fathered the dynasty of the Rus' khagans. Zuckerman dismisses Pritsak's theory as untenable speculation, (Note: Archaeologists did not find traces of a settlement in Rostov prior to the 970s. Furthermore, the placename "Rostov" has a transparent Slavic etymology.) and no record of any Khazar khagan fleeing to find refuge among the Rus' exists in contemporaneous sources. Nevertheless, the possible Khazar connection to early Rus' monarchs is supported by the use of a stylized trident tamga, or seal, by later Rus' rulers such as Sviatoslav I of Kiev; similar tamgas are found in ruins that are definitively Khazar in origin. The genealogical connection between the 9th-century Khagans of Rus' and the later Rurikid rulers, if any, is unknown at this time. (Note: But see, e.g., Duczko 31–32, outlining theories that Rurik held the title of Khagan Rus'.)

== See also ==
- Arthania
- Rus' invasion of Byzantium (860)
- Caspian expeditions of the Rusʹ
- Garðaríki

== Bibliography ==
- Ahmed ibn Fadlan. Ibn Fadlan's Journey to Russia: A Tenth-Century Traveler from Baghdad to the Volga River. Frye, Richard Nelson, ed. and trans. Princeton, NJ: Markus Wiener Publishers, 2005.
- Ahmad ibn Umar ibn Rustah. al-Alaq al-nafisah: Maruf bih Ibn Rustah. Tarjamah va taliq-i Husayn Qarah'chanlu. Tehran, Iran: Amir Kabir, 1986.
- Александров, А.А. (1997). Остров руссов [The Rus' Island]. St. Petersburg-Kishinev. (Aleksandrov)
- Artamanov, M.I. "Prevye Stranisky Russkoy Istorii ve Archeologicheskom Osveshchenii." Sovietskaya Arkheologica. Vol 3, 1990. pp. 271–290.
- Waitz, Georg, ed. (1883), Annales Bertiniani, Scriptores rerum Germanicarum (Monumenta Germaniae Historica), vol. 5, Hannover: Impensis bibliopolii Hahniani
- Braychevskiy, Mykhailo Yulianovych (1989). Утверждение христианства на Руси [Establishment of Christianity in Rus'] (PDF) (in Russian). Kiev: Naukova dumka. p. 183.
- Brøndsted, Johannes (1965). The Vikings. Translated by Kalle Skov. Penguin Books.
- Brook, Kevin Alan (2006). The Jews of Khazaria. Second Edition. Rowman and Littlefield. p. 352. ISBN 9781442203020.
- Brutzkus, Julius. "The Khazar Origin of Ancient Kiev." Slavonic and East European Review, 22 (1944).
- Christian, David. A History of Russia, Mongolia and Central Asia. Blackwell, 1999.
- Dolger F. Regesten der Kaiserurkunden des ostromischen Reiches. I. Berlin, 1924.
- Dolukhanov, Pavel Markovich (1996). The Early Slavs: Eastern Europe from the Initial Settlement to the Kievan Rus. Pearson education print on demand edition. London: Longman. p. 187. ISBN 9780582236189.
- Duczko, Władysław (2004). Viking Rus: Studies on the Presence of Scandinavians in Eastern Europe. Leiden: Brill. p. 290. ISBN 9789004138742.
- Franklin, Simon (1991). "Ilarion's "Sermon on Law and Grace"". Sermons and Rhetoric of Kievan Rus' (PDF). University of Toronto (SLA 218 Ukrainian Literature and Culture). p. 30.
- Franklin, Simon; Shepard, Jonathan (2014). The Emergence of Rus 750–1200. London: Longman. p. 472. ISBN 9781317872245. (2014 Routledge reprint of 1996 Longman original)
- Garipzanov, Ildar (2006). The Annals of St. Bertin and the Chacanus of the Rhos. University of Bergen.
- Golden, Peter Benjamin. "Rus." Encyclopaedia of Islam Eds.: P. Bearman, Th. Bianquis, C.E. Bosworth, E. van Donzel and W.P. Heinrichs. Brill. Brill Online, 2006
- Golden, Peter Benjamin (1982). "The Question of the Rus' Qaganate". Archivum Eurasiae Medii Aevi. 2: 77–97.
- Halperin, Charles J. (1987). Russia and the Golden Horde: The Mongol Impact on Medieval Russian History. p. 222. ISBN 9781850430575. (e-book).
- Halperin, Charles J. (2022). The Rise and Demise of the Myth of the Rus' Land (PDF). Leeds: Arc Humanities Press. p. 107. ISBN 9781802700565.
- Jones, Gwyn (2001). A History of the Vikings. Oxford: Oxford University Press. p. 504. ISBN 9780192801340. (first published 1968, second edition 1984, reissued 2001)
- Laurent, J. and M. Canard. L'Armenie entre Byzance et l'Islam depuis la conquete arabe jusqu'en 886. Lisbon, 1980.
- Мачинский (Machinskiy) Д.А. "О месте Северной Руси в процессе сложения Древнерусского государства и европейской культурной общности." [On the Place of Northern Rus in the Genesis of the Old Rus' State and European Cultural Continuum]. Археологическое исследование Новгородской земли. Leningrad, 1984.
- Minorsky, Vladimir (1937). Hudud al-'Alam, The Regions of the World A Persian Geography, 372 A.H. - 982 A.D. translated and explained by V. Minorsky (PDF). London: Luzac & Co. p. 546. (§ 44. Discourse on the Rūs Country and its Towns).
- "Monumenta Germaniae Historica, Epistolae VII". Epistolae Karolini aevi V. Berlin: W. Henze, 1928.
- Noonan, Thomas. "The Khazar Qaghanate and Its Impact On the Early Rus' State: The translatio imperii from Itil to Kiev." Nomads in the Sedentary World, Anatoly Mikhailovich Khazanov and Andre Wink, eds. p. 76–102. Richmond, England: Curzon, 2001. ISBN 0-7007-1370-0.
- Noonan, Thomas. "The First Major Silver Crisis in Russia and the Baltic, ca. 875–900". Hikuin, 11 (1985): 41–50.
- Noonan, Thomas. "Fluctuations in Islamic Trade with Eastern Europe during the Viking Age". Harvard Ukrainian Studies, 1992, No.16.
- Noonan, Thomas. "The Monetary System of Kiev in the Pre-Mongol Period". Harvard Ukrainian Studies, 1987, No.11. Page 396.
- Новосельцев (Novoselʹcev) А.П. et al. Древнерусское государство и его международное значение. [Old Rus' State And Its International Relations]. Moscow, 1965.
- Новосельцев (Novoselʹcev) А.П. "К вопросу об одном из древнейших титулов русского князя". [On One of the Oldest Titles of the Rus' Princes]. История СССР. – 1982. – Вып. 4.
- Ostrowski, Donald (2018). "The Return of the Rhos". Canadian-American Slavic Studie. 52 (2–3): 290–311. doi:10.1163/22102396-05202009. S2CID 195449155.
- Pritsak, Omeljan. The Origin of Rus'. Cambridge Mass.: Harvard University Press, 1991.
- Pritsak, Omeljan. The Origins of the Old Rus' Weights and Monetary Systems. Cambridge, MA: Harvard Ukrainian Research Institute, 1998.
- Smirnov, Pavlo (1928). Волзький шлях і стародавні руси Нариси з руської історії VI — IX вв. (Volzʹkyĭ shli︠a︡kh i starodavni Rusy: narysy z rusʹkoï istoriï VI-IX vv) [The Volga route and the ancient Rus'. Essays on Rus' history VI-IX centuries] (in Ukrainian). Kyiv: Ukrainian Academy of Sciences. p. 228.
- Theophanes Continuatus, Ioannes Cameniata, Symeon Magister, Georgius Monachus. Ed. I. Becker. Bonnae, 1838 (CSHB), pp. 342–343.
- Vernadsky, G.V. A History of Russia. Vol. 1. Yale University Press, 1943 (Russian version online)
- Vernadsky, G.V., ed. A Source Book for Russian History from Early Times to 1917, Vol. 1. New Haven: Yale Univ. Press, 1972.
- Yanin, Valentin. Денежно-весовые системы русского средневековья. Домонгольский период. [The Monetary Systems of the Russian Middle Ages. The Pre-Mongol Period]. Moscow, 1956.
- Zuckerman, Constantin (2000). "Deux étapes de la formation de l'ancien état russe". Les centres proto-urbains russes entre Scandinavie, Byzance et Orient: Actes du Colloque International tenu au Collège de France en octobre 1997. éd. M. Kazanski, A. Nersessian et C. Zuckerman (Réalités Byzantines 7). Paris.
  - (2003 Russian translation online).
- Zuckerman, Constantin (1997). "Les Hongrois au Pays de Lebedia: une nouvelle puissance aux confins de Byzance et de la Khazarie en 836–889". Byzantium at War (9th–12th Century) (in French). Athens: National Research Foundation.
