= Tsanars =

Caucasian people

Tsanars (Note: Also spelled Ts'anars, Canars; Ancient Greek: Σαναροι, romanized: Sanaroi; Alanic: Tselkan; Armenian: Ծանար(ք), romanized: Tsanar(k'); Arabic: صنار, romanized: Ṣanār; Georgian: წანარი, romanized: ts'anari) were a Caucasian people who are mentioned in Arabic texts of the eight-to-tenth centuries AD. They originally lived near Darial Gorge north of Tbilisi but expanded to Kakheti. In the ninth and tenth centuries, Tsanars migrated to regions near Shakki around passes connecting Kakheti with Dagestan.

== Nomenclature ==
Pliny the Elder in first century AD named Tsanars Sanaroi (Σαναροι). The Armenian name Tsanar(k') (Ծանար(ք)) is found in the seventh-century work Ashkharhatsuyts, according to which, the Alans called Tsanars Tselkan. The same name is found in the tenth-century Georgian chronicle Conversion of Kartli which mentions the Tselkans, Pkhovelians, Mtiulians and Tchartalians (inhabitants of Chartalis-Khevi River, a tributary of the Aragvi). In the tenth-century Arabic work Hudud al-'Alam, Tsanars are named Ṣanār (صنار).

The name may be present in the ethnonymy and toponymy of the Central Caucasus. According to German scientist Julius Klaproth, the Ossetians called the Mokhevians Tsona, and the region spanning Darial Gorge to Kobi Sona-Sena. in 1970, Russian historian and caucasologist Nataliya Volkova recorded the Ossetian name for Kazbek as Sæna (Сæна) in the village of Kobi. The Kabardian name for Svans, and sometimes the entire population south of the Cross Pass, is sonē (сонэ). It is possible these names are comparable to the ethnonym Tsanars.

== Contemporaneous documentation ==
=== Early mentions ===
Tsanars were known to Ptolemy. Pliny the Elder mentioned Tsanars (Σαναροι) in the first century as a people who occupied Darial Gorge and the territory to the south. The seventh-century work Ashkharhatsuyts mentions Tsanars as Tsanar(k') (Ծանար(ք)), the neighbours of Tushs and Dvals, and on whose land were the mountain passes of Alans and Tselkans.

=== Arab invasions ===
In Muslim historiography, stories about unrest among the Tsanars have been preserved. According to Arab authors like al-Ya'qubi, the warlike mountaineers Tsanars became especially active in the second half of the eighth and early ninth centuries. Their frequent rebellions worried the Arab administration of Arminiya.

According to the story of eighth-century historian Al-Baladhuri, Yazid ibn Asid marched to the Bāb al-Lān (Gates of Alans) and defeated rebelling Tsanars, afterwards imposing kharaj ('land tax') on them. Historians Mikhail Artamonov and Aram Ter-Ghevondyan relate this battle and other events to the first period of the reign of Yazid ibn Asid in Arminiya (c. 752 – 754). This dating is dismissed by Arsen Shaginyan who notes in the story of Al-Baladhuri, the battle happened "when al-Mansur became the caliph".

According to the story of al-Ya'qubi, Amr ibn Ismail arrived at the request of the ruler of Arminiya and led a 20,000-strong army against Tsanars, killing 16,000 of them in one day and moving to Tbilisi. He also mentions under the rule of al-'Abbas ibn Zufar al-Hilali, who was appointed by Harun al-Rashid, Tsanars again rebelled. According to the story Kitabul Futuh by Ibn A'tham al-Kufi, al-Hasan ibn Qahtab led a 30,000-strong army against Tsanars, killing 10,000 of them. He then marched on and conquered the rebellious inhabitants of Javakhit (Javakheti).

After the death of Ishaq ibn Isma'il, Abbasid commander Bugha al-Kabir conducted a military campaign against Ishaq's allies the Tsanars. The Georgian Chronicles says Bugha's army was 120,000-strong. Tsanars were effective against his troops, defeating him multiple times in short succession. Bugha fought Tsanars either sixteen or nineteen times in nine days, and his repeated losses were humiliating. According to Tovma Artsruni, after the losses, Bugha invaded Caucasian Albania.

Tovma Artsruni does not mention any outside help but according to Ya'qubi, Tsanars requested help against Bugha from Byzantines, Khazars and the Saqāliba (Slavs). (Note: Historian Josef Markwart considers this the earliest mention of a Slavic State in history.) Faced with this army, Bugha wrote to al-Mutawakkil, who sent Muhammad ibn Khalid al-Shaybani as governor over the north. This calmed Tsanars enough to seek peace. Joseph Laurent and Marius Canard note their main goal was to maintain the Kura River as a territorial divide. Later allies of Tsanars indicate they were involved in power struggles between groups of Arabs in the north. Al-Yaqubi confirms their good connections to other non-Georgian, both Christian and non-Christian, ethnic groups of the Caucasus and beyond.

== Ethnicity and localization ==
Historians debate the ethnicity of Tsanars. Historians Vladimir Minorsky, Anatoly Novoseltsev and others connect them with the Vainakhs (Chechens and Ingush). (Note: Novoseltsev 1990, p. 107 (see the citation 94 on p. 156), referring to Minorsky 1963, p. 211; Novoseltsev, Pashuto & Cherepnin 1972, p. 40.) Georgian historians Sargis Kakabadze, Mariam Lortkipanidze and others connect them with the Svans or with Georgians in general. Historian Givi Tsulaya disagrees the ethnicity of Tsanars is debatable, saying this point of view is "too categorical to be accepted unconditionally". According to Tsulaya, the Tsanars were an ethnic group of Eastern Georgia. According to the 8th century Arab historian Masudi, the Tsanars, though Christians, "claim to be descended from the Arabs, namely from Nizār b. Maʿadd b. Muḍar, and a branch (fakhdh) of ʿUqayl, settled there since olden times".

Vladimir Minorsky dismisses this claim, stating the Tsanars "certainly had nothing to do with Arab tribes". Commenting to Hudud al-'Alam, Vasily Bartold suggested a genetic connection of Tsanars with North Dagestanis. Russian historian and caucasologist Nataliya Volkova dismisses versions precisely attributing Tsanars to Vainakhs, Dagestanis or Georgians due to the lack of direct evidence of the linguistic affiliation. Based on the ethnic situation in this region in the ancient and early medieval periods, it could be assumed the Tsanars were an Ibero-Caucasian speaking group. The Tsanars later gradually merged with the Georgians.

Historians also debate the territory of the Tsanars, who were mostly localized in Kakheti (Georgia) and Shakki (Caucasian Albania). Al-Masudi places them between Tbilisi and Bāb al-Lān (modern day Darial Gorge) Apparently referring to al-Masudi, the anonymous author of Hudud al-'Alam places Tsanars between Tbilisi and Shaki; the length of their country is measured as 20 farsakhs. (Note: Farsakh—measure of length, varying depending on the area from 6 to 8 km (3.7 to 5.0 mi).) According to the Darband-nāmeh, they lived in Jurzān, a term that usually refers to Kartli (Georgia). Historian Cyril Toumanoff notes the word Ṣanāriya "was used by Arabs to designate Kaxetia in general ... In Georgian sources, on the other hand, the Canars are encountered only in the narrow sense of the term". Vladimir Minorsky said Tsanars originally inhabited Darial Gorge but later expanded eastwards into Kakheti. In the ninth and tenth centuries, the centres of Tsanars moved eastwards to the region near Shakki and the passes connecting Kakheti with Dagestan

== Sources ==
- Dunlop, D. M. (1960). "Bāb al-Lān". In Gibb, H. A. R.; Kramers, J. H.; Lévi-Provençal, E.; Schacht, J.; Lewis, B. & Pellat, Ch. (eds.). The Encyclopaedia of Islam, Second Edition. Volume I: A–B. Leiden: E. J. Brill. OCLC 495469456.
- Kuznetsov, V. A. (1984). Golieva, A. T. (ed.). Очерки истории алан [Essays on the history of Alans] (in Russian). Ordzhonikidze: Ir. pp. 1–303.
- Minorsky, V. F (1953). "Caucasica IV". BSOAS. xv (3). London: SOAS: 504–529. doi:10.1017/S0041977X00111462.
- Minorsky, V. F (March 1958). A History of Sharvān and Darband in the 10th-11th Centuries. Cambridge: W. Heffer & Sons Ltd. pp. 1–187.
- Minorsky, V. F (1963). История Ширвана и Дербенда [History of Shirvan and Derbend] (in Russian). Moscow: Izd-vo vost. lit. pp. 1–266.
- Novoseltsev, A. P.; Pashuto, V. T.; Cherepnin, L. V. (1972). Пути развития феодализма (Закавказье, Средняя Азия, Русь, Прибалтика) [Paths of development of feudalism (Transcaucasia, Central Asia, Rus', Baltic states)] (PDF) (in Russian). Moscow: Nauka. pp. 1–336.
- Novoseltsev, A. P. (1990). Хазарское государство и его роль в истории Восточной Европы и Кавказа [The Khazar state and its role in the history of Eastern Europe and the Caucasus] (in Russian). Moscow: Nauka. pp. 1–264. ISBN 9785020095526.
- Rapp, S. H. Jr (2003). Studies in Medieval Georgian Historiography: Early Texts and Eurasian. Corpus scriptoru / Corpus scriptorum christianorum orientalium / Subsidia. Vol. 5, 113. Leuven: Peeters Publishers. pp. 1–522. ISBN 9789042913189. ISSN 0070-0444.
- Shaginyan, A. K. (2008a). "Армения и Арминийа в составе 'Аббасидского Халифата во второй половине VIII и в начале IX в." [Armenia and Arminiya as part of the Abbasid Caliphate in the second half of the 8th and early 9th centuries]. Vestnik SPBU (in Russian) (3). SPb.: SPBU: 75–91. ISSN 1812-9323.
- Shaginyan, A. K. (2008b). "Последнее восстание в Арабской провинции Арминийа (850–855 гг.)" [The last uprising in the Arab province of Arminiya (850–855)]. Vestnik SPBU (in Russian) (4–1). SPb.: SPBU: 108–117. ISSN 1812-9323.
- Tuallagov, A. A. (2018). "Дарьял - "ворота алан"" [Darial - The Gates of Alans]. Izv. SOIGSI (in Russian). 27 (66). Vladikavkaz: SOIGSI: 15–29. ISSN 2223-165X.
- Tsulaya, G. V. (1986). "Перевод, введение и примечания" [Translation, introduction and notes]. In Dzidziguri, V.; et al. (eds.). Джуаншер Джуаншериани: Жизнь Вахтанга Горгасала [Juansher Juansheriani: The Life of Vakhtang Gorgasal] (PDF). Pamyatniki Gruzinskoy istor. lit. (in Russian). Vol. 6. Tbilisi: Mentsiereba.
- Vacca, A. M. (2017-11-15). "Conflict and Community in the Medieval Caucasus". Al-ʿUṣūr al-Wusṭā. 25 (1). New York City: Columbia University: 66–112. doi:10.7916/alusur.v25i1.6999. ISSN 1068-1051.
- Volkova, N. G. (1973). Lavrov, L. I.; et al. (eds.). Этнонимы и племенные названия Северного Кавказа [Ethnonyms and tribal names of the North Caucasus] (in Russian). Moscow: Nauka. pp. 1–210.
