= Lyubsha =

Coordinates: 60.0000°N 32.3167°E

For the Ukrainian military facility, see Lyubsha (air base).

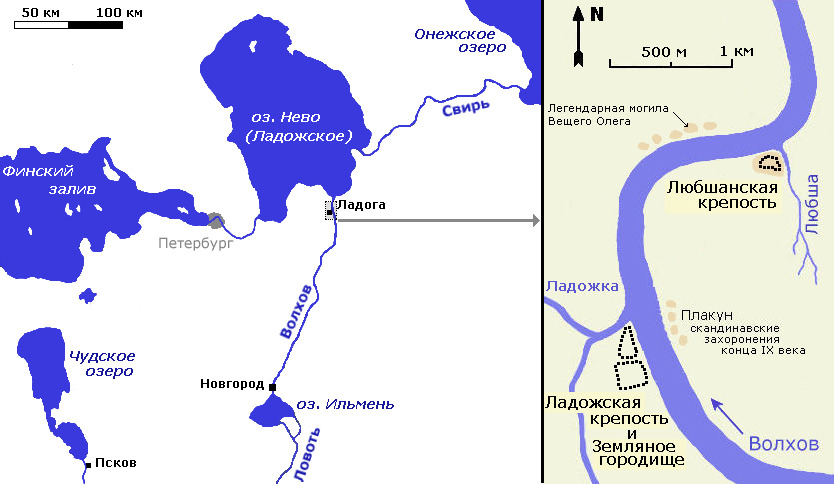
Volhov, Lyubsha and Ladozhka rivers (map on right) Lake Ladoga (on the left).

Lyubsha (Russian: Любша) is an archaeological site situated on the right bank of the Volkhov, about 1,500 metres downstream from Staraya Ladoga. As was determined by the 1997 excavations, Lyubsha is the site of one of the oldest Slavic fort in Russia, established in the first half of the 8th century, thus predating Ladoga. Its layout and dimensions closely resemble the contemporaneous hill forts of Great Moravia.

The fortress was destroyed by fire towards the end of the 9th century. Constantine Zuckerman connects its destruction with a conflict (Vadim's uprising) that marked the downfall of the Rus' Khaganate. The Norse name of Lyubsha is unknown.

Immediately north of Lyubsha lies the village of Gorchakovshchina, which used to be a trading post at the head of navigation on the Volkhov, near its ancient entry into Lake Ladoga. Dmitry Machinsky ranks it, along with Ladoga and Alaborg, among the most important centres of the khaganate.
