= Sychyov =

Sychyov, Sychov or Sychev (Russian: Сычёв) is a Russian surname derived from the word сыч (sych, meaning "small owl"). Its female form is Sychyova (Russian: Сычёвa). People bearing this name are:

- Alexander Sychyov (1903–1978), Soviet Major, Hero of the Soviet Union (1943)
- Alexander (Daniil) Sychyov (born 1960), monk of the Russian Orthodox Church
- Aleksandr Sychyov (born 1959), retired field hockey player from Russia
- Andrey (Nil) Sychyov (born 1964), Bishop of the Russian Orthodox Church
- Andrey Sychyov (born 1986), former Russian soldier
- Dmitri Sychyov (1972–2010), the Mayor of Melitopol
- Dmitri Sychev (born 1983), Russian football player
- Ivan Sychyov (1911–1945), lieutenant, the recipient of the Order of the Patriotic War, 2nd class
- Nikolai Sychov, Soviet and Russian art historian
- Leonid Sychov, ballet dancer
- Sergei Sychyov (born 1977), Ukrainian ice dancer who also competed for Estonia
- Stanislav Sychov (1937–2003), Ukrainian painter
- Vladimir Sychyov (born 1945), Soviet and French photographer
- Vladimir Sychyov (born 1962), Soviet and Russian footballer and football coach
- Vladimir Sychyov (1924–2016), Soviet and Russian scientist in the field of aerodynamics
- Vladimir Sychyov (born 1971), Soviet and Russian actor
- Vladimir Sychyov (1935–2014), Soviet and Russian swimming coach, honored coach of the USSR
- Vladimir Sychyov (1917–1995), Soviet and Russian sculptor
