= Campaign of Bugha al-Kabir in Caucasus =

Campaign of Bugha al-Kabir in the Caucasus
- Part of the Arab campaigns in the Caucasus
Date	853 – early 854
Location	Darial Gorge, southern slopes of the Greater Caucasus (present-day border of Russia and Georgia)
Result	Inconclusive (Note: The Tsanars defeated Bugha's army in the field, but the Abbasids captured Tbilisi and secured control over the Darial Pass.)

Belligerents
Tsanars	Abbasid Caliphate

Commanders and leaders
Unknown Tsanar commander	Bugha al-Kabir

Strength
Unknown	~120,000 (according to medieval sources)

Casualties and losses
Unknown	Heavy

The campaign of Bugha al-Kabir in the Caucasus was fought in 853 – early 854 between the Tsanars (Sanars), a warlike Caucasian people inhabiting the area around the Darial Pass, and the army of the Abbasid Caliphate under the Turkic general Bugha al-Kabir (also known as Bugha al-Turki).

== Background ==
In 852, a rebellion broke out in Armīniya (the Abbasid province in the Caucasus), resulting in the assassination of the Caliph's governor. Caliph al-Mutawakkil (r. 847–861) dispatched a large punitive expedition under Bugha al-Kabir to subdue the region and restore Caliphal authority.

In August 853, Bugha captured and burned Tbilisi, executing its emir, Isḥāq b. Ismāʿīl. He then advanced northward into the mountains to punish the Tsanars, who were allies of the defeated emir and had long resisted Arab rule.

== The campaign ==
As Bugha's army advanced through the Darial Gorge—the main pass connecting the North and South Caucasus—the Tsanars ambushed them in the narrow defile. According to the 9th-century Arab historian al-Ya'qubi, Bugha was defeated by the Sanars (Tsanars). The Armenian historian Tovma Artsruni adds that the Tsanars repulsed the invading army nineteen times over nine days.

However, despite this tactical defeat, Bugha later managed to negotiate with the inhabitants of the mountainous region of Mituleti, who agreed to submit and gave 300 hostages, allowing the Abbasids to secure the Darial Pass. Harsh winter conditions and heavy snowfall contributed to the Tsanars' initial success but also hampered both sides.

== Aftermath ==
Bugha withdrew to Armenia but did not launch another campaign specifically against the Tsanars. The Caliphate had achieved its primary goal: the capture of Tbilisi and the reassertion of control over the strategic Darial route. Nevertheless, the Tsanars preserved their autonomy in their mountain strongholds. By the 10th century, they gradually merged with neighboring Georgian and Nakh-speaking peoples.

== Historical significance ==
This campaign is regarded as one of the most significant episodes in Tsanar history. The tribe left its name in the historic region of Tsanareti (Georgian: წანარეთი) and is considered one of the ancestral groups of the modern Ingush and Chechen peoples.
