= Machinsky =

Machinsky (also Matchinsky, Matschinski), feminine: Machinskaya is a Russified form of the Polish surname Macziński. Notable people with the surname include:

- Dmitry Machinsky (Дмитрий Алексеевич Мачинский, 1937–2012), a Russian archaeologist.
- Francis C. "Moose" Machinsky (1934–2014), an American gridiron football player;
