= Leo Klejn =

Russian archaeologist (1927–2019)

- Лев Клейн
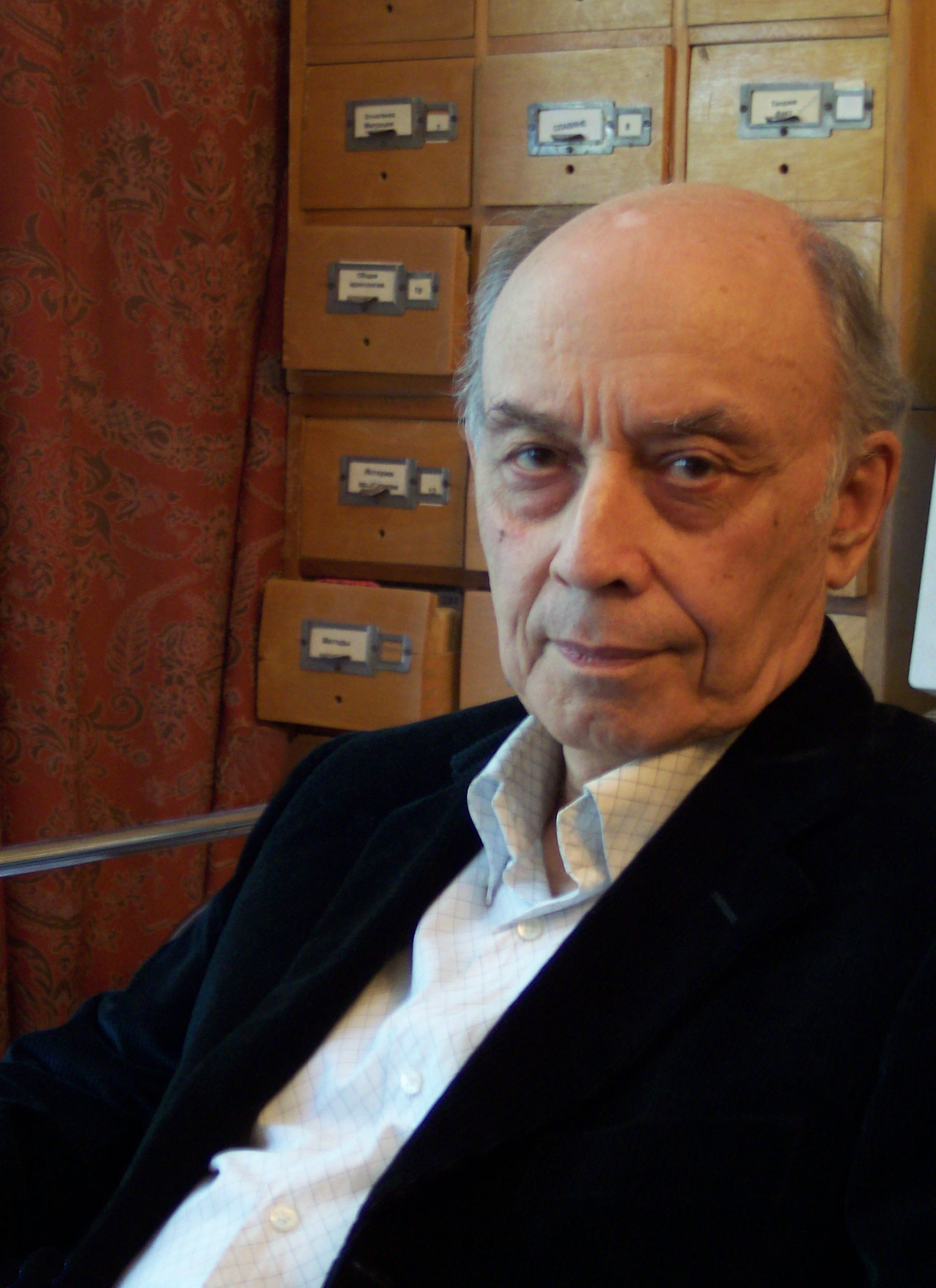
- Klejn in 2008
- Born: 1 July 1927; Vitebsk, Byelorussian SSR, Soviet Union (now Belarus)
- Died: 7 November 2019 (aged 92); Saint Petersburg, Russia
- Education: Leningrad State University
- Scientific career
- Fields: Archaeology, anthropology, philology
- Workplaces: Leningrad State University; European University at Saint Petersburg

Lev Samuilovich Kleyn (Russian: Лев Самуилович Клейн; 1 July 1927 – 7 November 2019), better known in English as Leo Klejn and Leo S. Klein, was a Russian archaeologist, anthropologist and philologist.

== Early life ==
Klejn was born in Vitebsk, Belarus, to two Jewish physicians, Polish-born Stanislav Semenovich Kleyn (originally Samuil Simkhovich) and Asya Moiseyevna nee Rafalson (Russian: Рафальсон). Both of Klejn's grandparents were wealthy: one a factory owner, the other a highly ranked merchant. Stanislav Kleyn served as a medical officer in the anti-Bolshevik Volunteer Army during the Russian Civil War. By the end of the war he had joined the Red Army, but was never a member of the Communist Party.

In 1941, both of Klejn's parents were drafted to serve in World War II, while the rest of the family were evacuated, first to Volokolamsk and then Yegoryevsk near Moscow, and then to Yoshkar-Ola in the Mari ASSR. There, Klejn worked on a collective farm before leaving school at the age of 16 and being attached to the 3rd Belorussian Front as a civilian. After the war, the family settled in Grodno, and Klejn studied for a year at a Railway Technical School.

While still in high school, Klejn created an underground liberal organisation called 'Prometheus'. This drew the attention of the KGB, but owing to the age of those involved, there were no serious consequences.

== Career ==
Upon graduating high school, Klejn entered the Grodno Pedagogical Institute in the Faculty of Language and History. In 1947, after a year there, he spoke against the First Secretary of Grodno's Party Committee at a conference and was forced to leave. He transferred to Leningrad State University, first as a corresponding student, and then full-time. At Leningrad he studied both archaeology under Mikhail Artamonov and Russian philology under Vladimir Propp. While there he continued to act contrary to Party dogma by reading a paper criticising the work of Nicholas Marr. Klejn escaped expulsion for this, however, as shortly thereafter Marr's theories were denounced by Stalin himself. Graduating with honours from the Faculty of History in 1951, Klejn worked as a librarian and high school teacher for six years before returning to Leningrad for postgraduate studies in archaeology. He began working in the Department of Archaeology in 1960 and became an assistant professor there in 1962. This was unusual as Klejn was a Jew and not a member of the Party, but he was appointed to the position by a special session of the faculty's Party Bureau on the strength of his academic qualifications. He was awarded a Candidate of Sciences degree (equivalent to a PhD) in 1968, defending a thesis on the origins of the Donets Catacomb culture. In 1976 he was made Docent (Associate Professor).

Klejn's first printed work was published in 1955; his first monograph in 1978. He participated in a series of archaeological fieldwork expeditions in Russia, Belarus and Ukraine, the last 5 seasons as head of the expedition. These included excavations of early Rus' towns and Bronze Age and Scytho-Sarmatian barrows.

=== Persecution ===
Klejn continued to chafe against the Party-backed academic establishment as a teacher. In the 1960s, he organised a series of seminars on the Varangian theory of the origins of the Kievan Rus' where he contradicted the anti-Normanist position. Then in the seventies he began working on theoretical problems in history and archaeology—a subject that had been completely neglected since Stalin's purges of academia in the 1930s—and found himself contradicting the orthodox Marxist theory of historical materialism. His frequent publication in foreign journals also caused alarm.

In the early 1970s Klejn's brother Boris, then teaching in a Grodno institute, was dismissed and stripped of his degree and title for speaking against the introduction of Soviet troops into Czechoslovakia. Then in 1981 Klejn himself was arrested for homosexuality on the orders of the KGB. During a search pornography was planted on him, but too crudely, and the court could not accept the evidence. Nevertheless, Klejn was convicted and imprisoned. The scholarly community, however, interpreted this as an attempt to get rid of a troublemaker rather than a genuine accusation and came to his defence. Klejn neither affirmed nor denied the charge, even after homosexuality was decriminalised, on the basis that an individual's sexual orientation is not the concern of society or the state. But in his account he relates a parallel "investigation" conducted by his fellow inmates (to determine his treatment) which concluded he was not a homosexual. Eventually the initial sentence was overturned by a higher court and commuted to eighteen months detention, which by this time Klejn had almost served. After his release Klejn, like his brother, was stripped of his degree and title. He recorded his prison experiences under the pen name Lev Samoylov in the journal Neva and in his own name in the book The World Turned Upside Down.

=== Later career ===
Klejn remained without an academic position for ten years following his release. Following perestroika he began publishing again and, in 1994, defended a new thesis and was awarded a Doctor of Sciences degree by unanimous vote. He co-founded the European University at St. Petersburg and taught there until his retirement in 1997 at the age of 70. Afterward, he was a visiting scholar at a number of institutions, including the Universities of West Berlin, Vienna, Durham, Copenhagen, Ljubljana, Turku, Tromse, Washington in Seattle and the Higher Anthropological School of Moldova. In 2001 he stopped teaching following treatment for cancer; but continued to research and publish. In his later years, wrote a column in the Troitsky Variant.

Klejn died on 7 November 2019 in Saint Petersburg at the age of 92.

== Work ==
A whole series of Klejn's books and articles on this subject are terminated by his Metaarchaeology of 2001 (in Russian Introduction to theoretical archaeology of 2004).

=== Theoretical archaeology ===
Klejn has been one of the world's leading writers on theoretical archaeology, a term he coined, since the 1970s. According to Klejn, archaeological theories are programs of information processing based on a particular explanatory idea. Additionally, theories become methodology by stipulating a set of standard techniques.

Klejn's elaboration of a special theory for archaeology went against the Soviet view that historical materialism was the only theoretical basis of the humanities. It also was in conflict with the traditional Soviet understanding of historical studies, which saw history as embracing all other humanistic and social scientific disciplines studying the past. According to Klejn, archaeology is not a sub-field of history nor "history armed with a spade", as an influential school of Russian archaeology maintained, but a source-studying discipline similar to forensic science in its methodology. It processes archaeological sources, and translates them into the language of history, and finally transfers them to the historian for their incorporation into a historical synthesis. Archaeology's typical questions are what, when, where, whence and how, whereas the historian's question is why – or from what cause.

Klejn places particular emphasis upon rigorous methods of interpretation, in order to guard against the manipulation of antiquities in the service of political aims. His 'echeloned archaeology' outlined three research procedures: empirical, deductive and problem-setting, each with a clear succession of stages of investigation, adjusted to different aims of research. His work on classification and typology in archaeology attempted to outline a strategy for producing classifications that are both useful and objectively valid. This 'systemic' approach, which has been influential in Russian archaeology, stressed that some initial knowledge about the material to be classified as a whole is necessary to construct a reliable system of classification, and therefore that the process must work 'backwards' (relative to the received procedure) from cultures to attributes.

== Selected bibliography ==
For a full bibliography (over 500 titles) see Archaeology.ru and to 2000 Arkheolog: Detectiv i myslitel' (Archaeologist: detective and thinker). Collection of studies devoted to 77th year of Lev Samuilovich Klejn (ed. by L. B. Vishniatsky, A. A. Kovalev, O. A. Schcheglova). S.Pb., publ. St.Petersburg University, 2004, 502 p. ISBN 5-288-03491-5.
