= Siege of Tbilisi (1122) =

Georgian conquest of Georgia's last Arab stronghold

- Part of the Georgian Crusade
Date	February 1122
Location	Tbilisi, Georgia
Result	Georgian victory
Territorial changes	Reclamation of Tbilisi by the Georgians

Belligerents
Kingdom of Georgia	Emirate of Tbilisi

Commanders and leaders
David IV	Unknown

The Siege of Tbilisi (Georgian: თბილისის შემოერთება, Tbilisis sh'emoerteba) in February 1122 was led by David IV, who successfully conquered the Emirate of Tbilisi, which had been established by the Arab conquests four centuries earlier. Having reclaimed Tbilisi, David's campaign marked the beginning of the end for Arab rule in Georgia; the Georgian army went on to retake the rest of the region and secured a critical victory in the Georgian–Seljuk wars. The collapse of the Emirate of Tbilisi also allowed the Kingdom of Georgia to contest territory within the rest of the weakening Seljuk Empire.

== Background ==
Georgia after the Umayyad invasion of Georgia.

The Emirate of Tbilisi was established in 736 following the Umayyad invasion of Georgia, which managed to occupy the city of Tbilisi and its environs from their previous holders, Principality of Iberia. The emirate was controlled by Arab dynasties throughout the next centuries despite unsuccessful Georgian attempts during the reign of King Bagrat IV to recapture its capital.

In 1062, Tbilisi became governed by its city council composed mostly of monks until it was recaptured by Alp Arslan six years later, during the Great Turkish Invasion. In 1080, the city council regained control in a period of weakened emirs' authority.

The defeat of the Seljuk Empire at the Battle of Didgori in August 1121 allowed King David IV to liberate the Caucasus from Muslim domination dating back several centuries. Georgia's enemies found themselves decisively defeated, preventing them from retaliating against the northern Christian advance, while the Crusades raged in the west of the Turkic world. However, there remains a last Islamic enclave within the Georgian kingdom, an enclave having lost all relations with other Muslim states since the start of King David's conquests.

== Siege ==
Already in June 1121, David IV had put the city of Tbilisi under siege but was content with a formal allegiance with an annual tribute, in view of the upcoming war against the Turkish invaders. Once the Seljuks were defeated, David focused on the capture of Tbilisi from the beginning of 1122. The city tried to resist, but the military strikes of Georgians were so strong that it was pointless to continue fighting. The siege also put the population in a difficult time. The rulers of Tbilisi decided to negotiate with the king, in which they sent ambassadors to David and asked for a truce, but the king's decision was unwavering - Tbilisi had to submit to the central government. David refused to negotiate with the ambassadors. After a short siege, in the middle of February 1122, the king, probably accompanied by general Ivane Orbeli, made a decisive attack and took the city.

== Aftermath ==
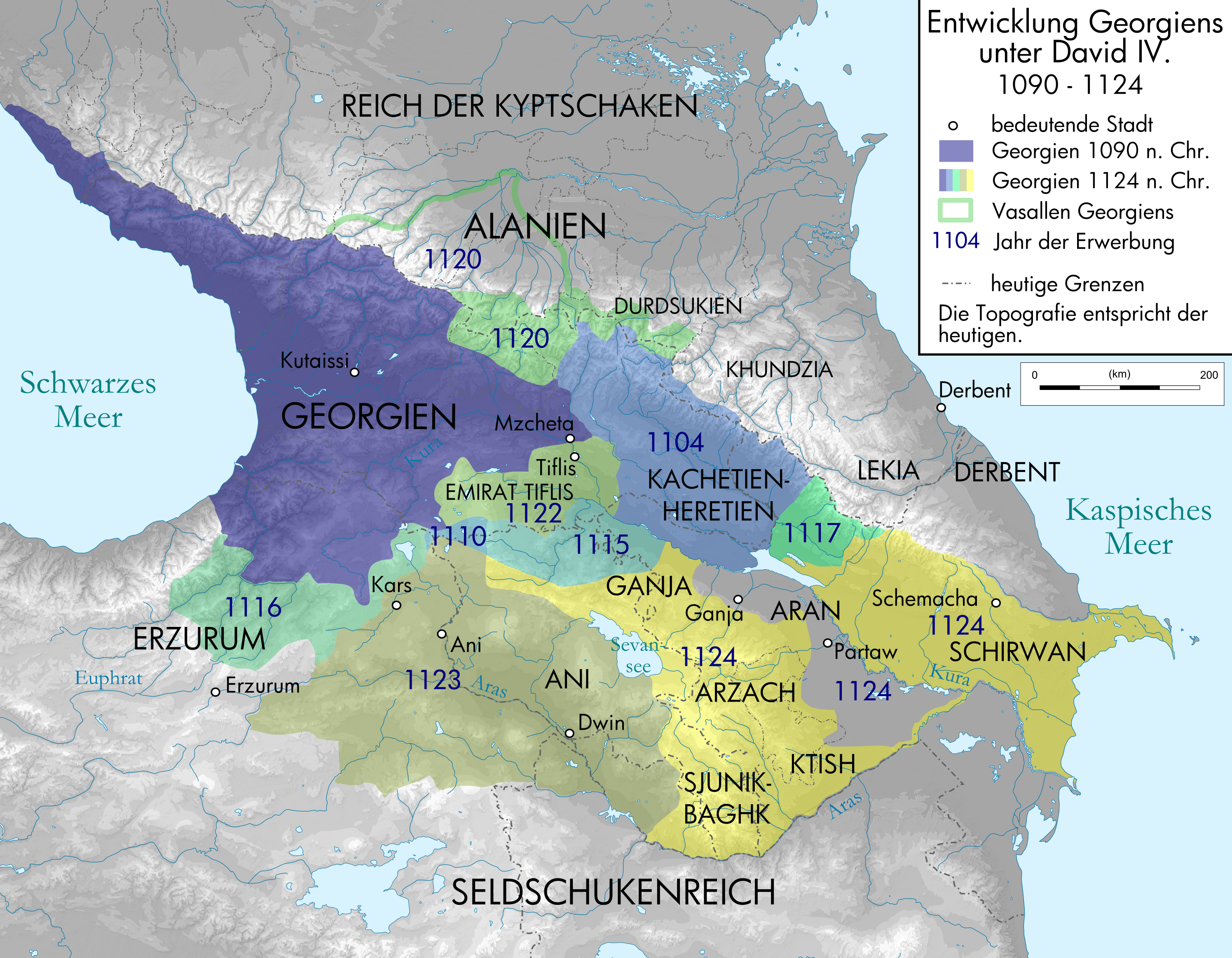
Expansion of Kingdom of Georgia under David IV's reign.

David showed great severity towards the population, in which he killed many, including 500 Arabs who were put on a spiked polearm and tortured to death, and devastated the mosques and other signs of the Islamization of the Georgian city, but soon calmed down. According to the 15th-century Arab historian Badr al-Din al-Ayni, who utilizes sources, some of which have not survived, admits that the city was pillaged but says that the Georgian king eventually showed patience and "respected the feelings of Muslims more than Muslim rulers had done before." A well-educated man, he preached tolerance and acceptance of other religions, abrogated taxes and services for the Muslims and Jews, and protected the Sufis and Muslim scholars.

Following the capture of the city, David moved the capital from Kutaisi to Tbilisi, thus restoring the latter to the status it had before the Arab conquest in the 7th century. The recovery of Tbilisi guarantees a cultural renewal in the city, whose Christian religious buildings are being enlarged. David also built several noble palaces and cultural centers, such as an important palace built especially to serve as a place of study and inspiration for Muslim poets. However, the situation in the city has not calmed down. During the following years, several bloody clashes between Muslims and Christians occurred, and even the royal power failed to calm inter-religious dissensions. At the same time, David IV decided to preserve some of the institutions of the former Emirate of Tbilisi. Thus, the post of emir was retained, but as governor of the city, until the 18th century.

Despite this conquest, the Muslim enclave, whose territory was greatly reduced following the loss of its administrative center, persisted in the middle of the Georgian kingdom. David IV finally decides to put an end to the existence of this State, just after having “settled the affairs of the country”. In March 1124, he managed to attack the last Muslim stronghold in Georgia, Dmanisi, which he took after a short fight, thus completing the unification of Georgia.

== Sources ==
- Pubblici, Lorenzo (2022). Mongol Caucasia: Invasions, Conquest, and Government of a Frontier Region in Thirteenth-Century Eurasia (1204-1295). Brill.
- Minorsky, Vladimir (1993). "Tiflis". In Houtsma, M. Th.; van Donzel, E.. E. J. Brill's First Encyclopaedia of Islam, 1913–1936. Brill. p. 755. ISBN 90-04-08265-4.
- Samushia, Jaba (2015). Illustrated history of Georgia. Tbilisi: Palitra L. ISBN 978-9941-21-755-5.
- Lortkipanidze, Mariam; Japaridze, Otar; Muskhelishvili, David; Metreveli, Roin (2012). History of Georgia in four volumes, vol. II - History of Georgia from the 4th century to the 13th century. Tbilisi: National Academy of Sciences of Georgia. ISBN 978-9941-19-585-3.
- Asatiani, Nodar; Janelidze, Otar (2009). History of Georgia. Tbilisi: Publishing House Petite. ISBN 978-9941-9063-6-7.
- Brosset, Marie-Félicité (1851). Additions et éclaircissements à l'histoire de la Géorgie depuis l'Antiquité jusqu'en 1469 de J.-C [Additions and clarifications to the history of Georgia from Antiquity to AD 1469] (in French). St.-Petersbourg: Imprimerie de l'Académie Impériale des Sciences.
- Brosset, Marie-Félicité (1849). Histoire de la Géorgie depuis l'Antiquité jusqu'au XIXe siècle. Volume I [History of Georgia from Ancient Times to the 19th Century, Volume 1] (in French). Saint-Petersburg: Imperial Academy of Sciences.
- Asatiani, Nodar; Bendianashvili, Alexandre (1997). Histoire de la Géorgie. Paris: L'Harmattan. ISBN 2-7384-6186-7.
