= IMARES =

The International MA in Russian and Eurasian Studies (IMARES, before 2008 - International MA in Russian Studies, IMARS) is an advanced graduate programme at the European University at St. Petersburg, Russia, for students who already hold a BA degree or its equivalent. The programme is taught in English and offers training and research opportunities as well as a first hand experience of getting a close feel for Russia and many other countries in a wider region. In 1997 this programme began as MA in Russian Studies.

IMARES provides training in the politics, economy, society, and history of Russia and neighbouring Eurasian states. It combines the highest standards of teaching in English by Russian and international faculty with the advantages of living in St. Petersburg, Russia's cultural capital. A separate teaching module on Empire and Islam is offered in Kazan, the city where Slavonic and Turkic civilisations meet.

== IMARES Curriculum ==
The following curriculum drawn up for 2012 can be given as an example of an IMARES curriculum. Each course consists of 14 lectures and 14 follow-up discussion sessions. All instruction is in English.

=== Spring semester ===
Division 1: Politics and Economy

- Politics and Property in Post-Socialist Space (delivered by Jessica Allina-Pisano)
- Regime Change in Post-Soviet Eurasia (delivered by Vladimir Gel’man)
- Post-Soviet Political Economy: Ukraine, Russia and Belarus (delivered by Alexei Pikulik)
- Russian Foreign Policy (delivered by Nikita Lomagin)
- The Political Economy of Energy in Eurasia (delivered by Yulia Vymyatnina)

Division 2: Society and History

- The Russian Empire: Sovereignty, Nationalism and Politics of Diversity (delivered by Alexander Semyonov)
- Russian Media, Culture and Society (delivered by Sergey Erofeev)
- Russian Political and Social History (delivered by Sergei Podbolotov)
- Teaching module in Kazan: Empire and Islam May 2012 (division “Society and History”)
- Ethnicity and Culture in Soviet and Post-Soviet Tatarstan (delivered by Sergey Erofeev)
- Imperial Histories, Eurasian Political and Intellectual Controversies (delivered by Marina Mogilner, Iliya Gerasimov)
- The Russian language course

=== Fall semester ===
Division 1: Politics and Economy

- Security Threats in Eurasia: Armed Conflicts, Terrorism and Extremism (delivered by Ekaterina Stepanova)
- Comparative Political and Economic Development after Communism (delivered by Alexei Pikulik)
- Central Asia States: Making, Breaking and Remaking (delivered by Darya Pushkina)
- Energy Security and Russian Politics (delivered by Nikita Lomagin)

Division 2: Society and History

- Russian Political and Social History (delivered by Sergei Podbolotov)
- Islam and Nationalism in Eurasia (delivered by Eduard Ponarin)
- Russian Media, Culture and Society (delivered by Sergey Erofeev)
- Doing Fieldwork in Russia (delivered by Anna Temkina and Elena Zdravomyslova)
- Siberia: An Introduction to the Region ( delivered by Evgenii Golovko)

== Faculty ==
Mikhail Dolbilov, Candidate of Sciences (History, Voronezh State University, 1996). Associate Professor, Department of History, EUSP. Co-author of Западные окраины Российской империи [The Western Borderlands of the Russian Empire](Moscow, 2006, with Aleksei Miller). Author of English-, Russian- and Polish-language articles on the 19th- and early 20th-century Russian history.

Vladimir Gel’man, Candidate of Sciences (Political Science, St. Petersburg State University, 1998). Professor, Department of Political Sciences and Sociology, EUSP. He was a visiting professor at Central European University, Budapest, the University of Texas at Austin, Moscow State Institute of International Relations (MGIMO) and research fellow at St. Anthony's College (Oxford), University of Essex, Harvard University, and Wissenschaftszentrum Berlin fur Sozialforschung. He is author and/or editor of sixteen books in Russian and in English, including Making and Breaking Democratic Transitions: The Comparative Politics of Russia's Regions (Rowman and Littlefield, 2003), Elites and Democratic Development in Russia (Routledge, 2003), and The Politics of Local Government in Russia (Rowman and Littlefield, 2004).

Evgenii Golovko, Candidate of Sciences (Linguistics, 1985; Institute for Linguistic Studies, Russian Academy of Sciences). Professor of the Department of Ethnology, European University at St Petersburg; Chair of the Department of the Languages of the Russian Federation, Institute for Linguistic Studies, Russian Academy of Sciences; Associate Professor at the Department of Philology, St Petersburg State University, and at the Institute for the Peoples of the North, the Hertzen Pedagogical University. Author of the books Russkie starozhily Sibiri: Sotsialnye i simvolicheskie aspekty samosoznanija (Russian Old-Settlers of Siberia: The Social and Symbolic Aspects of Self-Identification), 2004; in co-authorship with Nikolai Vakhtin and Peter Schweitzer; Sotsiolingvistika i sotsiologija jazyka (Sociolinguistics and the Sociology of Language), 2004, in co-authorship with Nikolai Vakhtin; of dictionaries, grammars, and articles (in Russian and English) on Native Siberian languages and on the social anthropology of Siberia and Alaska. In 1993-1996 and 1997-1998 Golovko conducted research at the University of Alaska Fairbanks.

Pavel Lyssakov, PhD (Literature, Columbia University). Director of International Programs and Development and part-time Professor at the Faculty of Political Science and Sociology. Editor and contributor, Cultural Studies (European University Press, 2006). Author of articles and papers on 19th- and 20th-century literature, which appeared in journals, such as Irish Slavonic Studies and Russkii Tekst, and in numerous conference volumes. Recipient of the Harriman Institute Certificate in Russian Studies (1995). He is co-director of the Cultural Studies Program at the EUSP and coordinator of the Russian Cultural Studies international network of Baltic universities sponsored by the Council of Ministers of the North-European Countries.

Sergei Podbolotov, PhD (History, Cambridge University, expected 2008), Candidate of Sciences (History, St. Petersburg State University). Adjunct Professor, Department of Political Sciences and Sociology, EUSP. Formerly an associate professor at the Department of History, St. Petersburg State University; author of articles on Russian right-wing political parties in the early 1900s.

Eduard D. Ponarin, PhD (Sociology, University of Michigan). Professor and chair, Department of Political Science and Sociology at EUSP. Graduated from the Department of Psychology of the Leningrad State University in 1986. Worked as a lecturer at the Leningrad Institute of Culture in 1988–1989. From 1989 through 1996, Eduard Ponarin was a graduate student at the University of Michigan where he received his PhD in sociology.

Anna Temkina, PhD (Social Sciences, Helsinki University). Professor, Department of Political Sciences and Sociology, EUSP. Co-director of the Gender Studies Program at EUSP. Visiting professor at the universities of Tampere, Helsinki, Joensuu, Minsk, Vilnius; instructor at more than 10 summer schools. Author of Russia in Transition: the Case of New Collective Actors and New Collective Actions (Helsinki, 1997) and of more than 100 research articles, reviews, reports and other publications in the field of gender studies and research on sexuality.

Vadim Volkov, PhD (Sociology, Cambridge University). Professor of Sociology at the Department of Political Science and Sociology at the European University in St. Petersburg (EUSP). In 1999–2001, he was Social Science Research Council/MacArthur Foundation Postdoctoral Fellow for the International Peace and Security Program. In 1998, he was a visiting professor at the University of Chicago, Department of History. Dr. Volkov received his PhD in sociology from the University of Cambridge in 1995 and Diploma of Higher Education from Leningrad State University, Faculty of Economics, in 1987. He is the author of Violent Entrepreneurs: the Use of Force in the Making of Russian Capitalism (Ithaca: Cornell University Press, 2002), and of articles in Social Research, Politics and Society, and Europe-Asia Studies.

Elena Zdravomyslova, Candidate of Sciences (Sociology, Institute of Sociology of the Russian Academy of Sciences). Co-director of the Gender Studies Program at EUSP. Professor Zdravomyslova is author of Paradigms of Western Sociology of Social Movements (in Russian; Moscow, 1994). Co-editor of Biographical Research in Eastern Europe: Altered lives and broken biographies (Aldershot and Burlington: Ashgate, 2003), In Search of Sexuality (in Russian; SPb: Bulanin, 2002), A Reader in the Feminist Theory (in Russian; SPb: Bulanin, 2000) and Civil Society in Northern Europe (St. Petersburg, 1997, in Russian).

== Degree status ==
In accordance with the EUSP formal and academic status, the MA degree received as a result of studying within the IMARES program is accredited by the Russian state. It is fully licensed according to the state register of academic disciplines including:

- Political Sciences in Regional, International and Comparative Perspectives;
- Social Research in Contemporary Society;
- Cultural Anthropology;
- Russian and Foreign Art: Problems of Interaction;
- Contemporary Approaches to Economic Theory;
- Problems of Russian History and Source Study.

The first two of the above-mentioned accredited disciplinary fields represent the core of the IMARES curriculum. Therefore, those whose focus is political and/or social studies can obtain respective diplomas in one academic year. For those who intend to obtain a diploma in anthropology or art history, three semesters of study are required. To obtain a diploma in History or Economics it takes four semesters.

IMARES has been in operation since 1998. Its language of instruction is English. Over 210 students from 14 countries have taken classes, some for one semester (credits), others for the whole year (full degree). Over 80 MA degrees have been awarded.

The degree is based upon the merit and reputation of the EUSP. Credits obtained at IMARES are formally recognized by the Elliot School of Government of The George Washington University, DC, and the Aleksanteri Institute of The University of Helsinki.

== Other EUSP international programs ==
MARCA Petropolitana is a master's degree program with an emphasis on courses in Russian/Soviet culture.
ENERPO is a new program to be started in 2012 and dedicated to the issue of Eurasian energy politics.
