= Ishaq ibn Isma'il =

Emir of Tiflis
- Reign: 833-853
- Predecessor: Ali I
- Successor: Muhammad ibn Khalid al-Shaybani
- Dynasty: Shuabids
- Father: Ismail ibn Shuab
- Religion: Sunni Islam

Ishaq b. Isma'il b. Shuab al-Tiflisi (before 833 – 853), also known as Sahak in Georgian sources, was the emir of Tbilisi between 833 and 853. He was married to a daughter of king of Sarir and followed his uncle Ali on the throne.

== Rule ==
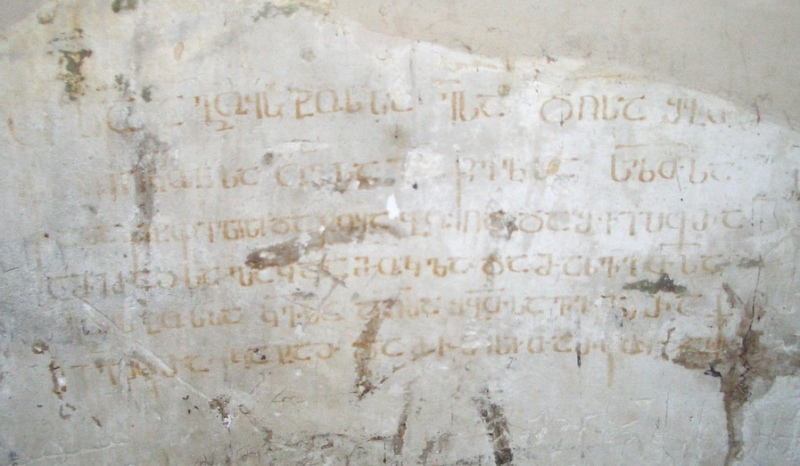
Ateni Sioni Church inscription of 853, mentioning the downfall of the emir

Under his rule, the emirate reached the apex of its power. He forced Georgian princes to pay tribute from Kakheti to Abkhazia. He tried to become independent from the Abbasid caliphate, stopped reversing the tribute, and allied himself with local nobility such as Samuel of Kakheti and Guaram Mampali. In retribution, the caliph Al-Mutawakkil sent an expedition against him led by Bugha al-Kabir (also known in Georgia as Bugha the Turk), assisted by the Georgian noble Bagrationi family.

In 853, they burnt and sacked Tbilisi, and killed the emir. He was replaced by Muhammad ibn Khalid al-Shaybani.

== Sources ==
- Minorsky, Vladimir (1958). A History of Sharvān and Darband in the 10th-11th Centuries. Cambridge: W. Heffer and Sons. OCLC 5042566.
- Suny, Ronald Grigor (1994), The Making of the Georgian Nation: 2nd edition, p. 30. Indiana University Press, ISBN 0-253-20915-3,
