= European University at Saint Petersburg =

Private graduate university in Saint Petersburg, Russia

- Европейский университет в Санкт-Петербурге
- Motto: Собирая лучшее Addo Optimus Una (Latin)
- Motto in English: Bringing the Best Together
- Type: Private
- Established: 28 November 1994
- Rector: Vadim Volkov
- Academic staff: 170
- Students: 360
- Location: Saint Petersburg, Russian Federation; 59°56′52″N 30°20′30″E
- Campus: Urban
- Website: eusp.org/en

University rankings

Regional – Overall
- QS Emerging Europe and Central Asia: 117 (2022)

The European University at Saint Petersburg (Russian: Европейский университет в Санкт-Петербурге), sometimes referred to as EUSP, is a non-state graduate university located in Saint Petersburg, Russia. It was founded in 1994.

The main language of instruction at the university is Russian. However, the Department of Political Science and Sociology (ranked top three in Eastern Europe and the best in Russia in 2002) in 1998 launched a programme in Russian and Eurasian studies IMARES for graduates of Western universities, which is delivered in English. A similar program though more concentrated on Russian cultural history and arts, MARCA, existed until 2017. The third MA program with English training, Energy Politics in Eurasia or ENERPO, started in Fall 2012.

== Programme and fellowship ==
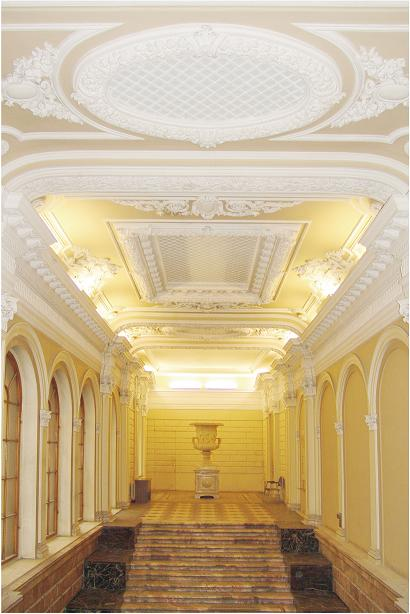
EUSP, the main hallway

As a graduate university EUSP primarily trains PhD candidates and those pursuing an MA degree. The university runs two curricula - one is targeted at Russian-speaking students, while the other one is taught in English. The MA programme taught in Russian covers studies in economics, ethnology, history, history of arts, and political science and sociology.

The International Programs run by the university and taught in English include:

- IMARES - International MA in Russian and Eurasian Studies
- ENERPO - International MA in Energy Politics in Eurasia
- Certificate of study, one or two semesters, not leading to a degree; offering the same choice of credit courses as on IMARES or ENERPO but without a requirement to complete an MA thesis

== Campus ==
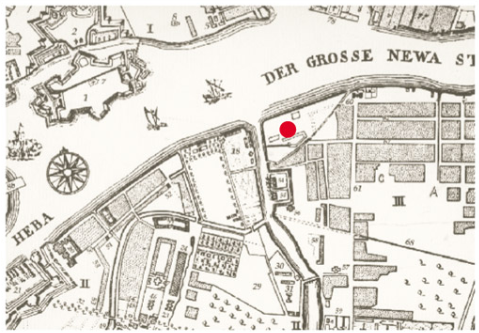
EUSP location on an 18th-century map

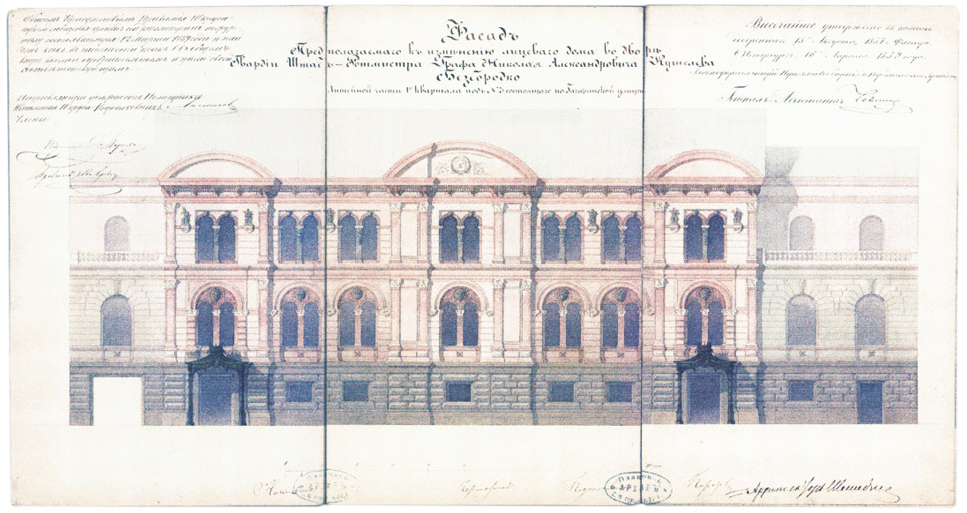
A new facade for the mansion of A.G.Kushelev-Bezborodko by architect E.Schmidt (1859)

Since its foundation the university has occupied the 18th century Small Marble Palace also known as the Mansion of Count A.G.Kushelev-Bezborodko, a senator during the reign of Russian Emperor Nicholas I. The building is situated in the centre of Saint Petersburg at 3 Gagarinskaya street.

== History ==
The idea of a university breaking the mold of the usual state higher educational system in Russia was born at the end of the 1980s. That was a period of democratic revival and romantic inspiration in the country, when the Soviet Union was already in the twilight. Such a university was also deemed to reverse the brain drain, a phenomenon that hit hard the Russian academia in the late Soviet - early post-Soviet period.

The suggestion of the name "European" belongs to Leo Klejn, professor of Archeology at Saint Petersburg State University, and a member of the group of enthusiasts who prompted the foundation of EUSP. At the end of the 1980s Russian and American politicians, statesmen and academicians would moot a foundation of the American University in Moscow that would receive support from American companies and private individuals. Leo Klejn thought that as soon as American funds had already been tapped into by Moscow, its historical rival Saint Petersburg, popularly known as Russia's "window on Europe", should establish a "European University".

At the beginning of the 1990s the concept of European University had taken a concrete form with active participation of Anatoly Sobchak, the first Mayor of Saint Petersburg, Boris Firsov, then the President of the Saint Petersburg Branch of the Institute of Sociology, Russian Academy of Sciences, and other intellectuals. Since then the major events in the history of EUSP have been as follows.

On 28 November 1994, the university was registered with state authorities in Saint Petersburg.

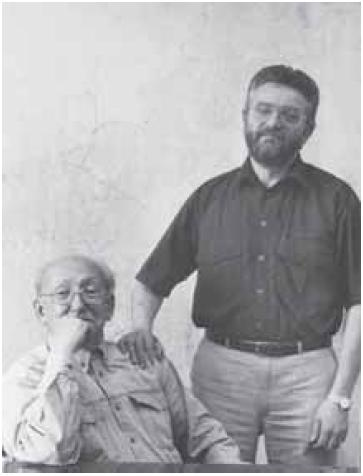
Boris Firsov (L) and Nikolai Vakhtin (R) wrote a very first draft of the Concept of EUSP in 1992

In spring 1995 an agreement was reached between the university and the municipal authorities on allocation of funds from the city budget towards rental costs of the university building on 3 Gagarinskaya street (then Furmanova St.) and its maintenance.

In January 1996, the governing bodies of HESP, the Ford Foundation, and John D. and Catherine T. MacArthur Foundation decided to grant funds to EUSP towards opening the main academic programme. It started later that year, in September, when four departments - Economics, Ethnology, History, Political Science and Sociology - were licensed to admit students on the main academic course for the first time. In September 1997, the new Department of History of Arts started its programme of open graduate courses. The Department of Political Science and Sociology admitted first students on the international programme in Russian studies (IMARS) taught in English.

In September 2000, the first admission of students to the main academic programme at the Department of History of Arts took place. In July 2004, the university was officially accredited by the Russian Federal Body for Control over the Higher Professional Education. In July 2006, EUSP obtained a state license to confer doctorate degrees.

May 2007: the European University became the first institution of higher education in Saint Petersburg and the second in Russia to set up an endowment fund. In winter-spring 2008, the university was living through the tumultuous "case of fire safety rules violation", which was deemed to be an example of political pressure exerted on academic freedom in Russia.

In 2016, the university lost its accreditation after the Federal Service for Supervision in Education and Science conducted an audit and revealed several violations in a series of documents accompanying the academic process. It is unclear whether the accreditation has been returned, but the university has said they expect it to be done later in the year.

=== Political pressure and temporary closure in February/March 2008 ===
In 2007 the university received a €700,000 grant from the European Commission towards a project aimed at improvement of the monitoring of elections in Russia. That provoked a harsh criticism of the activities of the university by the Russian government. After a reported threat from a government official, the EC-funded project was closed by the University on 31 January 2008.

Shortly after, however, following a fire safety inspection, the European University was closed down by a ruling of a Saint Petersburg court for the six-week period from 7 February 2008 until 21 March 2008, drawing protests by students, staff as well as the wider Russian and international academic community. Finally, compliance with fire regulations was deemed sufficient by the court, and the university resumed classes on 24 March 2008. Since then the university has remained open and has continued its academic work.

Spring events of 2008 were covered in the film Pugovka (a button in Russian) produced by Iliya Utekhin, a professor of anthropology at EUSP. The film has been shown in Saint Petersburg and then in Berlin in 2011, during a third European meeting of EUSP alumni.

Today, EUSP maintains a good relationship with different levels of government and administration, as evidenced among other things by a visit and meeting of the Russian Minister for Education and Science Andrei Fursenko with the faculty and students at EUSP on 4 June 2009 and by the address by deputy governor of Saint Petersburg Mikhail Oseevsky at the opening of the academic year ceremony on 7 September 2009.

== Administration and organisation ==
One hundred and eighty student studied under a faculty of 50 professors and lecturers during the academic year 2007–2008.

=== Organisations ===
==== Governing bodies ====
The European University is effectively governed by three boards: the University Administration, headed by the Rector (presiding officer); the Academic Council; and the board of trustees. The Rector of European University is the day-to-day administrator of the institution, elected for a three-year term by the Academic Council, subject to the Board of Trustees' approval.

Three men have served as Rector since the foundation of the university:

- 1995 – 2003: Dr. Boris Firsov, a well-known sociologist and the central figure in the foundation of EUSP
- 2003 – 2009: Dr. Nikolai Vakhtin, professor in sociolinguistics, a co-author of the initial "Concept of EUSP", held two terms as Rector
- June 2009 – June 2017: Dr. Oleg Kharkhordin, the first Rector with a Western PhD (Political Science, University of California, Berkeley), and a former Vice-Rector for Development under whose auspices the university started setting up its endowment.
- June 2017 – August 2018: Dr. Nikolai Vakhtin took the position again as an interim rector.
- September 2018 – present time: Dr. Vadim Volkov, a well-known sociologist and Head of the Research Institute for the Rule of Law.

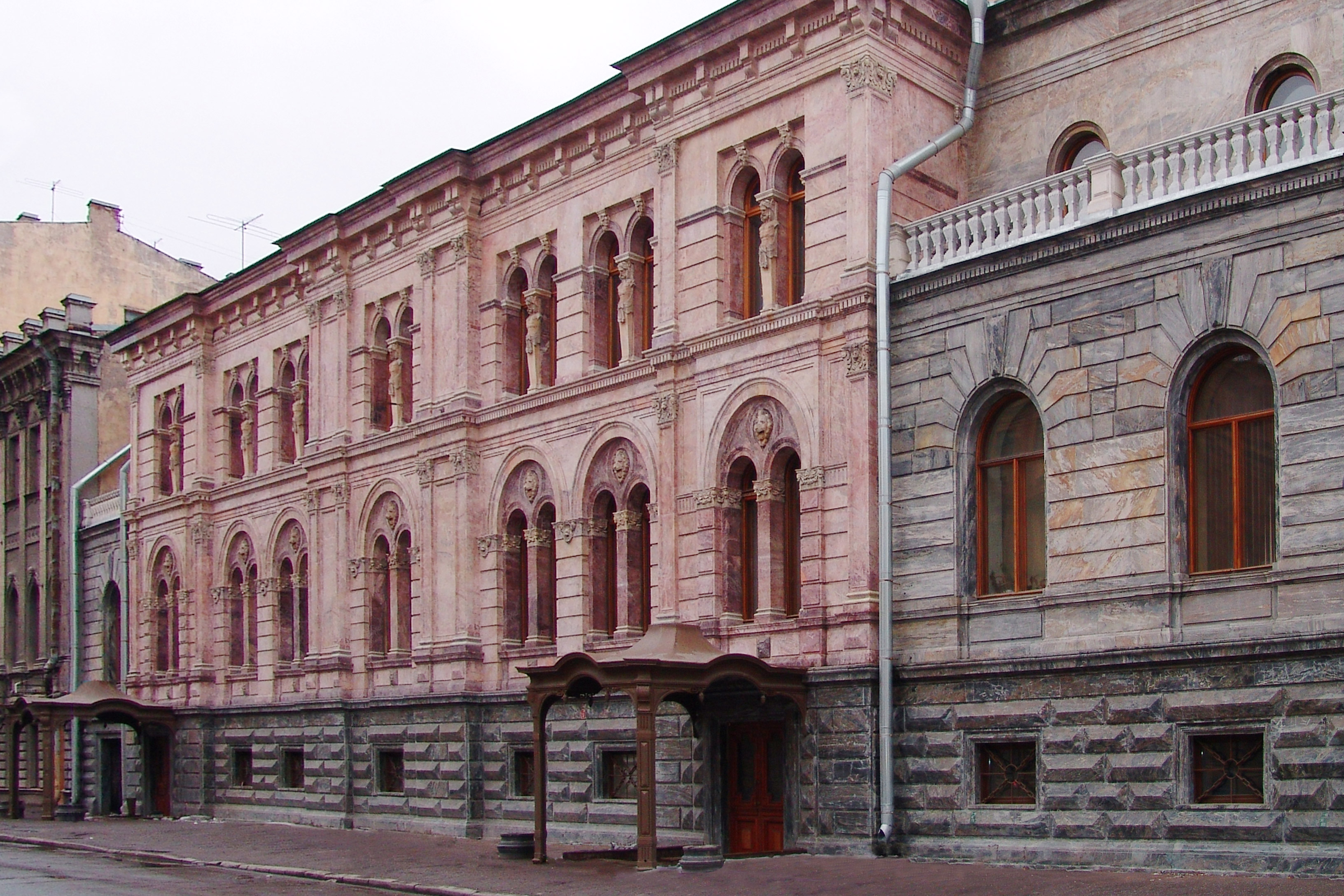
EUSP building in the 21st century

==== Departments ====
European University has six departments:

- Department of Anthropology (before 2008 - Department of Ethnology)
- Department of History
- Department of Art History
- Department of Political Science
- Department of Sociology
- Department of Economics

==== International programs ====
European University at Saint Petersburg offers programs in English:

- For undergraduates
  - Undergraduate Study Semester in Russia - 1 semester and up to 5 courses in Russian politics, economy, society, arts and history
- For postgraduates
  - IMARES - 1-year MA degree program in Russian and Eurasian studies
  - IMARES PLUS - 2-year MA degree program in Russian and Eurasian studies with options in Russian culture, mandatory Russian (or English) language courses, and a workshop series
  - ENERPO - 1-year MA degree program in Energy Politics in Eurasia
  - ENERPO PLUS - 2-year MA degree program in Energy Politics in Eurasia with practical experience and mandatory Russian (or English) language courses
  - MARCA - 1-year MA degree program in Russian cultural history and arts (from September 2016, MARCA was combined with IMARES)
  - PhD research affiliation

==== Research and training centers ====
- Archival Training Centre
- Center for Environmental and Technological History
- Center for European Studies

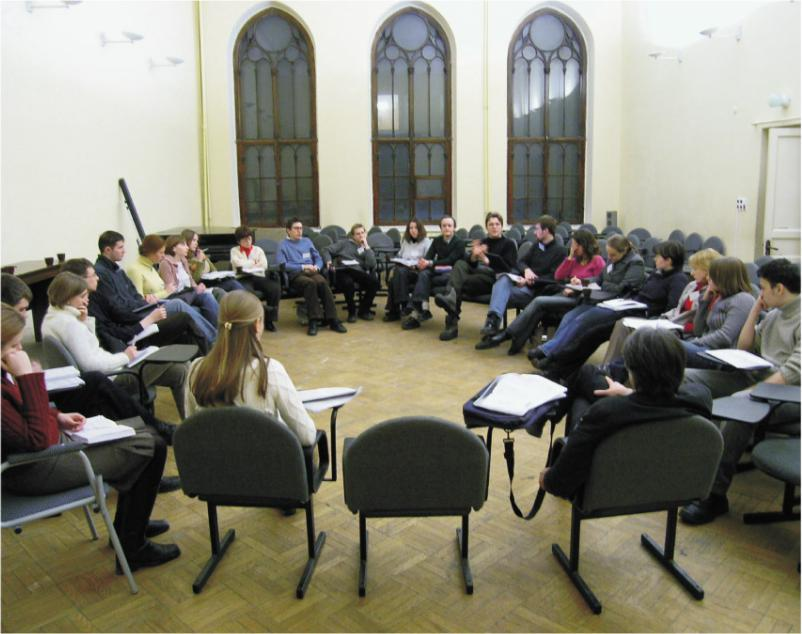
Debates in the conference hall, 2004

- Center for Field Ethnological Research
- Computing Centre
- Gender Studies
- Institute for the Rule of Law
- Interdepartmental Center «Res publica»
- Interdepartmental Center «Petersburg Judaica»
- Language Centre
- Oral History Center
- The program "Executive Master of Philosophy"
- The program "Promoting Social Studies of Education in Russia"
- Science and Technology Studies (STS) Center

==== International relations ====
The university is a member of the University of the Arctic. UArctic is an international cooperative network based in the Circumpolar Arctic region, consisting of more than 200 universities, colleges, and other organizations with an interest in promoting education and research in the Arctic region. The collaboration has been paused after the beginning of the Russo-Ukrainian War in 2022.

=== Endowment and fundraising ===
Since its foundation, the activity of the university has been supported inter alia by financial donations from the Municipal Government and Duma of Saint Petersburg, the John D. and Catherine T. MacArthur Foundation, Ford Foundation, the International Higher Education Support Program (HESP, Open Society Institute and Soros Foundations Network), TACIS/TEMPUS, INTAS, the Spencer Foundation, the Carnegie Foundation, the German ZEIT-Stiftung Ebelin und Gerd Bucerius and Fritz Thyssen Stiftung, the Russian Foundation for Basic Research (РФФИ) and the Russian Foundation for Humanities (РГНФ).

Following enactment of the Russian Federal Law on endowments of non-commercial organisations, EUSP was the third in Russia and the first in Saint Petersburg to register its endowment fund (on 7 May 2007). Currently the university endowment is one of the biggest in the country.

== Library ==
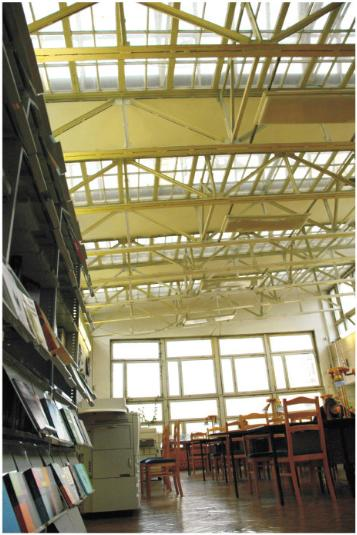
The university library

The university library contains some 50,000 registered volumes that are available on an open access basis. In addition to volumes of books and journals the library provides easy access to network resources, publications on optical discs, audio and video tapes, as well as full-text digital databases in Russian and foreign languages such as EBSCO, JSTOR, Science Direct, archives of the World Bank, Cambridge University Press, Oxford University Press, the American Council of Learned Societies (ACLS) History E-Book Project, and others.

Students of the European University can also tap into the resources of the National Library of Russia. Its main building is some 30 min walk from the EUSP building. The National Library contains more than 35 million volumes in Russian and foreign languages, including more than 15 million books, some 13.1 million journals and 617,000 yearly newspaper subscriptions.

== EUPress ==
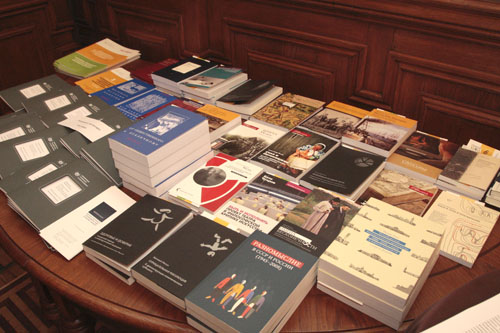
Some books published by EUPress

Since foundation EUSP has had its own publishing house, the EUPress. The house primarily supports scientific activity of the university, by publishing progressive pieces of research produced by university faculty and students. However, the publishing house also accepts manuscripts from authors not formally affiliated with EUSP. Books, as opposed to working papers, etc., have been published by the EUPress since 2000, and by now more than 90 editions in social sciences and humanities have seen the light. The topical orientation of the books published is aimed both at scientific community and at a wider public interested in modern social research. Since December 2009 the EUPress has operated an Internet bookshop.

== Alumni ==
Oxford, Harvard, Yale, CERGE-EI in Prague, University of Chicago, European University Institute (Florence, Italy), Max Planck Institute for the Study of Societies (Cologne, Germany) are just a few of the renowned international schools to have accepted EUSP graduates. Other alumni followed on with a career in the Russian government, international companies and organisations such as the World Bank, the United Nations Secretariat New York, the US Department of State and the European Commission.

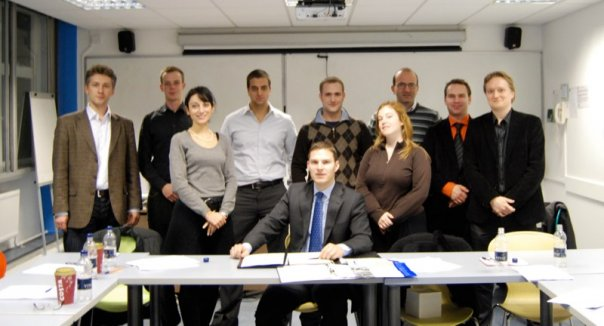
The founders of EUSP Alumni (Europe) e.V. at LSE, 15 November 2008

In autumn 2008 the European chapter of the alumni association was formally established as charitable association "European University at Saint Petersburg Alumni (Europe) e.V." in London, UK. The inaugural meeting of its founders and board took place on 15 November 2008 at the London School of Economics and Political Science. The association is an institutional and legal framework for Europe-based alumni to complement the existing international alumni network. It was registered under German law to be able to collect income tax exempt donations from at least 14 European countries (Germany, UK, France, Switzerland, Netherlands, Ireland, Poland, Belgium, Italy, Luxembourg, Romania, Bulgaria, Slovakia, Hungary; via the Transnational Giving Europe network) for EUSP and its members.
