= Emirate of Tbilisi =

Muslim outpost in the Caucasus

Emirate of Tbilisi إمارة تفليسي Imārah Tiflīsī (in Arabic) თბილისის საამირო Tbilisis saamiro (in Georgian)
- 736–1122
- Emirate of Tbilisi in 1060.
- Capital: al-Tefelis
- Common languages: Classical Arabic, Georgian
- Religion: Christianity, Judaism, Islam(from 943)
- Government: Emirate
- History
  - Established: 736
  - Siege of Tbilisi: 1122
| Preceded by | Succeeded by |
| Principality of Iberia | Kingdom of Georgia |
- Today part of: Georgia

The Emirate of Tbilisi (Georgian: თბილისის საამირო Tbilisis saamiro, Arabic: إمارة تفليسي Imārah Tiflīsī) was a Muslim emirate in Transcaucasia. The Emirs of Tbilisi ruled over the parts of today's eastern Georgia from their base in the city of Tbilisi, from 736 to 1080 (nominally to 1122). Established by the Arabs during their rule of Georgian lands, the emirate was an important outpost of the Muslim rule in the Caucasus until recaptured by the Georgians under King David IV in 1122.

Georgia and the Caucasus around 740, just after the emirate was established.

== History ==
The Arabs first appeared in Georgia, namely in Kartli (Iberia) in 645. It was not, however, until 735 that they succeeded in establishing firm control over a large portion of the country. In that year, Marwan II took hold of Tbilisi and much of the neighbouring lands and installed there an Arab emir, who was to be confirmed by the Caliph or, occasionally, by the ostikan of Armīniya.

During the Arab period, Tbilisi (al-Tefelis) grew into a center of trade between the Islamic world and northern Europe. Beyond that, it functioned as a key Arab outpost and a buffer province against the Byzantine and Khazar dominions. Over time, Tbilisi became largely Muslim, but the Muslim influences were strictly confined to the city itself, while the environs remained largely Christian.

Tbilisi was a large city with a strong double wall pierced by three gates. It lay on both banks of the Kura River, and the two parts were connected by a bridge of boats. Contemporary geographers especially mention its thermal springs, which supplied the baths with a constant flow of hot water. On the river there were water-mills. The houses were primarily built of pine wood, to the surprise of contemporary Arab travelers. In the first half of the ninth century, Tbilisi is said to have been the second-largest, after Derbend, a city in the Caucasus, with at least 50,000 inhabitants and thriving commerce. Several intellectuals born or living in Tbilisi, bearing the nisba al-Tiflisi were known across the Muslim world.

The Abbasid Caliphate weakened after the Abbasid civil war in the 810s, and its power was challenged by secessionist tendencies among peripheral rulers, including the Emir of Tbilisi. At the same time, the emirate became a target of the resurgent Georgian Bagrationi dynasty who were expanding their territory from Tao-Klarjeti across Georgian lands. The Emirate of Tbilisi grew in relative strength under Ishaq ibn Isma'il (833–853), who was powerful enough to suppress the ambitions of the Georgian princes and to contend with the Abbasid authority in the region. He withheld his annual payment of tribute to Baghdad, and declared his independence from the Caliph. To suppress the rebellion, in 853 Caliph al-Mutawakkil dispatched a punitive expedition led by Bugha al-Kabir (also known as Bugha the Turk), who burned Tbilisi to the ground and had Ishaq decapitated, ending the city's chances of becoming the center of an independent Islamic state in the Caucasus. The Abbasids chose not to rebuild the city extensively, and as a result the Muslim prestige and authority in the region began to wane.

=== Unsuccessful Georgian attempts to capture Tbilisi ===
==== Capture of Jafar by Liparit Baghvashi and Ivane Abazasdze ====
In 1032, the Eristavi of Kldekari and Kartli, Liparit Baghvashi and Ivane Abazasdze lured Emir Jafar of Tbilisi from the city and captured him. It seems that the emir could not have imagined such a development of events, because he went to the meeting with the Georgian nobility without any doubts, especially since he and Bagrat IV marched on Ganja with joint forces. He probably spent five years in captivity. It is difficult to say why the Georgians did not manage to organize the capture of the city that was left without an ruler. Ivane Javakhishvili pointed out that after the capture of the fortress of Birtvisi, the king took pity on Emir and again confirmed him as the ruler of Tbilisi, According to Kopaliani, Bagrat came under the influence of Liparit and Ivane's opponent feudal lords, who saw the threat of strengthening Baghvashi in taking over the city, therefore he refused to capture Tbilisi. One way or another, the Emirate of Tbilisi remained an independent entity.

==== Siege of Tbilisi (1038–1040) ====
Although one year after the release of Jafar, the Georgians under the leadership of Liparit tried to capture Tbilisi. Historians believe that Liparit convinced the king of the need to capture Tbilisi and called for another campaign. The army that entered Tbilisi blocked all roads to cut off the city from the outside world. A siege circle was formed around Tbilisi. The population was gripped by terrible hunger. The people of Tbilisi were going to give up over the city to the king, and the Emir was thinking about escaping quietly, but suddenly, after a two-year siege, Bagrat offered a truce to Jafar, and the Georgian troops immediately left Tbilisi. This issue has also become the cause of dispute among historians. Ivane Javakhishvili, based on the preserved information of Ibn al-Athir, connects this hasty decision of the king with the entry of the Seljuks into Armenia and Azerbaijan, while M. Lortkipanidze again blames the princes who are opposed to Liparit for the failure of the attempt to capture Tbilisi, although he also does not rule out the influence of the Seljuk campaigns on the king.

=== Capture of Tbilisi by David the Builder ===
==== Siege of Tbilisi (1122) ====
From the 12th century, David IV started a fight to expel the Seljuks from Transcaucasia, the march on Tbilisi was part of this fight. In 1122, the king was able to capture Tbilisi. As the city was not surrendered without a fight, the king took it by storm and brutally assaulted the city's rulers and brutally massacred the Muslim population. Nevertheless, David's heartbreak soon subsided and he granted the people of Tbilisi many concessions: he released them from the tax of that year and, at the request of the Muslims, he ordered that no one in their area should slaughter a pig. The king granted Muslims the right to freely pray. The king also granted tax benefits to Muslims: Georgians paid five dinars a year, Jews - four, and Muslims - three dinars. The king promised the Muslims, Jews, and Armenians of Tbilisi to live safely in the city and to keep their faith intact, so that they could freely continue their peaceful trade activities. The capital of Georgia was moved from Kutaisi to Tbilisi. The city soon became the economic and cultural center of the country. With this, the Emirate of Tbilisi ended its approximately 400-year existence.

== Legacy ==
The office of emir — amira or amirtamira — now an appointed Georgian royal official — survived in Tbilisi, as well as other big cities of Georgia, into the 18th century, being substituted by the office of mouravi.

== Rulers ==
| Emir | Reign | Dynasty | Notes |
|---|---|---|---|
| 1. Isma'il b. Shuab | (until 813) | Shuabids | |
| 2. Mohammed I b. Atab | 813 – 829 | Shuabids | |
| 3. Ali I b. Shuab | 829 – 833 | Shuabids | |
| 4. Ishaq b. Isma'il b. Shuab | 833 – 853 | Shuabids | |
| 5. Muhammad II b. Khalil | 853 – 870 | Shaybanids | |
| 6. Isa b. al-Shaykh al-Shayban | 870 – 876 | Shaybanids | |
| 7. Ibrahim | 876 – 878 | Shaybanids | |
| 8. Gabuloc | 878 – 880 | Shaybanids | |
| 9. Jafar I b. Ali | 880 – 914 | Jafarids | |
| 10. Mansur I b. Jafar | 914 – 952 | Jafarids | |
| 11. Jafar II b. Mansur | 952 – 981 | Jafarids | |
| 12. Ali II b. Jafar | 981 – 1032 | Jafarids | |
| 13. Jafar III b. Ali | 1032 – 1046 | Jafarids | |
| 14. Mansur II b. Jafar | 1046 – 1054 | Jafarids | |
| 15. Abu'l-Hayja b. Jafar | 1054 – 1062 | Jafarids | |
| | 1062 – 1068 | | City council |
| 16. Fadlun of Ganja | 1068 – 1080 | Jafarids | appointed by Alp Arslan |
| | 1080 – 1122 | | City council |
| | | | annexed to Kingdom of Georgia |

== Sources ==
- Allen, WED (1932), A History of the Georgian People, K. Paul, Trench, Trubner & Co,
- Minorsky, V., Tiflis in Encyclopaedia of Islam
- Suny RG (1994), The Making of the Georgian Nation (2nd Edition), Bloomington and Indianapolis, ISBN 0-253-35579-6
