= Ismail ibn Shuab =

Ismail ibn Shuab al-Tiflis

Emir of Tiflis
- Reign: 8th century-813
- Predecessor: Unknown
- Successor: Muhammad ibn Atab
- Dynasty: Shuabids
- Religion: Sunni Islam

Ismail ibn Shaub al-Tiflis is the first known ruler of the Emirate of Tiflis, an Arabic medieval state centered around the Georgian city of Tbilisi. His reign, lasting from the end of the 8th century to 813, is mostly documented by the Arab historian Ya'qubi who wrote about his rebellions against the Abbasid Caliphate.

== Biography ==
Ismail was the first known member of the Shuabid dynasty, a powerful Arab dynasty established in Tiflis since the Abbasid invasion of the 730s. He may have been a son of Sayyid ibn al-Khayyam ibn-Shuyb, a military commander who led expeditions into Kartli towards the end of the 8th century, and the older brother of Ali ibn Shuab.

Probably around the end of the 8th century, Ismail was named, possibly by Caliph Harun al-Rashid, as Emir al-Tiflis, leading the Arab administration in Georgia and becoming the first to hold the title. His reign most likely coincided with the martyrdom of Abo Tbileli, a Christian Arab killed by the emirate for spreading the Georgian Orthodox Church's faith.

Ismail al-Tiflis had to face the ambitions of the rising Bagrationi dynasty, whose prince Ashot governed large territories from the southwest to the center of Georgia, isolating the Emirate of Tiflis. Ismail formed an alliance with the Prince-Bishop of Kakheti Grigol and with the mountain tribes of Eastern Transcaucasia and went to war against Ashot, but was defeated during the Battle of Ksani.

In 809, he used the succession conflict that followed the death of Harun al-Rashid to revolt against the Abbasid Caliphate. But a military expedition by Muhammad ibn Harun al-Amin forced him to pledge allegiance. Four years later, following the takeover of the Abbasid empire by Al-Ma'mun, he rebelled once more, again with Grigol of Kakheti. In response, Al-Ma'mun recognized Ashot Bagrationi as Prince of Iberia and tasked him with expelling Ismail from Tiflis.

In 813, Ismail ibn Shuab disappeared from history and was replaced by Muhammad ibn Atab.

== Bibliography ==
- Brosset, Marie-Félicité (1849). Histoire de la Géorgie depuis l'Antiquité jusqu'au XIXe siècle. Volume I [History of Georgia from Ancient Times to the 19th Century, Volume 1] (in French). Saint-Petersburg: Imperial Academy of Sciences.
- Suny, Ronald Grigor (1988). The Making of the Georgian Nation. Indianapolis: Indiana State University.
