= Alaborg =

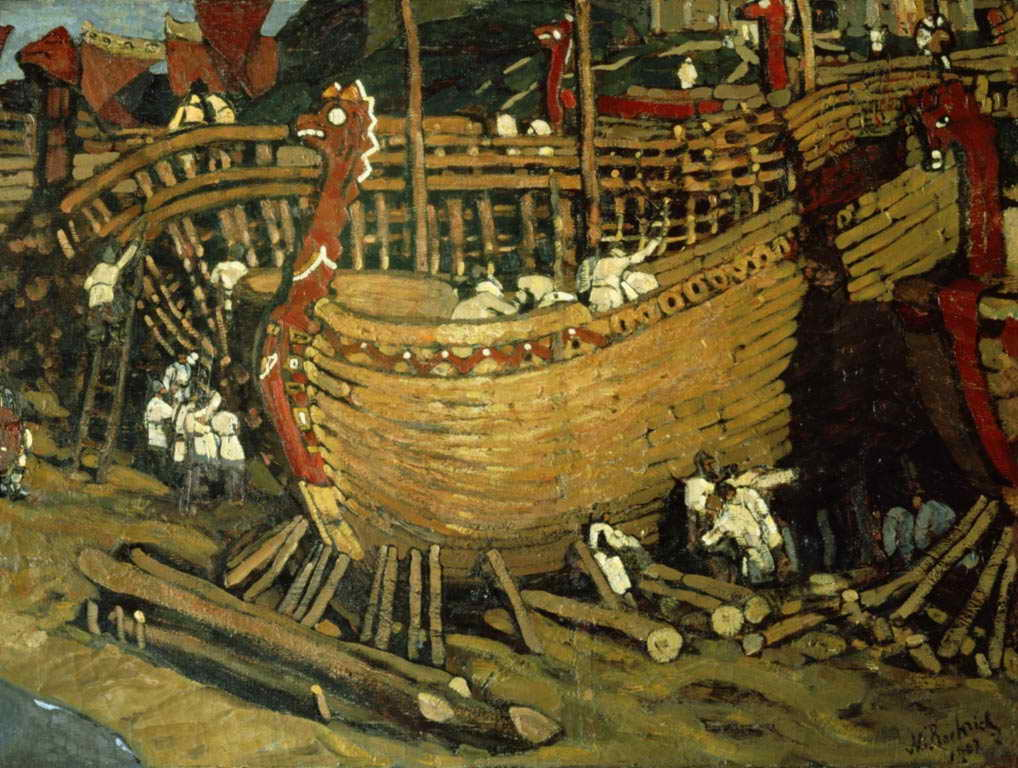
Nicholas Roerich. Longships Built in the Land of the Slavs (1903)

Álaborg or Áluborg is the name of a Varangian fort mentioned in the Norse sagas about Halfdan Eysteinsson and Hrolf Ganger. The first saga indicates that it was possible to sail from Aldeigjuborg (Ladoga) to Alaborg northward by sea, but a more rapid and practicable way was by land eastward. The text implies that Alaborg and Aldeigjuborg were two rivals, situated at a short distance from each other.

In 1989, Tatiana Jackson demonstrated that the only location conforming to this description is the so-called "Gorodishche" (literally, "abandoned fortress") on the Syas River. It was the only sizable settlement in the area east of Ladoga until the 13th or 14th century. Its Norse name may derive from the Valya River that flows in the vicinity.

== Archaeology ==
Nikolay Repnikov was the first historian to recognize the archaeological importance of the village Gorodishche on the Syas River (Russian: Сясьское городище). Repnikov published his observations in 1900 but it was not until 1929 that Vladimir Ravdonikas started extensive excavations of the site. During the years of Stalinism, the finds brought to light by Ravdonikas were lost, while the archaeological site was turned into a quarry for construction of a highway. As a result, the core of the site was totally destroyed and its overall integrity deteriorated.

Excavations of Alaborg were resumed in 1987–1990 by Oleg Boguslavsky and Anna Machinskaya. They defined the following areas of archaeological interest:

- an urban settlement (gorodishche) on a promontory between the river and a creek (now almost totally destroyed);
- rural settlements on the same promontory;
- a cluster of fifteen (formerly twenty) large conical tumuli to the northwest from the promontory;
- an outcrop of eight tumuli in the village Gorodishche;
- twenty five small mounds, about one mile to the southeast from the promontory;
- twenty nine "druzhina" mounds, about one mile to the northwest from the promontory (almost all excavated in 1929);
- a chain of barrows along the right bank of the river (ten barrows were attested in the 1920s, only two extant as of 1993).

== Historical context ==
Compared with the Volkhov, the Syas River provided an alternative (and more rapid) route from the Baltic to the Volga. Its main drawback was the rapids, which made the river impracticable for Viking longships. While crossing the rapids, the ships were particularly susceptible to attacks from land. To protect these key points, the Varangians established the fortified settlements of Duboviki and Gorodische at the head of the lower and upper Volkhov rapids, accordingly. In a parallel fashion, Alaborg commanded a 20-metre-high hill above the Syas rapids (although no traces of actual fortifications have been found there in the 1980s).

Boguslavsky and Machinskaya date the earliest Scandinavian burial at Alaborg to ca. 700 CE. Archaeologically, the site has much in common with Ladoga. It seems that the two sites developed on parallel lines. Alaborg was destroyed by fire and abandoned before the 930s, most likely towards the end of the 9th century. At that period all the other centres of the Rus' Khaganate faced with destruction, which Constantine Zuckerman associates with Vadim's uprising, as recorded in the East Slavic chronicles.
