= Liubsha Air Base =

Air base in Ukraine

Lyubsha
- IATA: none; ICAO: XKLL

Summary
- Airport type: Military
- Operator: Ukrainian Air Force
- Location: Kalush, Ukraine
- Elevation AMSL: 807 ft / 246 m
- Coordinates: 49°17′18″N 024°11′54″E

Maps
- Shown within Ivano-Frankivsk Oblast XKLL (Ukraine)
- Interactive map of Lyubsha

Runways
Direction	Length		Surface
Direction	ft	m	Surface
	7,874	2,400	Concrete

Lyubsha was an air base in Ukraine located 32 km north of Kalush. It was located south of Lviv near the Polish-Slovak border. It appeared to be a forward staging base. One poorly maintained and small parallel taxiway, and a small ramp were located on the airfield.

== History ==
In the 1970s, aviators of the 179th Fighter Aviation Regiment practiced landing Sukhoi Su-9s at the advanced deployment airfield in Lubsha.
