= Ali ibn Shuab al-Tiflis =

Ali I of Tiflis

Emir of Tiflis
- Reign: 829-833
- Predecessor: Muhammad ibn Atab
- Successor: Ishaq
- Ali ibn Shuab
- House: Shuabids
- Father: Sayyid ibn al-Khayyam ibn-Shuyb
- Religion: Sunni Islam

Ali ibn Shuab al-Tiflis was a leader of the Emirate of Tiflis, an Arab state in Georgia that reigned from 829 to 833. A member of the Shuabid dynasty, he was a subject of the Abbasid province of Arminiya and was appointed to replace a rebellious emir. His short reign was marked by the continuation of Tiflis's conflict with Christian Georgia.

== Biography ==
Ali ibn Shuab was a member of the Shuabid dynasty, a powerful Arabic family residing in Tiflis since the Arab invasion of the 730s. He may have been a son of Sayyid ibn al-Khayyam ibn-Shuyb, a military commander who led expeditions in Kartli toward the end of the 8th century, and the younger brother of Ismail ibn Shuab, the first known emir of Tiflis.

In 829, he was appointed emir al-Tiflis, leading the Arab administration at the center of Georgian territories, by Khalid ibn Yazid al-Shaybani, the Abbasid governor of Arminiya, who had deposed the rebellious emir Muhammad bin Atab, thus restoring the Shuabid dynasty.

Leading Arab forces in Georgia, he faced the Reconquista ambitions of Ashot I Bagrationi, Kouropalates in Iberia. The latter was murdered in January 830 by orders of the Abbasid governor of Arminiya, while Ali managed to reject the advances of Ashot's successor Bagrat I and forced him to pay tribute. His control on the rest of Georgia remained short-lived and he was replaced by his nephew Ishaq.

== Bibliography ==
- Asatiani, Nodar; Janelidze, Otar (2009). History of Georgia. Tbilisi: Publishing House Petite. ISBN 978-9941-9063-6-7.
