= Mariam Lortkipanidze =

Soviet and Georgian historian (1922–2018)

- მარიამ ლორთქიფანიძე
- Born: 28 August 1922; Batumi (Georgian Soviet Socialist Republic)
- Died: 8 January 2018 (aged 95)
- Occupation: Historian
- Employer: Tbilisi State University
- Awards: Order of Honor (2000); State Prize of Georgia (1982); Ivane Javakhishvili Award; Order of Honor (1997)

Mariam (Marika) Lortkipanidze (Georgian: მარიამ (მარიკა) ლორთქიფანიძე; 28 August 1922 – 8 January 2018) was a Soviet and Georgian historian, specializing in the history of Georgia.

Mariam Lortkipanidze was born in Batumi on 28 August 1922. She graduated from Tbilisi State University, Department of History in 1943. Her PhD thesis was "Emirate of Tbilisi" (1948). She became doctor of science in 1964 and a member of the Georgian National Academy of Sciences in 1993.

== Publications ==
Most widely held works by Mariam Lortʻkʻipʻaniże:

- Adrepʻeodaluri xanis kʻartʻuli saistorio mcerloba, 1966
- Istorija Gruzii XI-načala XIII veka : (naučno-populjarnyj očerk), 1974
- A glimpse of Georgian history, 1983
- Georgia in the XI-XII centuries, 1987
- Apʻxazebi da apʻxazetʻi, 1990
- Essays on Georgian history, 1994
