= Vladimir Pashuto =

Russian medievalist (1918–1983)

Vladimir Terentyevich Pashuto (Russian: Владимир Терентьевич Пашуто; 19 April 1918 – 10 June 1983) was a Soviet Russian Marxist historian who specialized in the history of medieval Lithuania and Russia, especially in their foreign policies.

He graduated from the Leningrad University in 1941 and joined the staff of the Institute of History of the Soviet Academy of Sciences in 1948. He was elected a corresponding member of the Academy of Sciences in 1976. He was awarded the Order of the Badge of Honor.

In his 1958 monograph The Genesis of Lithuania, he argued that it was the pressure of Teutonic invasions that forced the disparate Lithuanian tribes to forge a unified state known as the Grand Duchy of Lithuania. Pashuto is credited as consultant on several films about medieval Russia, including Tarkovsky's masterpiece Andrei Rublev (1966).

Pashuto and his colleague Anatoly Novoseltsev helped bring to light a number of foreign sources related to Russia's medieval history. His approach was further developed by a team of prominent disciples such as Alexander Nazarenko.
