= Aleksandr Nazarenko =

Russian historian (1948–2022)

Aleksandr Vasilievich Nazarenko (Russian: Александр Васильевич Назаренко; 1948 – 19 January 2022) was a Russian historian who worked in the Moscow State University. He headed the project "Russia and Central Europe in the Middle Ages" in the World History Institute of the Russian Academy of Sciences.

== Biography ==
Nazarenko was born in Panevėžys in 1948. Having studied at the university to gain doctorates in philology and history, he revived the tenet of 19th-century Russian historiography that it is impossible to research early East Slavic history without detailed knowledge of ancient languages. Considered a disciple of Vladimir Pashuto, Nazarenko advocated tighter integration of historiography with the auxiliary disciplines of genealogy, numismatics, and sigillography. This approach allowed him to identify and publish a number of new (mostly foreign) sources on the history of Kievan Rus.

Nazarenko's major findings were summarized in a monograph International Relations of Ancient Rus. Upon its publication in 2009, the book won Nazarenko the Macarius Award of the Russian Orthodox Church.

He died from COVID-19 in Moscow on 19 January 2022, at the age of 74.

== Bibliography ==
- International Relations of Ancient Rus (Древняя Русь на международных путях: Междисциплинарные очерки, культурных, торговых, политических отношений IX—XII веков). Moskva: Russkiĭ fond sodeĭstviii︠a︡ obrazovanii︠u︡ i nauke. 2009, ISBN 5-91244-009-5
