= Mikhail Artamonov (historian) =

Russian historian and archaeologist (1898–1972)

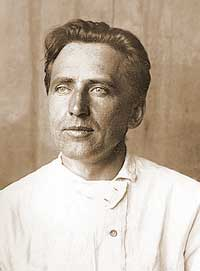
- Artamonov in 1922
- Born: Mikhail Illarionovich Artamonov; 5 December 1898; Vygolovo, Tver Governorate, Russian Empire
- Died: 31 July 1972 (aged 73); Leningrad, Soviet Union
- Resting place: Northern Cemetery, Saint Petersburg
- Awards: Order of Lenin

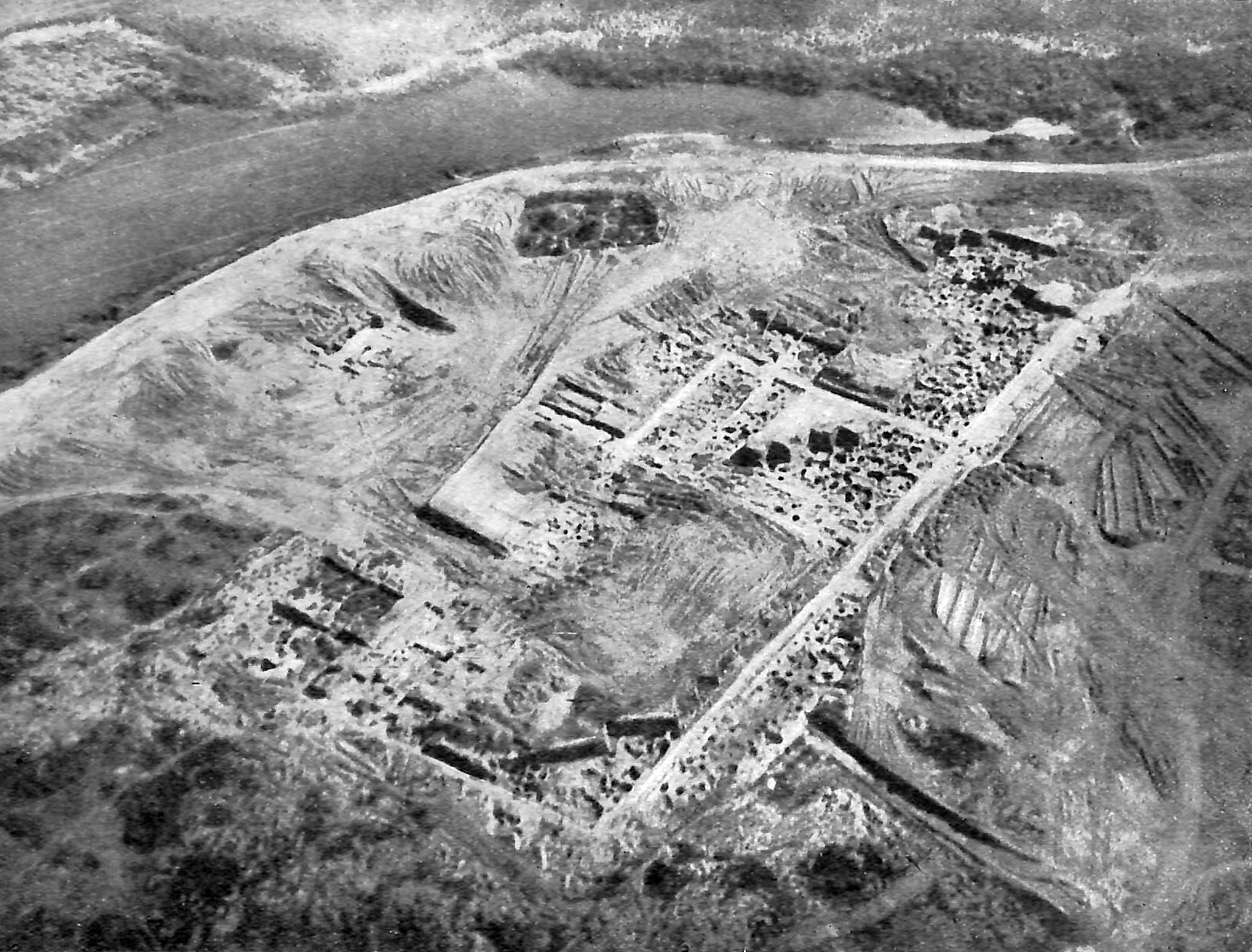
The site of the Khazar fortress of Sarkel, which was discovered and excavated by Artamonov in the 1930s.

Mikhail Illarionovich Artamonov (Russian: Михаил Илларионович Артамонов; 5 December [O.S. 23 November] 1898 – July 31, 1972) was a Soviet and Russian historian and archeologist, who came to be recognized as the founding father of modern Khazar studies.

== Biography ==
Artamonov was born into a peasant family in Tver Governorate. He moved to Saint Petersburg when he was nine years old to pursue secondary education, including studying painting under Kuzma Petrov-Vodkin and art history under Nikolai Sychov, as well as archaeology. He was an active participant in the Russian Revolution.

Artamonov's scholarly career was centered on Leningrad University, where he taught from 1928, was a professor from 1935 and the head of the department of archaeology from 1949.

He researched Bronze Age and Iron Age settlements by the Don River, in the North Caucasus and in Ukraine. He excavated a great number of Scythian and Khazar kurgans and settlements (most famously, the Khazar fortress of Sarkel, which he discovered during the first excavation he arranged in 1929), and published a hefty monograph (Istoriya Khazar) on the Khazars in 1962. Early editions of this work (1937, 1939), which emphasized the enormous influence of the Khazars on the development of the early Rus' and other peoples, were denounced by Soviet authorities, compelling him to add a conclusion to his work stating essentially that they had in fact had no lasting influence.

In 1939, he was appointed Director of the Academy of Sciences of the Soviet Union's Institute of the History of Material Culture in accordance with the wishes of the institute's staff, after they rebelled against Artamonov's predecessor, Joseph Orbeli, who had sacked many of its leading members - an about-face by the authorities which was unprecedented during Stalin's rule. Under his leadership the Institute launched a number of periodicals, including Sovetskaya arkheologiya, Brief Reports of the IHMC and Materials and Research on the Archaeology of the USSR, and also established a branch in Moscow.

Artamonov was appointed director of the Hermitage Museum in 1951. Thirteen years later, he was ousted from office due to resisting interference from Communist Party officials in his running of the Museum, especially regarding his refusal to remove paintings by the French Impressionists - described by the government as "bourgeois decadents" - from display.

Artamonov was awarded the Order of Lenin, the Order of the Red Banner of Labour and various medals. His many disciples include Lev Gumilyov, Anatoly Kirpichnikov, Dmitry Machinsky, and Igor Dubov. Among the students he trained were Svetlana Pletnyova and Leo Klejn. He died in 1972, whilst at his desk editing a scientific article.

== See also ==
- Russian archaeology
- List of Russian archaeologists
