= Nikolai Sychov =

Russian painter

Nikolai Petrovich Sychyov (Russian: Николай Петрович Сычёв; 27 April 1883 – 16 July 1964) was a Soviet and Russian art historian, specialist in museum conservation and restoration, artist and a university professor. Among his students were Mikhail Artamonov and Savva Yamshchikov.

== Early life ==
Nikolai Sychyov was born in Saint Petersburg. He studied at Gymnasium 11. At the age of 15 years he met the Professor A. Gorovsky who made a strong impression on him. He became interested in painting, got permission to go to the museum of the Imperial Academy of Arts and learn to paint. He spent so much time drawing that it nearly got him expelled from the Gymnasium. Inside the Academy he saw a lot of famous painters, such as Vladimir Makovsky, Arkhip Kuindzhi, Ilya Repin. Sychyov wanted to be a student of the Imperial Academy of Arts, but his parents refused. After much debate Sychyov decided to devote himself to history.

== Career ==
Nikolai Sychov graduated from the Saint Petersburg State University in 1910. He earned a master's degree in art history. He then taught at the university and at the Imperial Academy of Arts. Sychyov headed the Russian Museum from 1922 to 1926, where he was in charge of first permanent exhibitions and shaped its collection to a considerable degree. He wrote several works and monographs on different periods of Russian history and various Russian artists. Sychyov continued to paint and was a member of the Artists Society (1921).

Nikolai Sychyov was arrested on 17 September 1933 as a member of "the counter-revolutionary national and fascist organization" during the so-called Slavists Trial (Russian: Дело славистов), a series of false accusations against Saint Petersburg intelligentsia. He was sentenced to eight years in a labor camp. After discharge he lived in Chistopol, and then in Vladimir. In 1944 he started working on the reconstruction of Vladimir's Dormition Cathedral and participated in the restoration of the frescoes by Andrei Rublev. He was arrested again, but in 1954 his criminal record was cleaned. He died in Vladimir at the age of 81.

== Publications ==
- The Keeping of the Russian Iconography and the Ancient Works of Church named after the Emperor Nicholas II at the Russian Museum (Russian: Древлехранилище памятников русской иконописи и церковной старины имени императора Николая II при Русском музее императора Александра III), 1916
- The Forgotten Fragments of the 12th-century Novgorod Frescos (Russian: Забытые фрагменты новгородских фресок XII века), 1918
- The Miniatures Painting Instructions (Russian: Инструкция для описания миниатюр), 1922
- The Stroganovsky School Works of Art Exhibition (Russian: Выставка произведений искусства Строгановской школы), 1923
