= Novye Duboviki =

Novyye Duboviki (Russian: Новые Дубовики; literally: "New Oak Grove") is an archaeological site in Leningrad Oblast of Russia, located about 9 kilometres (5.6 mi) south of Ladoga upstream the Volkhov River, at the head of the lower Volkhov rapids.

In the Early Middle Ages, Novyye Duboviki was the site of a Norse-Slavic fort, which guarded the crossing of the rapids. The settlement flourished in the late 9th century, but was burned to the ground in the early 10th century. It was later revived on a much smaller scale, and was operated by the Novgorod Republic in the High Middle Ages, as a minor pogost.

Although the site is seriously damaged by modern building activities, a series of excavations, undertaken since 1884, revealed traces of a predominantly Scandinavian settlement, covering no less than six hectares. The fort was ringed by at least ten burial mounds, ranging from seven to ten metres in height. The tallest barrow, built around a 9-metre-high vertical pole, stands 10.5 metres (34 ft) high.

Recent research established Duboviki as key to understanding the earliest fortifications of Holmgard (Novgorod). As Ladoga did not possess strong fortifications in the early medieval period, it was Duboviki that shielded Novgorod from potential attacks by the Norse raiders. The Varangian (and later Slavic) military stationed at Duboviki could effectively block the passage for pirate ships moving up the Volkhov towards Novgorod.

Prior to the construction of the hydroelectric station, the shores of the river near Duboviki were craggy, exceeding twenty metres in height. As late as the 19th century, dozens of boats were shipwrecked while passing the rapids each year. Remains of another early medieval fort were detected at the head of the upper Volkhov rapids slightly upstream.

As a result of this ingenious system of natural and man-made defences, medieval Novgorod was never susceptible to pirate attacks, unlike its principal rivals, such as Sigtuna, Ladoga, Kaup, and others.
