= Dmitry Machinsky =

Russian archaeologist

Dmitry Alexeyevich Machinsky (Russian: Дмитрий Алексеевич Мачинский, 1937 – 8 January 2012) was a Russian archaeologist. He lived in Saint Petersburg and worked in the Hermitage Museum. Machinsky is particularly well known for having excavated Lyubsha and other Viking settlements along the Volkhov River. Machinsky attributed these settlements to the Rus' Khaganate, whose capital — as he believed — was Ladoga.
