= Anatoly Novoseltsev =

Russian orientalist (1933–1995)

Anatoly Petrovich Novoseltsev (Анатолий Петрович Новосельцев; 26 July 1933, Irkutsk, Union of Soviet Socialist Republics – 12 September 1995 Moscow, Russia) was a Russian orientalist who brought to light and translated into Russian a slew of obscure Persian and Arab documents relating to the early history of Kievan Rus'.

Together with Vladimir Pashuto he authored The Foreign Policy of Ancient Rus (1968), a groundbreaking study that demonstrated that Rus' had been as active in the Caucasus and Central Asia as it had been in Europe. He later published a sketch of the history of Khazaria and opposed the Anti-Normanist dogma perpetuated in the official Soviet historiography inter alia by Boris Rybakov.

Novoseltsev was elected a corresponding member of the Russian Academy of Sciences in 1984. He managed the Russian History Institute, affiliated with the Academy of Sciences, between 1988 and 1993. He was succeeded by Andrey Nikolayevich Sakharov.
