= 750s =

Decade

The 750s decade ran from January 1, 750, to December 31, 759.

== Events ==
=== Egypt ===
- Military action continues in the Bashmurian war. Egyptians granted tax breaks in the Nile Delta.

=== Arab Caliphate ===
- January 25 – Battle of the Zab: Abbasid forces under Abdallah ibn Ali defeat the Umayyads near the Great Zab River. Members of the Umayyad house are hunted down and killed. Defeated by his rivals, Caliph Marwan II flees westward to Egypt, perhaps attempting to reach Al-Andalus (Iberian Peninsula), where there are still significant Umayyad armies.

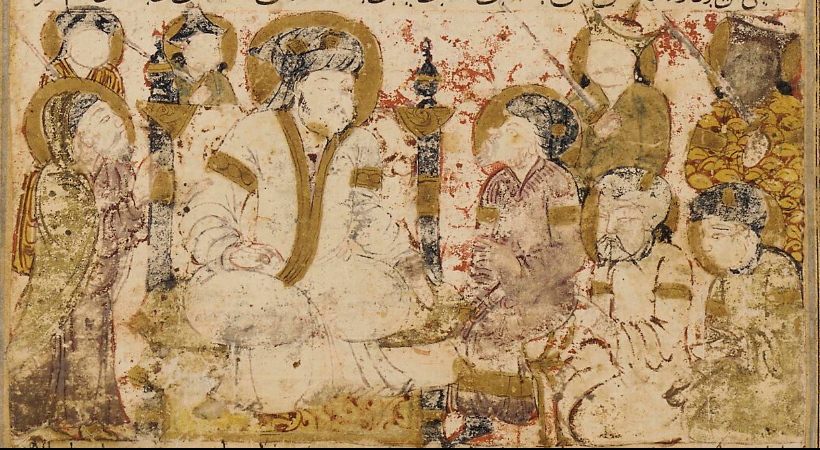
Al-Saffah became caliph (ruler) of the Islamic Caliphate on 25 January 750. He ruled from 750 to 10 June 754.

- August 6 – Marwan II is caught and killed at Faiyum by supporters of the Abbasid caliph As-Saffah. Almost the entire Umayyad Dynasty is assassinated; Prince Abd al-Rahman I escapes to Al-Andalus. The Abbasids assume control of the Islamic world and establish their first capital at Kufa.

=== Europe ===
- King Alfonso I of Asturias establishes the Kingdom of Galicia, in roughly the northwest of the Iberian Peninsula. The exact time this happened is contested.
- The town Slaný in the Central Bohemian Region (Czech Republic) is founded at the site of a salt spring, according to one chronicle written in the sixteenth century (approximate date).

=== Britain ===
- King Eadberht of Northumbria imprisons Cynewulf, bishop of Lindisfarne, at Bamburgh Castle. King Eadberht does this in order to punish the bishop for sheltering one of his enemies, Prince Offa. He then besieges Prince Offa, son of the late King Aldfrith, in Lindisfarne Priory. Almost dead from hunger, he is dragged from his sanctuary and put to death.
- Battle of Mugdock: The Strathclyde Britons under King Teudebur defeat Prince Talorgan of the Picts. This leads to the decline of the power of King Óengus I.

=== Africa ===
- The Ghana Empire begins (approximate date).

=== India ===
- Gopala I is proclaimed as the first ruler and founder of the Pala Empire.

=== America ===
- Native Americans, in the area now known as the Four Corners, begin constructing and occupying pueblos.
- The city of Teotihuacan (modern Mexico) is destroyed and left in ruins, its palaces burned to the ground.

=== Indonesia ===
- Borobudur, or Barabudur (a Mahayana Buddhist temple in Magelang, Central Java, Indonesia, as well as the world's largest Buddhist temple, and also one of the greatest Buddhist monuments in the world) is built (approximate date).

=== By topic ===
==== Art ====
- The "Western Paradise" of Amitābha Buddha, detail of a wall painting in Cave 217, Dunhuang (China), is made during the Tang Dynasty (approximate date).

==== Food and drink ====
- In China during the Tang Dynasty, a barge load of tea (a medicinal herb) comes up the Grand Canal to Luoyang, from Zhejiang (approximate date).

=== By place ===
==== Byzantine Empire ====
- June – Leo IV, son of Emperor Constantine V, is crowned co-emperor at Constantinople. Only a year or so after his mother Irene died, Constantine's second wife Maria dies, at approximately the same time as Leo's coronation.

==== Europe ====
- November – Pepin the Short, youngest son of Charles Martel, forces the last Merovingian king Childeric III to retire to the monastery of Saint-Bertin. He proclaims himself as king of the Franks with the support of Pope Zachary, and is crowned at Soissons by Boniface, bishop of Mainz, becoming, as Pepin III, the first Carolingian monarch of the Frankish Kingdom.
- King Aistulf of the Lombards captures Ravenna and the Romagna, ending the Byzantine Exarchate of Ravenna. The last exarch Eutychius is killed by the Lombards. Aistulf threatens Rome, claiming a capitation tax. Pope Zachary, alarmed, appeals for aid from the Byzantine Empire, but his request is declined.

==== Abbasid Caliphate ====
- Battle of Talas: First recorded encounter (and the last) between Arab and Chinese forces. The rulers of Tashkent and Ferghana are both nominal vassals of the Tang Dynasty; the Chinese have intervened on behalf of Ferghana in a conflict between the two; the Abbasid Caliphate, competing with the Chinese for control of Central Asia, has become involved. Arab forces from Samarkand have marched to challenge a Chinese army (30,000 men) under Gao Xianzhi. Gao has had a series of military victories in the region, but his Turkish contingent, Karluk mercenaries, defects. Out of 10,000 Tang troops, only 2,000 manage to return from the Talas River to China. The Arabs triumph, and they will remain the dominant force in Transoxiana for the next 150 years.
- Muslim introduction of papermaking: The first paper mill in the Islamic world begins production at Samarkand. Captured craftsmen, taken at the Battle of Talas River, have by some accounts revealed the technique of papermaking (although paper may have arrived from China much earlier via the Silk Road). Arab scholars will use paper to produce translations of Ancient Greek and Roman writings.

==== Asia ====
- Like the storm of 721, the storm of this year at the southern Chinese seaport of Yangzhou reportedly destroys over 1,000 ships engaged in canal and river traffic (approximate date).
- The Japanese poetry anthology Kaifūsō is assembled.

=== By topic ===
==== Religion ====
- Kim Daeseong, chief minister of Silla, orders the construction of the Bulguksa and Seokguram temples at Gyeongju (South Korea).
- The oldest surviving printed document, a Buddhist scripture, is printed in Korea.
- Theodore succeeds Theophylact as Orthodox Patriarch of Antioch.
- The Great Buddha at Tōdai-ji in Nara (Japan) is completed.

=== By place ===
==== Europe ====
- King Pepin III ("the Short") begins a Frankish military expedition down the Rhône Valley, and receives the submission of eastern Septimania (i.e. Nîmes, Melguelh, Agde and Béziers), after securing Count Ansemund's allegiance.
- Siege of Narbonne: Pepin III lays siege to the fortress city of Narbonne, occupied by Gothic-Muslim forces. The garrison and residents are able to withstand the attacks, thanks to the supplies provided by sea by the Arab fleet.

==== Britain ====
- Battle of Burford: King Cuthred of Wessex clashes with King Æthelbald of Mercia, and takes the standard (a golden dragon). He manages to throw off his claim to Mercian overlordship.
- King Teudebur of Alt Clut dies. His son, Dumnagual III, succeeds to the throne and loses Kyle to a joint invasion, by kings Óengus I of the Picts and Eadberht of Northumbria. ^{(Most records show Dumnagual III succeeds Rotri in 754 AD. Erroneous statement suspected)}

==== Africa ====
- Abd al-Rahman ibn Habib al-Fihri, ruler of Ifriqiya (North Africa), dispatches a Muslim army and reconquers Tripolitania from the Ibadites (a puritanical Khaijite sect), driving their remnants south into the Nafusa Mountains (northwestern Libya).
- Abd al-Rahman ibn Habib al-Fihri launches an assault on the island of Sardinia, perhaps the beginning of the occupation of the island by the Muslim Arabs that lasts until 1005. He also attempts to invade Sicily, but finds the defenses too strong.

==== Mesoamerica ====
- Yaxun B'alam IV becomes king (ajaw) of the Maya city of Yaxchilan (modern Mexico), after a 10-year struggle for the throne.

=== By topic ===
==== Religion ====
- March 22 – Pope Zachary dies at Rome after an 11-year reign. He is succeeded by Stephen, but he dies four days after, and is not considered legitimate because he was not consecrated.
- March 26 – Pope Stephen II (sometimes referred to as Stephen III) succeeds Zachary as the 92nd pope of the Catholic Church. He marks the end of the Byzantine Papacy.
- June – Stephen II recognizes the Carolingian dynasty as legitimate rulers of the Frankish Kingdom. He travels to Paris and appeals for Frankish support against the Lombards.
- Emperor Shōmu (retired since 749) takes part in the dedication ceremony of the Great Buddha, (15 metres) at Tōdai-ji in Nara (Japan), and declares himself a Buddhist.

=== By place ===
==== Europe ====
- Grifo, Frankish duke and illegitimate son of Charles Martel, rebels against King Pepin III ("the Short") (his half-brother), in alliance with the Bretons. He flees to Italy to join King Aistulf of the Lombards, but is caught and killed while passing the Alps.
- The town of Staraja Ladoga (Northern Russia) is founded by Scandinavians. The settlement becomes a prosperous trading outpost for jewelry, casual items, craft tools and dress adornments (approximate date).
- Sevar, ruler (khagan) of the Bulgarian Empire, dies after a 15-year reign. He is succeeded by Kormisosh, who belongs to the Vokil clan (approximate date).

=== By topic ===
==== Religion ====
- Fall – Pope Stephen II travels to the Lombard capital of Pavia, for negotiations with Aistulf. His terms for returning the Exarchate of Ravenna are declined.
- November – Stephen II crosses the passes of the Alps to Gaul. He leaves Rome unprotected, under threat of a siege from the Lombards.
- Eoban is appointed bishop of Utrecht (modern Netherlands), by the missionary bishop Boniface.

=== By place ===
==== Europe ====
- July – Stephen II anoints Pepin's sons, Charles (later known as Charlemagne) and Carloman, consecrating them as patricians. At Quierzy he proclaims the Carolingian dynasty holy, and appeals for help against the Lombards. Finally, the Frankish nobles give their consent to a campaign in Lombardy.
- July 28 – Pope Stephen II re-consecrates Pepin III (the Short) as king of the Franks, at the Basilica of Saint-Denis outside Paris, bestowing upon him the additional title of Patricius of the Romans. This marks the first recorded crowning of a civil ruler by a pope. Pepin assumes the role of ordained protector of the Catholic Church.
- Summer – The Franks under Pepin III invade Italy, and defeat the Lombards under King Aistulf, in the Susa Valley (Piedmont). He enforces the terms, including cession of the Exarchate of Ravenna to Rome.
- The oldest document mentioning the city of Ferrara (Northern Italy) is from this year (approximate date).

==== Abbasid Caliphate ====
- June 10 – Caliph as-Saffah dies of smallpox after a 4-year reign. He is succeeded by his nominated heir and brother al-Mansur, as ruler of the Abbasid Caliphate.

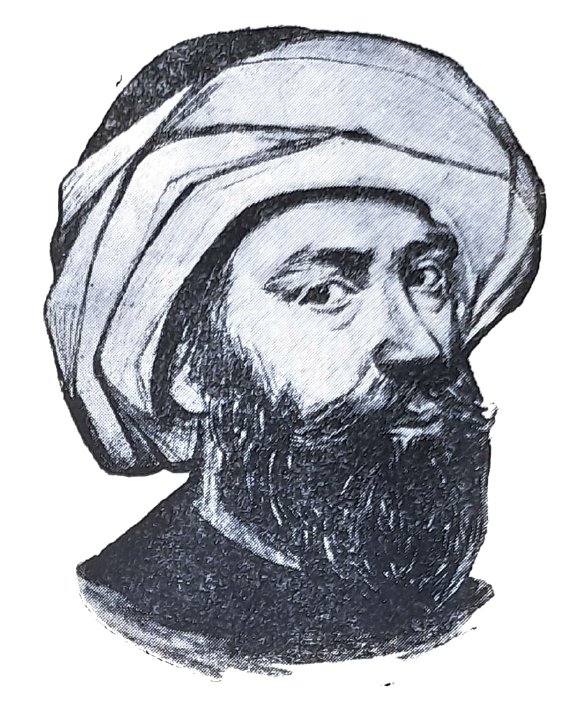
Abbasid caliph al-Mansur (r. 754–775)

- November – Abdallah ibn Ali, governor of Syria and uncle of as-Saffah, launches a claim for the caliphate, but is defeated by forces loyal to al-Mansur, under Abu Muslim, at Nisibis (modern Turkey).

==== Asia ====
- Jianzhen, Chinese Buddhist monk, arrives in Nara, where he is welcomed by former emperor Shōmu and empress Kōmyō. During his visit Jianzhen introduces sugar to the Japanese court, using it to mask the flavors of foul-tasting herbal tea.
- A Tang census shows that 75% of the Chinese live north of the Chang Jiang (Yangtze) River. The capital of Chang'an has a population of 2 million and more than 25 other cities have well over 500,000 citizens (approximate date).

=== By topic ===
==== Religion ====
- February – Council of Hieria: Emperor Constantine V summons a Christian council in the palace of Hieria in Constantinople. The council, under the presidency of Bishop Theodosius of Ephesus, supports the policy of Iconoclasm and condemning the use of religious images (icons) in the Byzantine Empire. Constantine increases the persecution of the monasteries; hundreds of monks and nuns are mutilated or put to death.
- June 5 – Boniface, Anglo-Saxon missionary, is killed by a band of pagans at Dokkum in Frisia, while reading the Scriptures to Christian converts. He is later buried in the Abbey of Fulda, entrusted to his Bavarian disciple Sturm.

=== By place ===
==== Europe ====
- September – Abd al-Rahman I, a member of the Umayyad Dynasty, lands at Almuñécar in al-Andalus (modern Spain), where over the next years he will establish the Emirate of Córdoba.
- Teodato Ipato is deposed and blinded, after a 13-year reign. He is succeeded by Galla Gaulo, who usurps the ducal throne of Venice.

==== Britain ====
- The Anglo-Saxon Chronicle's description under this date (now dated 757), of King Sigeberht of Wessex being deposed by Cynewulf, is notably fuller than earlier entries.

==== Asia ====
- December 16 – General An Lushan begins the Anshi Rebellion against Emperor Xuan Zong of the Tang Dynasty (China). His army surges down from Fanyang (near modern Beijing), and moves rapidly along the Grand Canal. Meanwhile, Xuan Zong sends Feng Changqing, governor of Fanyang, to build up defenses at the eastern capital of Luoyang.
- Trisong Detsen becomes emperor of Tibet. During his reign he plays a pivotal role in the introduction of Buddhism, and the establishment of the Nyingma or "Ancient" school of Tibetan Buddhism.
- Empress Kōken introduces the Tanabata festival to Japan.

==== Central America ====
- November 8 – K'ahk' Ukalaw Chan Chaak is installed as the new ruler of the Mayan city state of Naranjo in Guatemala and reigns until his death in 780.
- Alliances and trade between Mayan city-states have begun to break down. Malnutrition is on the rise. A diminishing of the food supply creates social upheaval and war (approximate date).

=== By place ===
==== Byzantine Empire ====
- Byzantine–Bulgarian War: Emperor Constantine V builds a series of fortifications along the Byzantine frontier on the Danube, and starts settling Christian Armenians and Syrians in the Thracesian Theme. In response, Kormisosh, ruler (khagan) of the Bulgarian Empire, demands the payment of tribute. Constantine refuses, and the Bulgars raid into Thrace, reaching the Anastasian Wall stretching between the Black Sea and the Sea of Marmara (near the outskirts of Constantinople).
- Battle of Marcellae: Constantine V sends a Byzantine expeditionary force (500 ships and 6,000 cavalry) to Thrace, and defeats the Bulgars around the Danube Delta and near the fortress city of Markeli (modern Bulgaria). Kormisosh is forced to accept a peace treaty, and confirms the existing frontier. Due to the constant political crisis, the Bulgarian Empire is on the verge of destruction. Kormisosh is deposed during a palace coup and succeeded by Vinekh, a member of the Vokil clan.

==== Europe ====
- King Aistulf of the Lombards again threatens Rome with a view to making it his capital, but the Franks under Pepin III ("the Short") arrives with his sons Charles and Carloman, defeats Aistulf, and confers the Donation of Pepin, which establishes the Papal States (including the lands of Ravenna and the Pentapolis). Pepin has taken territory that legally belongs to the Byzantine Empire; he gives it to Pope Stephen II.
- Aistulf dies in a hunting accident, and is succeeded by Desiderius as king of the Lombards. Ex-king Ratchis attempts unsuccessfully to seize the throne, but is opposed by Stephen II.
- Galla Gaulo is deposed, blinded and exiled. He is succeeded by Domenico Monegario as the sixth doge of Venice. During his reign Venetian maritime traders become increasingly active.
- May – Prince Abd al-Rahman I and his followers capture the city of Seville without violence. He defeats Yusuf ibn 'Abd al-Rahman al-Fihri in a battle for control of the Muslim-ruled parts of the Iberian Peninsula (al-Andalus). Abd al-Rahman establishes the Emirate of Córdoba. During his reign trade and culture flourish, along with the construction of Islamic architecture (including the Great Mosque of Córdoba).

==== Britain ====
- Battle of Newanbirig: Kings Óengus I of the Picts and Eadberht of Northumbria attack King Dumnagual III of Strathclyde, at Dumbarton Castle (modern Scotland). However, Eadberht's entire force is subsequently wiped out, probably by the Britons.
- King Cuthred of Wessex dies after a 16-year reign. He is succeeded by his distant kinsman Sigeberht.

==== Abbasid Caliphate ====
- Ibn al-Muqaffa', Muslim writer and thinker, is tortured at Basra (modern Iraq), on orders from Caliph al-Mansur. His limbs are severed and he is thrown, still alive, into a burning oven (approximate date).

==== Chinese Empire ====
- January 18 – An Lushan Rebellion: The eastern capital of Luoyang falls to the 200,000-strong army of the rebel general An Lushan, who defeats loyalist forces under Feng Changqing. The rebels cross the Yellow River, and march on to capture the cities Chenliu and Yingyang (modern Zhengzhou, Henan).
- Battle of Yongqiu: A Tang garrison (2,000 men), under Zhang Xun, successfully defend their fortress against the rebel army at Yongqiu. Zhang achieves a victory after a 4-month siege, and prevents the rebels from capturing the fertile Tang territory south of the Huai River.
- February 5 – An Lushan declares himself emperor at Luoyang, establishing a new empire, called the Great Yan. He pushes on towards the primary Tang capital at Chang'an (now Xi'an). An decides to seize southern China, to cut off loyalist reinforcements. Meanwhile, numerous soldiers join the rebellion.
- May – Emperor Xuan Zong hires 4,000 Muslim mercenaries to help defend Chang'an against the rebels. Loyalist forces take defensible positions in the mountain passes, but chancellor Yang Guozhong gives orders for them to leave their posts.
- July 7 (Note: Others date it on July 9)– An Lushan crushes the Tang troops at the Tong Pass, leaving the road to the capital wide open.
- July 14 – Xuan Zong flees the capital of Chang'an (along with the imperial court) for Sichuan, as rebel forces advance through the Tongguan Pass toward the city. Meanwhile, An Lushan is ailing, perhaps with diabetes. He is nearly blind and suffers from extreme irascibility.
- July 15 – Xuan Zong is ordered by his Imperial Guards to execute Yang Guozhong, by forcing him to commit suicide or face a mutiny. He permits his consort Yang Guifei to be strangled by his chief eunuch. An Lushan also has other members of the emperor's family killed.
- August 12 – Xuan Zong abdicates the throne after a 44-year reign. He is succeeded by his son Su Zong, as emperor of the Tang Dynasty. He hires 22,000 Muslim mercenaries to reinforce his decimated army at Lingzhou.
- November 19 – Tang General Fang Guan is defeated at Xianyang. The imperial forces consisted of two thousand oxcarts with cavalry and foot soldiers on two fronts, but the rebels took advantage of their upwind position and attacked with fire. Imperial forces killed or wounded numbered more than 40,000 men.

==== Japan ====
- June 4 – Emperor Shōmu (retired since 749) dies at Nara. His wife Kōmyō dedicates over 600 items to the Great Buddha, and donates large sums of money to the Shōsō-in treasure (storehouse) in Tōdai-ji.

=== By place ===
==== Europe ====
- Tassilo III, duke of Bavaria, recognizes the supremacy of King Pepin III ("the Short") at an assembly held at Compiègne (Northern France), and becomes a vassal of the Frankish Kingdom. He swears an oath (commendatio) to Pepin, and promises his allegiance.
- King Alfonso I ("the Catholic") dies at Cangas (modern Spain), after an 18-year reign. He is succeeded by his son Fruela I as ruler of Asturias.

==== Britain ====
- King Æthelbald of Mercia is murdered by his own household in a palace coup. He is succeeded briefly by Beornred, but he is, in turn, ousted by Æthelbald's distant cousin, Offa. In the meantime, Mercian supremacy over Southern England is lost.
- King Sigeberht of Wessex acts unjustly and is removed from power by a council of nobles, in favor of Cynewulf. Sigeberht is given control of Hampshire, probably as ealdorman, but he murders one of his own men and is driven out.

==== Africa ====
- The city of Sijilmasa (modern Morocco) is founded by the Miknasa, a Zenata Berber tribe. They adopt Kharijism-Islam, and establish the Emirate of Sijilmasa in the northern Sahara. It becomes a wealthy trading center as the western end-point of the Trans-Saharan trade.
- The Warfajuma Berbers and their Sufrite allies sweep up from southern Tunisia and capture Kairouan, killing Emir Habib Al-Fihri and putting an end to the Fihrid dynasty. In the meantime, the Ibadites that Ibn Habib had driven out of Tripoli return, rallied by their imam Abu al-Khattab al-Ma'afiri in Jebel Nefusa, the Ibadites recapture Tripoli.

==== China ====
- January 29 – An Lushan, leader of a revolt and emperor of Yan, is murdered by his own son An Qingxu at Luoyang. He succeeds his father, and appoints Shi Siming as his deputy. The military leaders of the Tang Dynasty are able to retake both of the capitals at Chang'an and at Luoyang. The rebel army is forced to retreat east.
- Battle of Suiyang: A Tang garrison (7,000 men) under Zhang Xun defend their fortress against the rebel army at Suiyang. Zhang makes multiple attempts to get food from nearby fortresses, but this is refused. After a desperate 10-month siege, Suiyang is overrun by rebel forces who take the city. Because of famine an estimated 20,000 to 30,000 citizens are cannibalized, only 400 people are left.
- December 8 – Du Fu, Chinese poet, returns to Chang'an as a member of Emperor Xuan Zong's court, after having escaped the city during the An Lushan Rebellion.

=== By topic ===
==== Catastrophe ====
- March 9 – A major earthquake strikes Palestine and Syria.

==== Religion ====
- April 26 – Pope Stephen II dies at Rome after a 5-year reign, in which he has freed the papacy from Byzantine rule. Stephen allies with Pepin III against the Lombards, and becomes the first temporal sovereign of the Papal States. He is succeeded by his brother Paul I, as the 93rd pope of the Catholic Church.

=== By place ===
==== Europe ====
- Summer – Duke Liutprand of Benevento attains majority, and rebels against Lombard rule. King Desiderius defeats him, and grants his duchy to Arechis II (son of Liutprand). He marries Adelperga, daughter of Desiderius, and establishes friendly (but largely independent) relations with the Lombard Kingdom.
- Desiderius deposes Alboin, duke of Spoleto (Central Italy), and exercises ducal authority himself, tying the duchy more closely to the Lombard capital of Pavia.

==== Britain ====
- King Beorna of East Anglia dies. Prince Æthelred, descendant of the late king Rædwald, apparently succeeds as king (approximate date).
- King Eadberht of Northumbria abdicates the throne in favour of his son, Oswulf. He enters the monastery attached to the cathedral of York.
- King Swithred of Essex dies after a 12-year reign. He is succeeded by Sigeric, son of the late king Saelred (see 709).
- King Cynewulf of Wessex retakes Berkshire from the Mercians, and begins a war with the Welsh (approximate date).

==== Africa ====
- A group of four Basra-educated missionaries, including 'Abd al-Rahman Iban Rustam, proclaim the Ibadi imamate. Followers conquer the city of Kairouan (modern Tunisia), and massacre the Kharijites.

==== Asia ====
- An Lushan Rebellion: The Chinese seaport of Guangzhou is sacked by Muslim and Persian raiders. The port is shut down for the next 5 decades, while foreign vessels dock at Hanoi (modern Vietnam) instead. Guangzhou thrives again, once it is reopened to foreign trade in the early 9th century.
- June – Abbasid Arabs and Uyghur Turks arrive simultaneously at the Tang capital of Chang'an, in order to offer tribute to the imperial court. The Arabs and Turks bicker and fight over diplomatic prominence at the gate, to present tribute before the other. A settlement is reached when both are allowed to enter at the same time, but through different gates to the palace.
- Empress Kōken abdicates the throne, after a 9-year reign. She is succeeded by her adopted son Junnin, grandson of the late emperor Tenmu. He becomes the 47th emperor (tennō) of Japan.

=== By place ===
==== Byzantine Empire ====
- Battle of the Rishki Pass: Emperor Constantine V invades Bulgaria again, but his forces are ambushed and defeated while crossing the Rishki Pass, near Stara Planina (modern Bulgaria). The Bulgarian ruler (khagan) Vinekh does not exploit his success, and begins peace negotiations.

==== Europe ====
- Siege of Narbonne: The Franks under King Pepin III ("the Short") retake Narbonne from the Muslims, after a 7-year siege. He pushes them back across the Pyrenees, and the Muslims retreat to the Andalusian heartland after 40 years of occupation. The government of the city is assigned to the Visigothic count Miló.

==== Britain ====
- July 24 – King Oswulf of Northumbria is murdered by members of his own household (his servants or bodyguards), at Market Weighton. The Deiran patrician, Æthelwald Moll, who probably conspired in the regicide, is crowned king of Northumbria. He may have been a descendant of the late king Oswine of Deira.
- Exceptional winter in England: Frost begins October 1, and ends February 26, 760.

==== Abbasid Caliphate ====
- Caliph al-Mansur of the Abbasid Caliphate launches the conquest of Tabaristan (on the southern coast of the Caspian Sea). Its ruler, Khurshid II, flees into the mountainous region of Daylam.

==== Asia ====
- An Lushan Rebellion: Tang forces under Guo Ziyi lay siege to the city of Yanjing (Northern China) as they increase their efforts to end the rebellion. The fighting creates such a shortage of food within its walls that rats sell at enormous prices.
- Otomo no Yakamochi, Japanese general, compiles the first Japanese poetry anthology, Man'yōshū. It contains some 500 poems by Japanese poets who include the emperor, noblemen and commoners.
- December 24 – Tang dynasty poet Du Fu departs for Chengdu, where he is hosted by fellow poet Pei Di.

=== By topic ===
==== Religion ====
- The Tōshōdai-ji Buddhist Temple is founded in Nara, Japan.

== Significant people ==
- Al-Saffah (r. 25 January 750–10 June 754)
- Al-Mansur (r. 754–775)
- Abu Hanifa
- Pope Stephen II
- Pope Paul I

== Births ==
750

- January 25 – Leo IV, Byzantine emperor (d. 780)
- Abbas ibn al-Ahnaf, Abbasid poet (d. 809)
- Abd al-Malik ibn Salih, Abbasid general (d. 812)
- Arno, archbishop of Salzburg (approximate date)
- Bermudo I, king of Asturias (approximate date)
- Clement, Irish scholar and saint (approximate date)
- Eigil of Fulda, Bavarian abbot (approximate date)
- Hildegrim, bishop of Châlons (approximate date)
- Leo III, pope of the Catholic Church (d. 816)
- Sawara, Japanese prince (approximate date)
- Theodulf, bishop of Orléans (or 760)
- Wu Shaocheng, general of the Tang Dynasty (d. 810)

751

- June 28 – Carloman I, king of the Franks (d. 771)
- Adalard of Corbie, Frankish abbot (approximate date)
- Meng Jiao, Chinese poet (d. 814)

752

- Al-Mada'ini, Muslim scholar and historian (d. 843)
- Irene of Athens, Byzantine empress (approximate date)
- Joannicius the Great, Byzantine theologian (d. 846)
- Zheng Yin, chancellor of the Tang dynasty (d. 829)

753

- Xue Ping, general of the Tang Dynasty (approximate date)

754

- Li Fan, chancellor of the Tang dynasty (d. 811)

755

- Bello of Carcassonne, Frankish noble (approximate date)
- Wala of Corbie, Frankish noble (approximate date)
- William of Gellone, Frankish noble (approximate date)

756

- Abo of Tiflis, Christian martyr (approximate date)
- Abu Nuwas, Muslim poet (d. 814)
- Fujiwara no Uchimaro, Japanese nobleman (d. 812)
- Hisham I, Muslim emir of Córdoba (d. 796)
- Ibrahim I, Muslim emir of the Aghlabids (d. 812)
- Ismail ibn Ibrahim, Muslim scholar (d. 810)
- Li Yijian, chancellor of the Tang Dynasty (d. 822)
- Nikephoros, son of Constantine V (or 758)

757

- April 26 – Hisham I, Muslim emir (d. 796)
- Gisela, Frankish abbess (d. 810)
- Liu Ji, general of the Tang Dynasty (d. 810)
- Yeshe Tsogyal, consort of Trisong Detsen (d. 817)
- Hildegard of the Vinzgau, Frankish queen and wife of Charlemagne (approximate date; d. 783)

758

- Adrian, Count of Orléans, brother in law of Charlemagne and uncle of Louis the Pious (d. c. 821)
- Hyegong, king of Silla (Korea) (d. 780)
- Li Fengji, chancellor of the Tang Dynasty (d. 835)
- Li Jifu, chancellor of the Tang Dynasty (d. 814)
- Nikephoros, son of Constantine V (or 756)
- Nikephoros I, patriarch of Constantinople (approximate date)
- Sakanoue no Tamuramaro, Japanese shōgun (d. 811)
- Sico of Benevento, Lombard prince (approximate date)
- Theophanes the Confessor, Byzantine monk (or 760)
- Wang Zhixing, general of the Tang Dynasty (d. 836)
- Wu Yuanheng, chancellor of the Tang Dynasty (d. 815)

759

- Alfonso II, king of Asturias (d. 842)
- Asad ibn al-Furat, Muslim jurist and theologian (d. 828)
- Gregory of Khandzta, Georgian archimandrite (d. 861)
- Quan Deyu, chancellor of the Tang dynasty (d. 818)
- Theodore the Studite, Byzantine abbot (d. 826)
- Wang Shizhen, general of the Tang dynasty (d. 809)
- Wu Yantong, Chinese Buddhist monk (approximate date)

== Deaths ==
750

- January 25 – Ibrahim ibn al-Walid, Umayyad caliph
- August 6 – Marwan II, ruling Umayyad caliph (b. 688)
- Abdallah ibn Abd al-Malik, Umayyad prince (or 749)
- Agilulfus, bishop of Cologne (approximate date)
- Al-Abbas ibn al-Walid, Umayyad prince and general
- Basil the Confessor, Eastern Orthodox saint
- Boruth, prince (knyaz) of Carantania (approximate date)
- Bressal mac Áedo Róin, Dál Fiatach king of Ulaid
- Burchard, bishop of Würzburg (approximate date)
- Himelin, Scottish priest (approximate date)
- Inreachtach mac Dluthach, king of Uí Maine (Ireland)
- Irene of Khazaria, Byzantine empress (approximate date)
- Isonokami no Otomaro, Japanese nobleman
- Veborg, Scandinavian shieldmaiden (approximate date)

751

- June – Maria, Byzantine empress
- Childebrand I, duke of Burgundy (b. 678)
- Eutychius, Byzantine exarch of Ravenna
- Fergus mac Fogartaig, king of Brega (Ireland)
- Gisulf II, duke of Benevento (approximate date)
- Mansur ibn Jumhur al-Kalbi, Arab governor of Sindh
- Taki, Japanese princess and Saiō

752

- March 15 – Zachary, pope of the Catholic Church
- March 26 – Stephen, pope of the Catholic Church
- Lupus, duke of Spoleto (Italy)
- Teudebur, king of Alt Clut (Scotland)

753

- August 8 – Hildegar, bishop of Cologne
- November 3 – Pirmin, Visigothic abbot (b. c. 700), founder of many monasteries in the historical region of Alemannia
- Grifo, Frankish duke and son of Charles Martel (b. 726)
- Herlindis of Maaseik, Frankish abbess (or 745)
- Li Linfu, chancellor of the Tang Dynasty
- Sevar, ruler (khagan) of the Bulgarian Empire (approximate date)

754

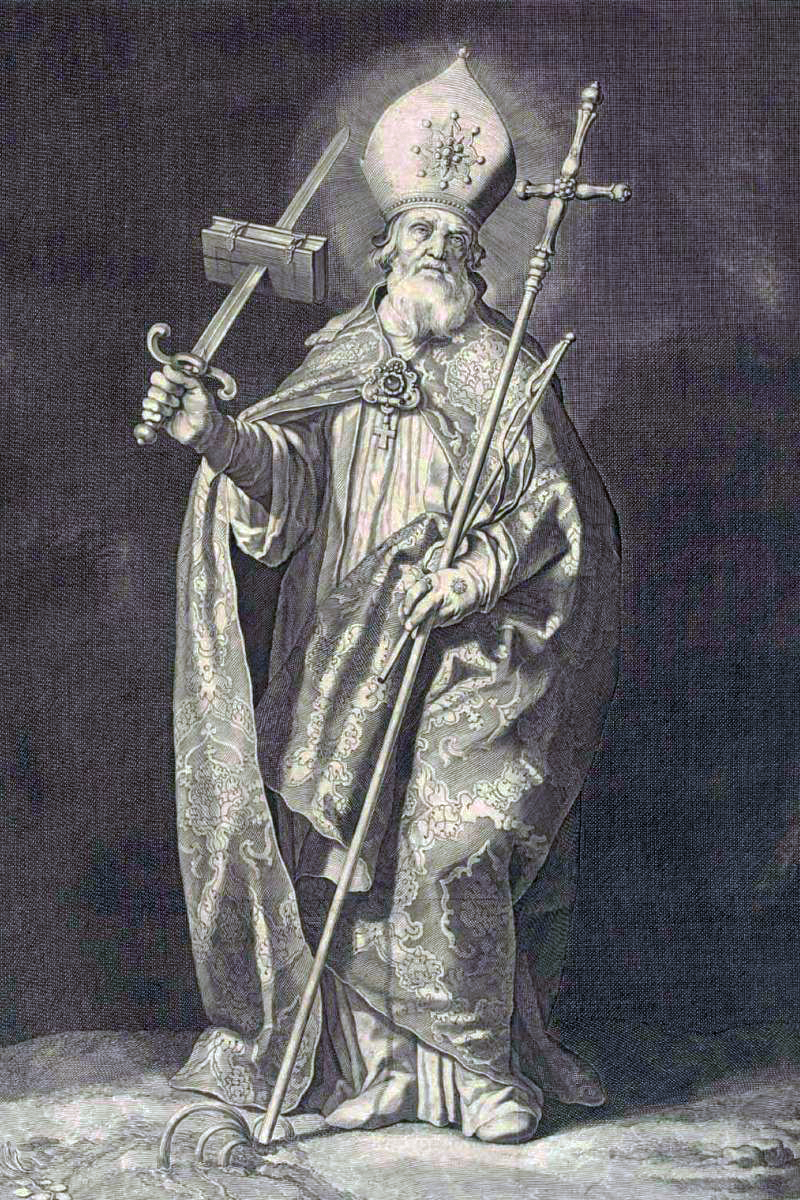
Boniface

- June 5
  - Boniface, Anglo-Saxon missionary
  - Eoban, bishop of Utrecht
- June 10 – Abul Abbas al-Saffah, Muslim caliph
- August 17 – Carloman mayor of the palace of Austrasia and brother of Pepin III (The Short)
- Ansemund, Visigothic count
- Burchard, bishop of Würzburg (approximate date)
- Childeric III, king of the Franks (approximate date)
- Cui Hao, Chinese poet
- Hiltrud, duchess regent of Bavaria (b. 716)
- Li Linfu, chancellor of the Tang dynasty
- Rhodri Molwynog, king of Gwynedd (Wales)

755

- Abd al-Rahman ibn Habib al-Fihri, Arab noble
- Abu Muslim Khorasani, Persian general
- Elisedd ap Gwylog, king of Powys (Wales)
- Sunpadh, Persian rebel leader
- Zhang Xuan, Chinese painter (b. 713)

756

- June 4 – Shōmu, emperor of Japan (b. 701)
- July 15 – Yang Guifei, consort of Xuan Zong (b. 719)
- Aistulf, duke of Friuli and king of the Lombards
- Cuthred, king of Wessex (approximate date)
- Dantidurga, founder of the Rashtrakuta Empire (b. 735)
- Feng Changqing, general of the Tang Dynasty
- Forggus mac Cellaig, king of Connacht (Ireland)
- Gao Xianzhi, general of the Tang Dynasty
- Ibn al-Muqaffa', Muslim writer (approximate date)
- Isaac I of Antioch, Syriac Orthodox Patriarch of Antioch.
- Wang Changling, Chinese poet and official (b. 698)
- Yang Guozhong, chancellor of the Tang Dynasty

757

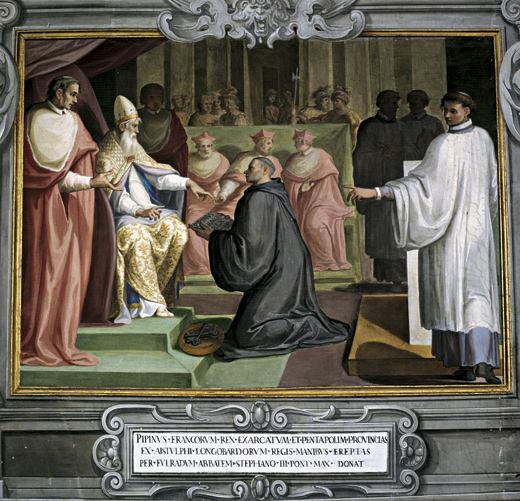
Pope Stephen II died on April 26, 757

- March 14 – Li Lin, prince of the Tang Dynasty
- April 26 – Stephen II, pope of the Catholic Church
- Æthelbald, king of Mercia
- Alfonso I, king of Asturias
- An Lushan, Chinese rebel leader
- Baldred of Tyninghame, Anglo-Saxon abbot
- Bertha of Bingen, German saint
- Crimhthann mac Reachtghal, Irish abbot
- Cummascach mac Flainn, king of Uí Failghe (Ireland)
- Geshu Han, general of the Tang Dynasty
- Habib ibn Abd al-Rahman al-Fihri, Arab noble
- Li Tan, prince of the Tang Dynasty
- Ono no Azumabito, Japanese official
- Sigeberht, king of Wessex
- Suibhne of Clonfert, Irish abbot
- Tachibana no Moroe, Japanese prince (b. 684)
- Tachibana no Naramaro, Japanese statesman (b. 721)
- Zhang Xun, general of the Tang Dynasty (b. 709)

758

- Beorna, king of East Anglia (approximate date)
- Chen Xilie, chancellor of the Tang Dynasty
- Swithred, king of Essex

759

- July 24 – Oswulf, king of Northumbria
- Edburga, Anglo-Saxon abbess
- Dúngal mac Amalgado, king of Brega (Ireland)
- Othmar, Swiss abbot (approximate date)
- Wang Wei, Chinese poet (b. 699)
