= Flainn =

Flainn is a surname. Notable people with the surname include:

- Aenghus Ua Flainn
- Ailill Corrach mac Flainn (died 741), king of the Uí Failge, a Laigin people of County Offaly
- Cináed mac Flainn (died 770), king of the Uí Failge, a Laigin people of County Offaly
- Conaing mac Flainn (died 849), King of Brega from the Uí Chonaing sept of Cnogba (Knowth) of the Síl nÁedo Sláine branch of the southern Ui Neill
- Cummascach mac Flainn (died 757), king of the Uí Failge, a Laigin people of County Offaly
- Donnchad Donn mac Flainn
- Fithceallach mac Flainn
- Flaithnia mac Flainn (died 755), king of the Uí Failge, a Laigin people of County Offaly
- Flann Mac Flainn
- Mugrón mac Flainn (died 782), king of the Uí Failge, a Laigin people of County Offaly
- Nicol Mac Flainn
- Ragnall Ua Flainn Chua
- Tóim Snáma mac Flainn (died 770), King of Osraige in modern County Kilkenny
- Ólchobar mac Flainn (died 796), supposed King of Munster from the Uí Fidgenti of County Limerick

== See also ==
- Emily Flain, a Northern Irish actress
- Flain, a character from animated TV series Mixels
- Flaine, a ski area in the French Alps
