= Cillíne mac Forannáin =

King of the Uí Failge

Cillíne mac Forannáin (died 652) was a king of the Uí Failge, a Laigin people of County Offaly. He was the great grandson of a brother (Máel Uma) of Áed Rón mac Cathail (died 604), a previous king.

He is listed as king in the Book of Leinster king list and is also mentioned in a poem in the genealogies about the royal fort at Rathangan, County Kildare. His exact reign dates are uncertain. Though listed after Ailill mac Áedo Róin (died 639) in the king list; the poem mentions a king named Conaing between their reigns.

He was slain in internal conflict among the Uí Failge at the Battle of Cúil Corra. He was apparently succeeded by a certain Máel Dúin. Eventually his nephew Fland Dá Chongal became king.

== See also ==
- Kings of Ui Failghe
