= 754 =

Calendar year

754 in various calendars
- Gregorian calendar: 754; DCCLIV
- Ab urbe condita: 1507
- Armenian calendar: 203; ԹՎ ՄԳ
- Assyrian calendar: 5504
- Balinese saka calendar: 675–676
- Bengali calendar: 160–161
- Berber calendar: 1704
- Buddhist calendar: 1298
- Burmese calendar: 116
- Byzantine calendar: 6262–6263
- Chinese calendar: 癸巳年 (Water Snake); 3451 or 3244 — to — 甲午年 (Wood Horse); 3452 or 3245
- Coptic calendar: 470–471
- Discordian calendar: 1920
- Ethiopian calendar: 746–747
- Hebrew calendar: 4514–4515
- Hindu calendars
- Vikram Samvat: 810–811
- Shaka Samvat: 675–676
- Kali Yuga: 3854–3855
- Holocene calendar: 10754
- Iranian calendar: 132–133
- Islamic calendar: 136–137
- Japanese calendar: Tenpyō-shōhō 6 (天平勝宝６年)
- Javanese calendar: 648–649
- Julian calendar: 754; DCCLIV
- Korean calendar: 3087
- Minguo calendar: 1158 before ROC 民前1158年
- Nanakshahi calendar: −714
- Seleucid era: 1065/1066 AG
- Thai solar calendar: 1296–1297
- Tibetan calendar: ཆུ་མོ་སྦྲུལ་ལོ་ (female Water-Snake); 880 or 499 or −273 — to — ཤིང་ཕོ་རྟ་ལོ་ (male Wood-Horse); 881 or 500 or −272

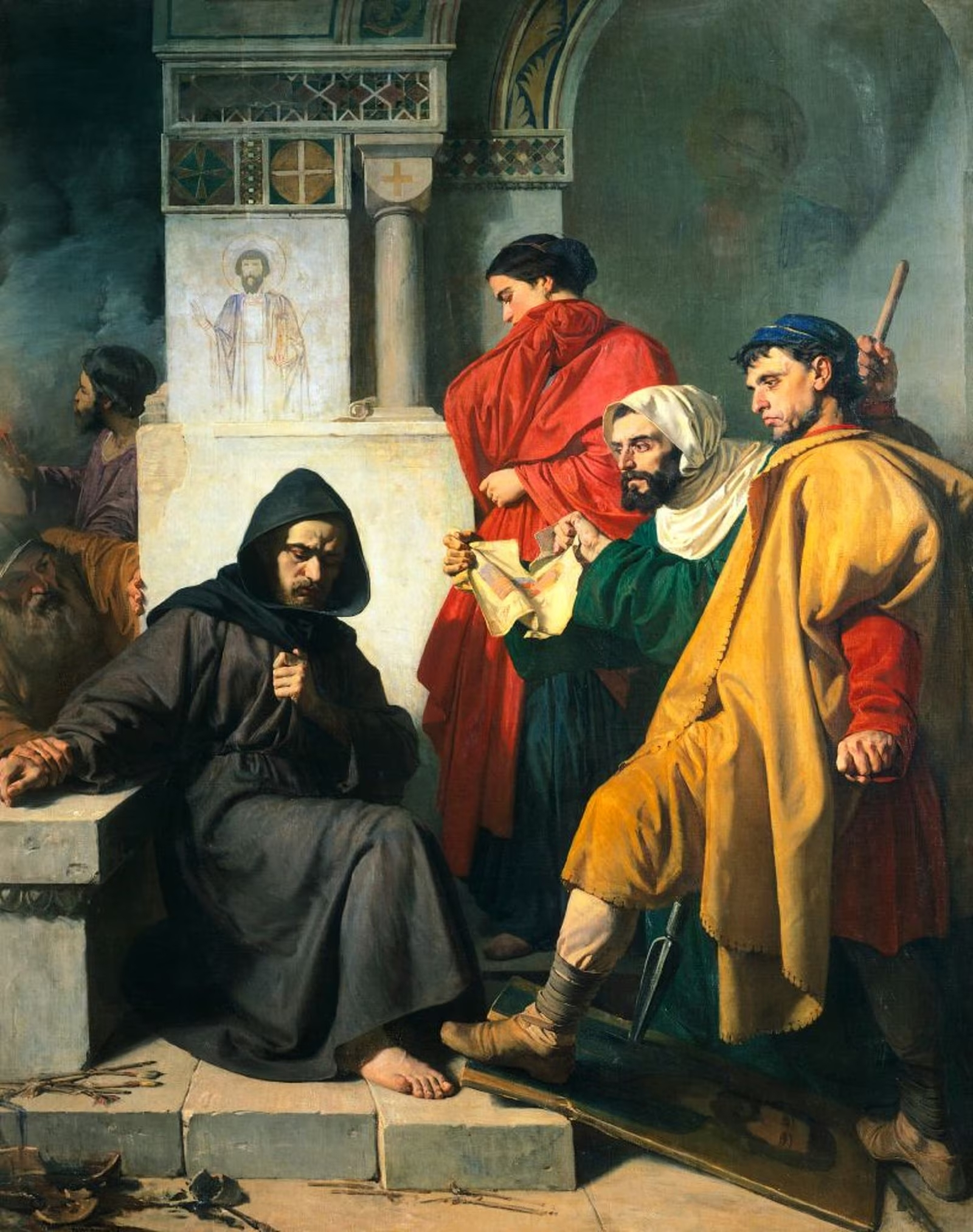
The Iconoclasts, by Domenico Morelli

Year 754 (DCCLIV) was a common year starting on Tuesday of the Julian calendar, the 754th year of the Common Era (CE) and Anno Domini (AD) designations, the 754th year of the 1st millennium, the 54th year of the 8th century, and the 5th year of the 750s decade. The denomination 754 for this year has been used since the early medieval period, when the Anno Domini calendar era became the prevalent method in Europe for naming years.

== Events ==
=== By place ===
==== Europe ====
- July – Stephen II anoints Pepin's sons, Charles (later known as Charlemagne) and Carloman, consecrating them as patricians. At Quierzy he proclaims the Carolingian dynasty holy, and appeals for help against the Lombards. Finally, the Frankish nobles give their consent to a campaign in Lombardy.
- July 28 – Pope Stephen II re-consecrates Pepin III (the Short) as king of the Franks, at the Basilica of Saint-Denis outside Paris, bestowing upon him the additional title of Patricius of the Romans. This marks the first recorded crowning of a civil ruler by a pope. Pepin assumes the role of ordained protector of the Catholic Church.
- Summer – The Franks under Pepin III invade Italy, and defeat the Lombards under King Aistulf, in the Susa Valley (Piedmont). He enforces the terms, including cession of the Exarchate of Ravenna to Rome.
- The oldest document mentioning the city of Ferrara (Northern Italy) is from this year (approximate date).

==== Abbasid Caliphate ====
- June 10 – Caliph as-Saffah dies of smallpox after a 4-year reign. He is succeeded by his nominated heir and brother al-Mansur, as ruler of the Abbasid Caliphate.

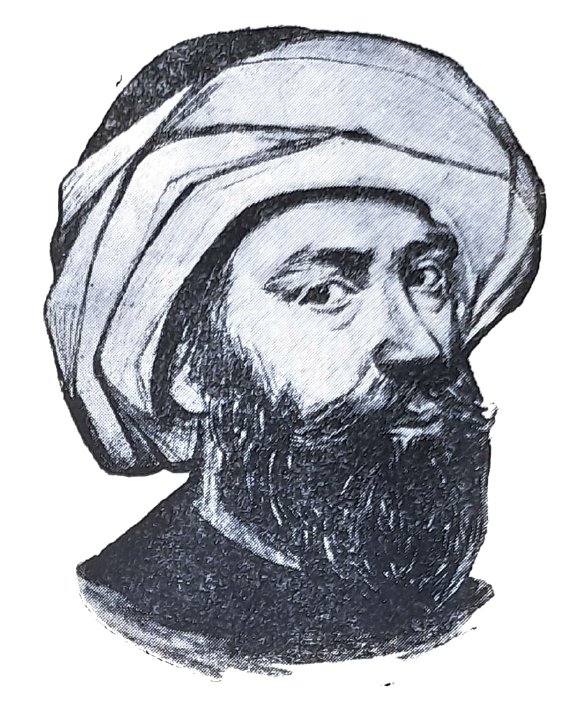
Abbasid caliph al-Mansur (r. 754–775)

- November – Abdallah ibn Ali, governor of Syria and uncle of as-Saffah, launches a claim for the caliphate, but is defeated by forces loyal to al-Mansur, under Abu Muslim, at Nisibis (modern Turkey).

==== Asia ====
- Jianzhen, Chinese Buddhist monk, arrives in Nara, where he is welcomed by former emperor Shōmu and empress Kōmyō. During his visit Jianzhen introduces sugar to the Japanese court, using it to mask the flavors of foul-tasting herbal tea.
- A Tang census shows that 75% of the Chinese live north of the Chang Jiang (Yangtze) River. The capital of Chang'an has a population of 2 million and more than 25 other cities have well over 500,000 citizens (approximate date).

=== By topic ===
==== Religion ====
- February – Council of Hieria: Emperor Constantine V summons a Christian council in the palace of Hieria in Constantinople. The council, under the presidency of Bishop Theodosius of Ephesus, supports the policy of Iconoclasm and condemning the use of religious images (icons) in the Byzantine Empire. Constantine increases the persecution of the monasteries; hundreds of monks and nuns are mutilated or put to death.
- June 5 – Boniface, Anglo-Saxon missionary, is killed by a band of pagans at Dokkum in Frisia, while reading the Scriptures to Christian converts. He is later buried in the Abbey of Fulda, entrusted to his Bavarian disciple Sturm.

== Births ==
- Li Fan, chancellor of the Tang dynasty (d. 811)

== Deaths ==
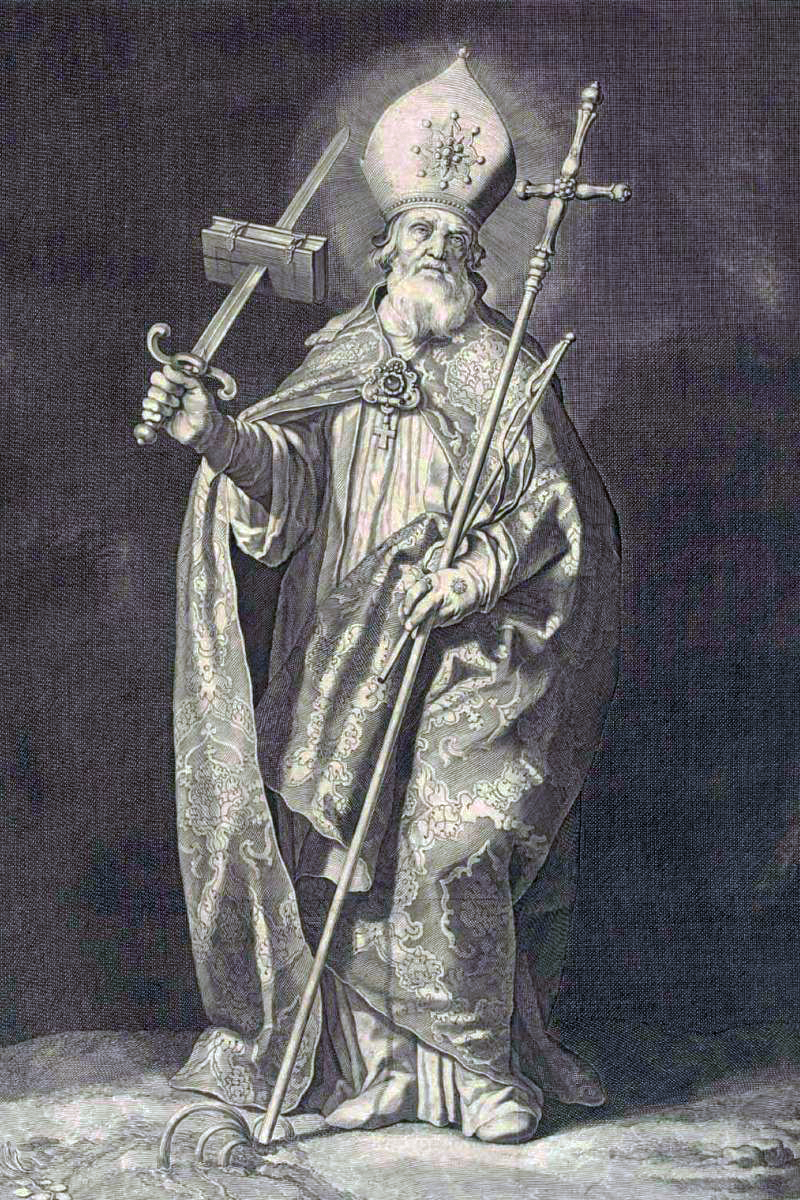
Boniface

- June 5
  - Boniface, Anglo-Saxon missionary
  - Eoban, bishop of Utrecht
- June 10 – Abul Abbas al-Saffah, Muslim caliph
- August 17 – Carloman mayor of the palace of Austrasia and brother of Pepin III (The Short)
- Ansemund, Visigothic count
- Burchard, bishop of Würzburg (approximate date)
- Childeric III, king of the Franks (approximate date)
- Cui Hao, Chinese poet
- Hiltrud, duchess regent of Bavaria (b. 716)
- Li Linfu, chancellor of the Tang dynasty
- Rhodri Molwynog, king of Gwynedd (Wales)
