= 753 =

Calendar year

753 in various calendars
Gregorian calendar	753; DCCLIII
Ab urbe condita	1506
Armenian calendar	202; ԹՎ ՄԲ
Assyrian calendar	5503
Balinese saka calendar	674–675
Bengali calendar	159–160
Berber calendar	1703
Buddhist calendar	1297
Burmese calendar	115
Byzantine calendar	6261–6262
Chinese calendar	壬辰年 (Water Dragon); 3450 or 3243 — to — 癸巳年 (Water Snake); 3451 or 3244
Coptic calendar	469–470
Discordian calendar	1919
Ethiopian calendar	745–746
Hebrew calendar	4513–4514
- Hindu calendars
Vikram Samvat	809–810
Shaka Samvat	674–675
Kali Yuga	3853–3854
Holocene calendar	10753
Iranian calendar	131–132
Islamic calendar	135–136
Japanese calendar	Tenpyō-shōhō 5 (天平勝宝５年)
Javanese calendar	647–648
Julian calendar	753; DCCLIII
Korean calendar	3086
Minguo calendar	1159 before ROC 民前1159年
Nanakshahi calendar	−715
Seleucid era	1064/1065 AG
Thai solar calendar	1295–1296
Tibetan calendar	ཆུ་ཕོ་འབྲུག་ལོ་ (male Water-Dragon); 879 or 498 or −274 — to — ཆུ་མོ་སྦྲུལ་ལོ་ (female Water-Snake); 880 or 499 or −273

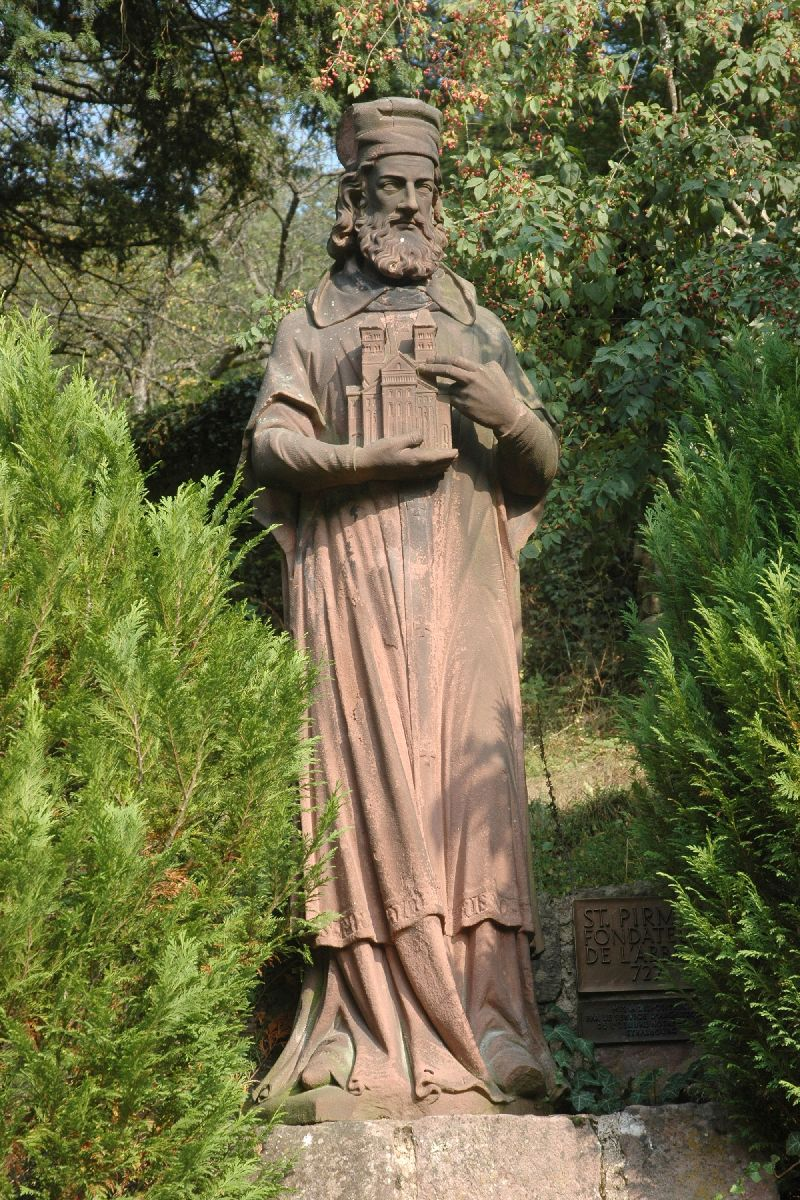
Pirmin (ca. 700–753) at Murbach Abbey

Year 753 (DCCLIII) was a common year starting on Monday of the Julian calendar. The denomination 753 for this year has been used since the early medieval period, when the Anno Domini calendar era became the prevalent method in Europe for naming years.

== Events ==
=== By place ===
==== Europe ====
- Grifo, Frankish duke and illegitimate son of Charles Martel, rebels against King Pepin III ("the Short") (his half-brother), in alliance with the Bretons. He flees to Italy to join King Aistulf of the Lombards, but is caught and killed while passing the Alps.
- The town of Staraja Ladoga (Northern Russia) is founded by Scandinavians. The settlement becomes a prosperous trading outpost for jewelry, casual items, craft tools and dress adornments (approximate date).
- Sevar, ruler (khagan) of the Bulgarian Empire, dies after a 15-year reign. He is succeeded by Kormisosh, who belongs to the Vokil clan (approximate date).

=== By topic ===
==== Religion ====
- Fall – Pope Stephen II travels to the Lombard capital of Pavia, for negotiations with Aistulf. His terms for returning the Exarchate of Ravenna are declined.
- November – Stephen II crosses the passes of the Alps to Gaul. He leaves Rome unprotected, under threat of a siege from the Lombards.
- Eoban is appointed bishop of Utrecht (modern Netherlands), by the missionary bishop Boniface.

== Births ==
- Xue Ping, general of the Tang Dynasty (approximate date)

== Deaths ==
- August 8 – Hildegar, bishop of Cologne
- November 3 – Pirmin, Visigothic abbot (b. c. 700), founder of many monasteries in the historical region of Alemannia
- Grifo, Frankish duke and son of Charles Martel (b. 726)
- Herlindis of Maaseik, Frankish abbess (or 745)
- Li Linfu, chancellor of the Tang Dynasty
- Sevar, ruler (khagan) of the Bulgarian Empire (approximate date)
