= Flaíthnia mac Cináeda =

Flaíthnia mac Cináeda (died 806) was a king of the Uí Failge, a Laigin people of County Offaly. He was the son of Cináed mac Flainn (died 770), a previous king. He ruled from 803 to 806.

The over king of Leinster Fínsnechta Cethardec mac Cellaig (died 808) was working to ensure his control of the church of Kildare which led to conflict with the Uí Failge. His predecessor Óengus mac Mugróin (died 803) had been assassinated by the orders of Finsnechta and in 806, Flaíthnia was himself assassinated at his royal fort at Ráith Imgáin (Rathangan, County Kildare). This was probably also the work of Finsnechta.

== See also ==
- Kings of Ui Failghe
