= 756 =

Calendar year

756 in various calendars
- Gregorian calendar: 756; DCCLVI
- Ab urbe condita: 1509
- Armenian calendar: 205; ԹՎ ՄԵ
- Assyrian calendar: 5506
- Balinese saka calendar: 677–678
- Bengali calendar: 162–163
- Berber calendar: 1706
- Buddhist calendar: 1300
- Burmese calendar: 118
- Byzantine calendar: 6264–6265
- Chinese calendar: 乙未年 (Wood Goat); 3453 or 3246 — to — 丙申年 (Fire Monkey); 3454 or 3247
- Coptic calendar: 472–473
- Discordian calendar: 1922
- Ethiopian calendar: 748–749
- Hebrew calendar: 4516–4517
- Hindu calendars
- Vikram Samvat: 812–813
- Shaka Samvat: 677–678
- Kali Yuga: 3856–3857
- Holocene calendar: 10756
- Iranian calendar: 134–135
- Islamic calendar: 138–139
- Japanese calendar: Tenpyō-shōhō 8 (天平勝宝８年)
- Javanese calendar: 650–651
- Julian calendar: 756; DCCLVI
- Korean calendar: 3089
- Minguo calendar: 1156 before ROC 民前1156年
- Nanakshahi calendar: −712
- Seleucid era: 1067/1068 AG
- Thai solar calendar: 1298–1299
- Tibetan calendar: ཤིང་མོ་ལུག་ལོ་ (female Wood-Sheep); 882 or 501 or −271 — to — མེ་ཕོ་སྤྲེ་ལོ་ (male Fire-Monkey); 883 or 502 or −270

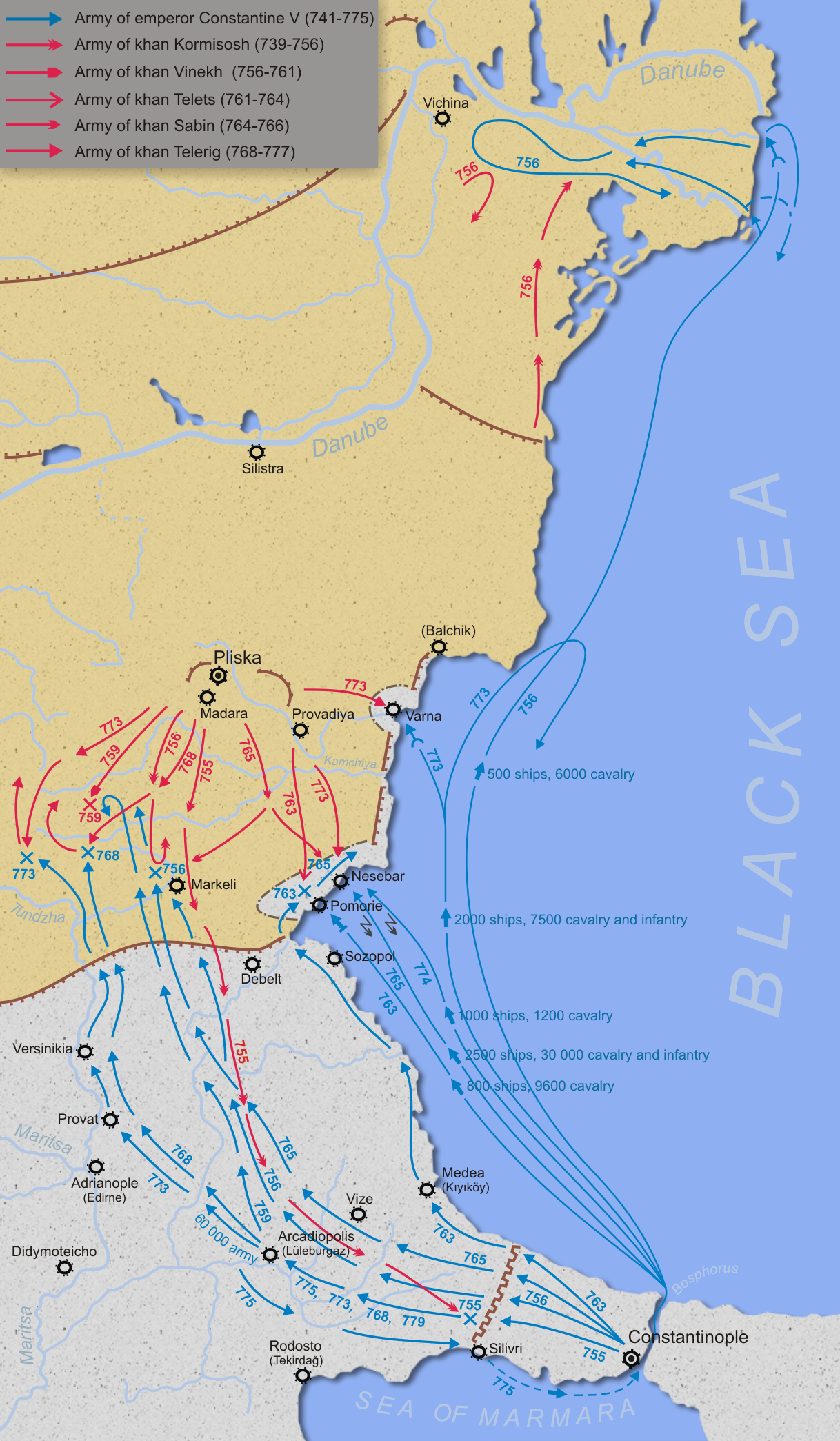
The Byzantine–Bulgarian Wars (741–775)

Year 756 (DCCLVI) was a leap year starting on Thursday of the Julian calendar, the 756th year of the Common Era (CE) and Anno Domini (AD) designations, the 756th year of the 1st millennium, the 56th year of the 8th century, and the 7th year of the 750s decade. The denomination 756 for this year has been used since the early medieval period, when the Anno Domini calendar era became the prevalent method in Europe for naming years.

== Events ==
=== By place ===
==== Byzantine Empire ====
- Byzantine–Bulgarian War: Emperor Constantine V builds a series of fortifications along the Byzantine frontier on the Danube, and starts settling Christian Armenians and Syrians in the Thracesian Theme. In response, Kormisosh, ruler (khagan) of the Bulgarian Empire, demands the payment of tribute. Constantine refuses, and the Bulgars raid into Thrace, reaching the Anastasian Wall stretching between the Black Sea and the Sea of Marmara (near the outskirts of Constantinople).
- Battle of Marcellae: Constantine V sends a Byzantine expeditionary force (500 ships and 6,000 cavalry) to Thrace, and defeats the Bulgars around the Danube Delta and near the fortress city of Markeli (modern Bulgaria). Kormisosh is forced to accept a peace treaty, and confirms the existing frontier. Due to the constant political crisis, the Bulgarian Empire is on the verge of destruction. Kormisosh is deposed during a palace coup and succeeded by Vinekh, a member of the Vokil clan.

==== Europe ====
- King Aistulf of the Lombards again threatens Rome with a view to making it his capital, but the Franks under Pepin III ("the Short") arrives with his sons Charles and Carloman, defeats Aistulf, and confers the Donation of Pepin, which establishes the Papal States (including the lands of Ravenna and the Pentapolis). Pepin has taken territory that legally belongs to the Byzantine Empire; he gives it to Pope Stephen II.
- Aistulf dies in a hunting accident, and is succeeded by Desiderius as king of the Lombards. Ex-king Ratchis attempts unsuccessfully to seize the throne, but is opposed by Stephen II.
- Galla Gaulo is deposed, blinded and exiled. He is succeeded by Domenico Monegario as the sixth doge of Venice. During his reign Venetian maritime traders become increasingly active.
- May – Prince Abd al-Rahman I and his followers capture the city of Seville without violence. He defeats Yusuf ibn 'Abd al-Rahman al-Fihri in a battle for control of the Muslim-ruled parts of the Iberian Peninsula (al-Andalus). Abd al-Rahman establishes the Emirate of Córdoba. During his reign trade and culture flourish, along with the construction of Islamic architecture (including the Great Mosque of Córdoba).

==== Britain ====
- Battle of Newanbirig: Kings Óengus I of the Picts and Eadberht of Northumbria attack King Dumnagual III of Strathclyde, at Dumbarton Castle (modern Scotland). However, Eadberht's entire force is subsequently wiped out, probably by the Britons.
- King Cuthred of Wessex dies after a 16-year reign. He is succeeded by his distant kinsman Sigeberht.

==== Chinese Empire ====
- January 18 – An Lushan Rebellion: The eastern capital of Luoyang falls to the 200,000-strong army of the rebel general An Lushan, who defeats loyalist forces under Feng Changqing. The rebels cross the Yellow River, and march on to capture the cities Chenliu and Yingyang (modern Zhengzhou, Henan).
- Battle of Yongqiu: A Tang garrison (2,000 men), under Zhang Xun, successfully defend their fortress against the rebel army at Yongqiu. Zhang achieves a victory after a 4-month siege, and prevents the rebels from capturing the fertile Tang territory south of the Huai River.
- February 5 – An Lushan declares himself emperor at Luoyang, establishing a new empire, called the Great Yan. He pushes on towards the primary Tang capital at Chang'an (now Xi'an). An decides to seize southern China, to cut off loyalist reinforcements. Meanwhile, numerous soldiers join the rebellion.
- May – Emperor Xuan Zong hires 4,000 Muslim mercenaries to help defend Chang'an against the rebels. Loyalist forces take defensible positions in the mountain passes, but chancellor Yang Guozhong gives orders for them to leave their posts.
- July 7 (Note: Others date it on July 9)– An Lushan crushes the Tang troops at the Tong Pass, leaving the road to the capital wide open.
- July 14 – Xuan Zong flees the capital of Chang'an (along with the imperial court) for Sichuan, as rebel forces advance through the Tongguan Pass toward the city. Meanwhile, An Lushan is ailing, perhaps with diabetes. He is nearly blind and suffers from extreme irascibility.
- July 15 – Xuan Zong is ordered by his Imperial Guards to execute Yang Guozhong, by forcing him to commit suicide or face a mutiny. He permits his consort Yang Guifei to be strangled by his chief eunuch. An Lushan also has other members of the emperor's family killed.
- August 12 – Xuan Zong abdicates the throne after a 44-year reign. He is succeeded by his son Su Zong, as emperor of the Tang Dynasty. He hires 22,000 Muslim mercenaries to reinforce his decimated army at Lingzhou.
- November 19 – Tang General Fang Guan is defeated at Xianyang. The imperial forces consisted of two thousand oxcarts with cavalry and foot soldiers on two fronts, but the rebels took advantage of their upwind position and attacked with fire. Imperial forces killed or wounded numbered more than 40,000 men.

==== Japan ====
- June 4 – Emperor Shōmu (retired since 749) dies at Nara. His wife Kōmyō dedicates over 600 items to the Great Buddha, and donates large sums of money to the Shōsō-in treasure (storehouse) in Tōdai-ji.

== Births ==
- Abo of Tiflis, Christian martyr (approximate date)
- Abu Nuwas, Muslim poet (d. 814)
- Fujiwara no Uchimaro, Japanese nobleman (d. 812)
- Hisham I, Muslim emir of Córdoba (d. 796)
- Ibrahim I, Muslim emir of the Aghlabids (d. 812)
- Ismail ibn Ibrahim, Muslim scholar (d. 810)
- Li Yijian, chancellor of the Tang Dynasty (d. 822)
- Nikephoros, son of Constantine V (or 758)

== Deaths ==
- June 4 – Shōmu, emperor of Japan (b. 701)
- July 15 – Yang Guifei, consort of Xuan Zong (b. 719)
- Aistulf, duke of Friuli and king of the Lombards
- Cuthred, king of Wessex (approximate date)
- Dantidurga, founder of the Rashtrakuta Empire (b. 735)
- Feng Changqing, general of the Tang Dynasty
- Forggus mac Cellaig, king of Connacht (Ireland)
- Gao Xianzhi, general of the Tang Dynasty
- Isaac I of Antioch, Syriac Orthodox Patriarch of Antioch.
- Wang Changling, Chinese poet and official (b. 698)
- Yang Guozhong, chancellor of the Tang Dynasty
