= Maolmórdha =

Maolmórdha may refer to:

- Máel Mórda mac Murchada (died 1014), King of the province of Leinster in Ireland
- Mael Morda mac Conchobair (12th century), king of Uí Failghe
- Mael Morda mac Muirchertaig meic Donnchada (reign ?–1225), king of Uí Failghe
- Muirchertach mac Mael Morda (reign 1225–?), king of Uí Failghe
