= Domnall mac Flaíthnia =

Domnall mac Flaíthnia (died 783) was a king of the Uí Failge, a Laigin people of County Offaly. He was the son of Flaithnia mac Flainn (died 755), a previous king. He ruled from 782 to 783.

His predecessor and uncle Mugrón mac Flainn (died 782) had been slain in battle versus his overlord the King of Leinster. In 783 Domnall was killed in captivity in Cloncurry, County Kildare. The exact circumstances are unknown.

== See also ==
- Kings of Ui Failghe
