= Imperial Guard =

An imperial guard is a special group of troops of an empire.

Imperial Guard(s) may refer to:

- Guards Corps (German Empire) of the Prussian, and later of the Imperial German Army
- Imperial Guard (Iran)
- Imperial Guard (Japan)
- Imperial Guard (Napoleon I)
- Imperial Guard (Napoleon III)
- Imperial Guards (Tang dynasty)
- Imperial Guards (Qing dynasty)
- Imperial Guard (Russia)

== Fictional ==
- Imperial Guard (Marvel Comics)
- Imperial Guard (Warhammer 40,000)
