= Flaithnia mac Flainn =

Flaithnia mac Flainn (died 755) was a king of the Uí Failge, a Laigin people of County Offaly. He was one of the many sons of Fland Dá Chongal, a previous king. He ruled from 741 to 755.

His predecessor and half-brother Ailill Corrach mac Flainn was killed in 741 but the circumstances are not given. Nothing is recorded of Flaithnia in the annals other than his death obit.

His son Domnall mac Flaíthnia (died 783) was a king of the Uí Failge.

== See also ==
- Kings of Ui Failghe
