= Forbassach Ua Congaile =

8th-century Irish monarch

Forbassach Ua Congaile (died 714) was a king of the Uí Failge, a Laigin people of County Offaly.

The king lists in the Book of Leinster give him a reign of three years, giving a possible reign of 711–714. He was related to his predecessor Fland Dá Chongal but the exact relationship is unclear. The Uí Failge had a traditional hostility to the rulers of Uisnech. In 714 he took advantage of the attack by the Síl nÁedo Sláine on Murchad Midi of Uisnech to attack Meath. However, he was defeated and slain by the men of Meath at the Battle of Garbsalach.

The descendants of Fland Dá Chongal, known as the Uí Flaind, dominated the kingship after his death.

== See also ==
- Kings of Ui Failghe
