= Cináed mac Mugróin =

Cináed mac Mugróin (died 829) was a king of the Uí Failge, a Laigin people of County Offaly, Ireland. He was the son of Mugrón mac Flainn (died 782), a previous king. He ruled from 806 to 826.

Nothing is recorded of his reign in the annals other than his death date. His descendants were known as Clann Cináeda. His son Riacáin was ancestor of the Uí Riacáin sept (Hy-Regan). His son Niall mac Cináeda (died 849) was a King of the Uí Failge.

== See also ==
- Kings of Ui Failghe
