= 760 =

Calendar year

760 in various calendars
- Gregorian calendar: 760; DCCLX
- Ab urbe condita: 1513
- Armenian calendar: 209; ԹՎ ՄԹ
- Assyrian calendar: 5510
- Balinese saka calendar: 681–682
- Bengali calendar: 166–167
- Berber calendar: 1710
- Buddhist calendar: 1304
- Burmese calendar: 122
- Byzantine calendar: 6268–6269
- Chinese calendar: 己亥年 (Earth Pig); 3457 or 3250 — to — 庚子年 (Metal Rat); 3458 or 3251
- Coptic calendar: 476–477
- Discordian calendar: 1926
- Ethiopian calendar: 752–753
- Hebrew calendar: 4520–4521
- Hindu calendars
- Vikram Samvat: 816–817
- Shaka Samvat: 681–682
- Kali Yuga: 3860–3861
- Holocene calendar: 10760
- Iranian calendar: 138–139
- Islamic calendar: 142–143
- Japanese calendar: Tenpyō-hōji 4 (天平宝字４年)
- Javanese calendar: 654–655
- Julian calendar: 760; DCCLX
- Korean calendar: 3093
- Minguo calendar: 1152 before ROC 民前1152年
- Nanakshahi calendar: −708
- Seleucid era: 1071/1072 AG
- Thai solar calendar: 1302–1303
- Tibetan calendar: ས་མོ་ཕག་ལོ་ (female Earth-Boar); 886 or 505 or −267 — to — ལྕགས་ཕོ་བྱི་བ་ལོ་ (male Iron-Rat); 887 or 506 or −266

Pepin's expedition to Septimania and Aquitaine

Year 760 (DCCLX) was a leap year starting on Tuesday of the Julian calendar. The denomination 760 for this year has been used since the early medieval period, when the Anno Domini (AD) calendar era became the prevalent method in Europe for naming years.

== Events ==
=== By place ===
==== Europe ====
- Frankish King Pepin III ("the Short") begins his expedition to Septimania and Aquitaine. He conquers the cities of Carcassonne, Toulouse, Rodez and Albi. Duke Waifer of Aquitaine confiscates the Church lands, and plunders Burgundy. Pepin invades Aquitanian-held Berry and the Auvergne, capturing the fortresses of Bourbon and Clermont. Waifer's Basque troops are defeated by the Franks, and deported into northern France with their children and wives.

==== Britain ====
- Battle of Hereford: The Welsh kingdoms of Brycheiniog, Gwent and Powys defeat the Mercians under King Offa at Hereford. They free themselves from the influence of the Anglo-Saxons.
- Offa's Dyke is constructed around this time, according to the traditional history of this defensive earthwork. This 150-mile-long (240-kilometer) earthwork marks the current border with the Welsh kingdoms, between England and Wales (approximate date). However, modern analysis of Offa's Dyke suggests that it was built in the 5th century, well before the reign of King Offa.

==== China ====
- Former emperor Xuanzong is placed under house arrest by the eunuch official Li Fuguo, with the support of Xuanzong's son, Suzong. Li Fuguo is appointed commander of the Imperial Guards, possessing nearly absolute power during Suzong's reign.
- The Kingdom of Nanzhao (Nanchao) in modern-day southern China expands into the Irrawaddy River region, first into Burma, then down into northern Laos and Thailand (approximate date).
- Lu Yu begins writing The Classic of Tea.

==== Mesoamerica ====
- The Maya city of Dos Pilas (modern Guatemala) is abandoned, after the Tamarindito and Petexbatún centres revolt against their Dos Pilas overlord.

=== By topic ===
==== Religion ====
- The Church of Santa Sophia is founded by the Lombard duke Arechis II in Benevento (approximate date).
- The Kailasa Temple is built on the orders of King Krishna I, of the Rashtrakuta Dynasty (modern India) (approximate date).
- Bregowine is appointed archbishop of Canterbury in England.

== Births ==
- Angilbert, Frankish diplomat and abbot (approximate date)
- Fujiwara no Otomuro, Japanese empress consort (d. 790)
- Jonas, bishop of Orléans (approximate date)
- Sibawayh, Persian linguist and grammarian (approximate date)
- Theodulf, bishop of Orléans (approximate date)
- Theophanes the Confessor, Byzantine monk (or 758)
- Thomas the Slav, Byzantine general (approximate date)
- Wei Guanzhi, Chinese chancellor (d. 821)
- Zhang Hongjing, Chinese chancellor (d. 824)

== Deaths ==
- October 26 – Cuthbert, archbishop of Canterbury
- Dumnagual III, king of Alt Clut (Scotland)
- Gangulphus, Burgundian courtier
- Kōmyō, empress of Japan (b. 701)
- Liutprand, duke of Benevento (approximate date)
- Muiredach mac Murchado, king of Leinster (Ireland)
- Wu Daozi, Chinese painter (approximate date)
