= Áed Rón mac Cathail =

Áed Rón mac Cathail (died 604) was a king of the Uí Failge, a Laigin people of County Offaly. He was the grandson of Bruidge mac Nath Í (died 579), a previous king.

He is listed as king in the Book of Leinster king list though incorrectly as Aed Róin mac Falge Ruit. He is also mentioned in a poem in the genealogies about the royal fort at Rathangan, County Kildare. His father Cathal mac Bruidgi was also mentioned as king in this poem but is not in the king list or annals.

Áed took the side of the Síl nÁedo Sláine branch versus the Clann Cholmáin in the feud among the southern Ui Neill. As a result he was slain in 604 on the same day as Áed Sláine in the interests of Conall Guthbinn (died 635), king of Uisnech.

His son Ailill mac Áedo Róin was a king of the Uí Failge. However future kings were to descend from his brother Máel Uma.

== See also ==
- Kings of Ui Failghe
