= List of kings of Uí Failghe =

Uí Failghe seems to have existed as a kingdom in Ireland since at least the early historic era, and successfully fought off encroachments by the Uí Néill, the Eóganachta, and most especially the Normans. From the mid eleventh century its dynasty adopted the surname Ua Conchobhair Failghe, or O Connor Faly (they were unrelated to the other notable Ua Conchobhair dynasties of Connacht and Kerry). Their seat was originally in Rathangan, County Kildare but moved to Daingean with the Norman arrival.

In the 1530s Brian supported the revolt of Silken Thomas; on his defeat he was pardoned and was given the title "Baron of Offaly".

On the death of the last de facto king, and de jure baron, Brian mac Cathaoir O Conchobhair Failghe, in about 1556, Uí Failghe was split between the modern day counties of King's County (Offaly), Queen's County (Laois) and County Kildare by Mary I of England during the Plantations of Ireland. Two Baronies in County Kildare, Offaly East and Offaly West, retained the anglicised name of the Kingdom. Upon Irish independence King's County was renamed as County Offaly.

== Early kings ==
- Failge Berraide (flourished 507-514)
- Bruidge mac Nath Í (died 579)
- Áed Rón mac Cathail (died 604)
- Ailill mac Áedo Róin (died 639)
- Cillíne mac Forannáin (died 652)
- Fland Dá Chongal
- Forbassach Ua Congaile (died 714)
- Ailill Corrach mac Flainn (died 741)
- Flaithnia mac Flainn (died 755)
- Cummascach mac Flainn (died 757)
- Cináed mac Flainn (died 770)
- Mugrón mac Flainn (died 782).
- Domnall mac Flaíthnia (died 783)
- Óengus mac Mugróin (died 803)
- Flaíthnia mac Cináeda (died 806)
- Cináed mac Mugróin (died 829)
- Mugrón mac Óengusa (d.842)
- Niall mac Cináeda (d.849)
- Máel Sinchill mac Mugróin (d.881)
- Conchobar mac Flannacáin (d.891)
- Uathmarán mac Conchobair (d.897)

== Later kings c.1051-c.1556 ==
- Congalach Ua Conchobair, d. 1051
- Gilla Patraic mac Conchobair Ua Sibleain, 1051-1071
- Conchobar mac Congalaig, 1071-1115
- Muirchertach, ?-1095
- Rogan mac Domnaill meic Conchobair, 1115-c.1118
- Cu Faifne mac Congalaig, c.1118-1130
- Donnchad mac Con Faifne, 1130-1134
- Aed mac Domnaill, 1134-????
- Mael Morda mac Conchobair
- Conchobair mac Con Faifne
- Mael Sechlainn mac Conchobair
- Congalach mac Con Faifne
- Murchad mac Con Faifne
- Muirchertach mac Muirchertaig (Int Athchlerch), ????-c.1151
- Aed mac Donnchada (Gilla na Findmona), c.1151-1159
- Domnall Ruad mac Congalaig, 1159-1161
- Mael Sechlainn mac Congalaig, 1161-1164
- Donchad Ruad Roigne, 1164-????
- Diarmait mac Congalaig,
- Muirchertach mac Congalaig, ????-1169?
- Diarmait mac Con Broga Ua Dimmusaig, after 1172-1193
- Muirchertach mac Brian, fl. 1212
- Mael Morda mac Muirchertaig meic Donnchada, ????-1225
- Muirchertach mac Mael Morda, 1225-????
- Muirchertach mac Muirchertaig, ????-c. 13 June 1305
- Murchad mac Muirchertaig, 1305-????
- Mael Sechlainn mac Muirchertaig, ????-1329
- Muirchertach Óg mac Muircherartaig, ????-1384
- Murchad mac Muircheartaig Óg, 1384-1421
- Diarmaid mac Muirchertaigh Óg, 1421-c. 1425
- An Calbhach Mór mac Murchada, c. 1425-1458 (see Máireg Béan Ó Conchubhair Fáilghe)
- Conn mac an Chalbhaig, 1458-autumn 1474
- Cathaoir mac Cuinn, 1474-1511
- Brian mac Taidhg meic an Chalbhaigh, 1511-1517
- An Calbhach mac Taidhg, 1517-c. 1525
- Brian mac Cathaoir, c. 1525 - c. 1556 (created Baron Offaly in 1538; title forfeited in 1550)
- Cathal O'Connor Faly, Brian's son, claimed the title Lord of Offaly and was considered as such by the Spanish, though the English never recognised him as such.

== See also ==
- Irish kings
- Gaelic Ireland

== Sources ==
- Book of Leinster: Section 28, Rig Hua Falge hosted by University College Cork CELT project.
- "O'Connor Faly: O Conchobhair Failghe, Kings of Uí Failghe, a.1051-c.1556", page 217-18, "A New History of Ireland", volume nine, Oxford, 1984.
- Mac Niocaill, Gearoid (1972), Ireland before the Vikings, Dublin: Gill and Macmillan
