= Óengus mac Mugróin =

Irish local king (died 803)

Óengus mac Mugróin (died 803) was a king of the Uí Failge, a Laigin people of County Offaly. He was the son of Mugrón mac Flainn (died 782), a previous king. He ruled from 783 to 803.

A conflict within the Uí Failge led to a slaughter in 789 at Cluain Ferta Mongáin (Kilclonfert, County Offaly) by Óengus at which his cousin Áed mac Tomaltaig was slain (their fathers were brothers). In 803 he was treacherously killed by the followers of Fínsnechta Cethardec mac Cellaig (died 808), over king of Leinster. Finsnechta was ensuring his control of the church of Kildare which led to conflict with the Uí Failge.

His grandson Máel Sinchill mac Mugróin (died 881) was a King of the Uí Failge.

== See also ==
- Kings of Ui Failghe
