= Fland Dá Chongal =

Fland Dá Chongal or Flann Ua Congaile (flourished late 7th century) was a king of the Uí Failge, a Laigin people of County Offaly.

Fland is not mentioned in the annals of Ireland but appears in king lists and genealogies. The king lists in the Book of Leinster place his reign before Cillíne mac Forannáin (died 652), however the death obits of his sons would place his reign later. He was most likely a contemporary of Cellach Cualann (died 715), king of Leinster and the predecessor of Forbassach Ua Congaile (died 714). Forbasach ruled for three years, according to the Book of Leinster, and Fland for fourteen years which gives a possible reign of 697–711 for Fland.

Fland was the great great grandson of a brother of Áed Róin mac Cathail (died 604), a previous king. Fland had twelve children by at least three different wives:

- by Érenach, daughter of Murchad Midi (died 715) of Uisnech: Mugrón mac Flainn (died 782), King of Uí Failge; Cináed mac Flainn (died 770), King of Uí Failge; Cummascach mac Flainn (died 757), King of Uí Failge; Flaithbertach
- by a daughter of a certain Fland Léna: Tomaltach, Indrechtach, Írgalach, Cathassach
- by a woman of the Uí Dúnlainge branch of the Laigin: Cairpre, Flaithnia mac Flainn (died 755), a King of Uí Failge, Cellach (died 770), Máel Fuataich
- other sons included Ailill Corrach mac Flainn (died 741), King of Uí Failge; Óengus

Four of Fland's sons were slain at the Battle of Áth Senaig in 738 when the men of Leinster were crushed by the high king Áed Allán. fland's descendants were known as the Uí Flaind.

== See also ==
- Kings of Ui Failghe
