= Hildegar (bishop of Cologne) =

Hildegar (also Hildiger or Hildeger; died 8 August 753) was the bishop of Cologne from 750. Probably of noble birth, he was a supporter of the Carolingians, who displaced the Merovingians in 751.

After the appointment of Eoban to the diocese of Utrecht by the missionary bishop Boniface, Hildegar claimed metropolitan rights over the see. Boniface denied the charge in a letter to Pope Stephen II, although Marco Mostert has indicated that Boniface's narrative and arguments are flawed, if not outright lies.

After a group of Saxons ravaged Francia, burning thirty churches, King Pippin the Short led a punitive expedition with "a large siege train" (magno apparatu) against them. Hildegar took part in the war and died defending the fortress (castrum) of Juberg or Iburg (Ihburg) near Osnabrück. He was probably commanding the levies of Cologne as a garrison.

== Sources ==
- Bachrach, Bernard (2001). Early Carolingian Warfare: Prelude to Empire. Philadelphia: University of Pennsylvania Press.
- Collins, Roger (1998). Charlemagne. Toronto: University of Toronto Press.
- Farmer, David, ed. (2011). "Cunibert of Cologne". The Oxford Dictionary of Saints (5th rev. ed.). Oxford: Oxford University Press. pp. 107–08.
- Hines, John (2003). "The Conversion of the Old Saxons". In Green, D. H.; Siegmund, F. (eds.). The Continental Saxons from the Migration Period to the Tenth Century: An Ethnographic Perspective. Woodbridge: Boydell. pp. 299–313.
- Knibbs, Eric (2011). Ansgar, Rimbert, and the Forged Foundations of Hamburg-Bremen. Farnham: Ashgate.
- Mostert, Marco (1995). "Bonifatius als Geschiedvervalser". Madoc: Tijdschrift voor Mediëvistiek. 9 (1): 213–21.
- Petersen, Leif Inge Ree (2013). Siege Warfare and Military Organization in the Successor States (400–800 AD): Byzantium, the West and Islam. Leiden: Brill.
