= Ailill mac Áedo Róin =

King of the Uí Failge

Ailill mac Áedo Róin (died 639) was a king of the Uí Failge, a Laigin people of County Offaly. He was the son of Áed Rón mac Cathail (died 604), a previous king.

He is listed as king in the Book of Leinster king list and is also mentioned in a poem in the genealogies about the royal fort at Rathangan, County Kildare. He may have ruled from 604 to 639.

The annals only record his death date.

== See also ==
- Kings of Ui Failghe
