= 726 =

Calendar year

726 in various calendars
| Gregorian calendar | 726; DCCXXVI |
| Ab urbe condita | 1479 |
| Armenian calendar | 175; ԹՎ ՃՀԵ |
| Assyrian calendar | 5476 |
| Balinese saka calendar | 647–648 |
| Bengali calendar | 132–133 |
| Berber calendar | 1676 |
| Buddhist calendar | 1270 |
| Burmese calendar | 88 |
| Byzantine calendar | 6234–6235 |
| Chinese calendar | 乙丑年 (Wood Ox); 3423 or 3216 — to — 丙寅年 (Fire Tiger); 3424 or 3217 |
| Coptic calendar | 442–443 |
| Discordian calendar | 1892 |
| Ethiopian calendar | 718–719 |
| Hebrew calendar | 4486–4487 |
- Hindu calendars
| Vikram Samvat | 782–783 |
| Shaka Samvat | 647–648 |
| Kali Yuga | 3826–3827 |
| Holocene calendar | 10726 |
| Iranian calendar | 104–105 |
| Islamic calendar | 107–108 |
| Japanese calendar | Jinki 3 (神亀３年) |
| Javanese calendar | 619–620 |
| Julian calendar | 726; DCCXXVI |
| Korean calendar | 3059 |
| Minguo calendar | 1186 before ROC 民前1186年 |
| Nanakshahi calendar | −742 |
| Seleucid era | 1037/1038 AG |
| Thai solar calendar | 1268–1269 |
| Tibetan calendar | ཤིང་མོ་གླང་ལོ་ (female Wood-Ox); 852 or 471 or −301 — to — མེ་ཕོ་སྟག་ལོ་ (male Fire-Tiger); 853 or 472 or −300 |

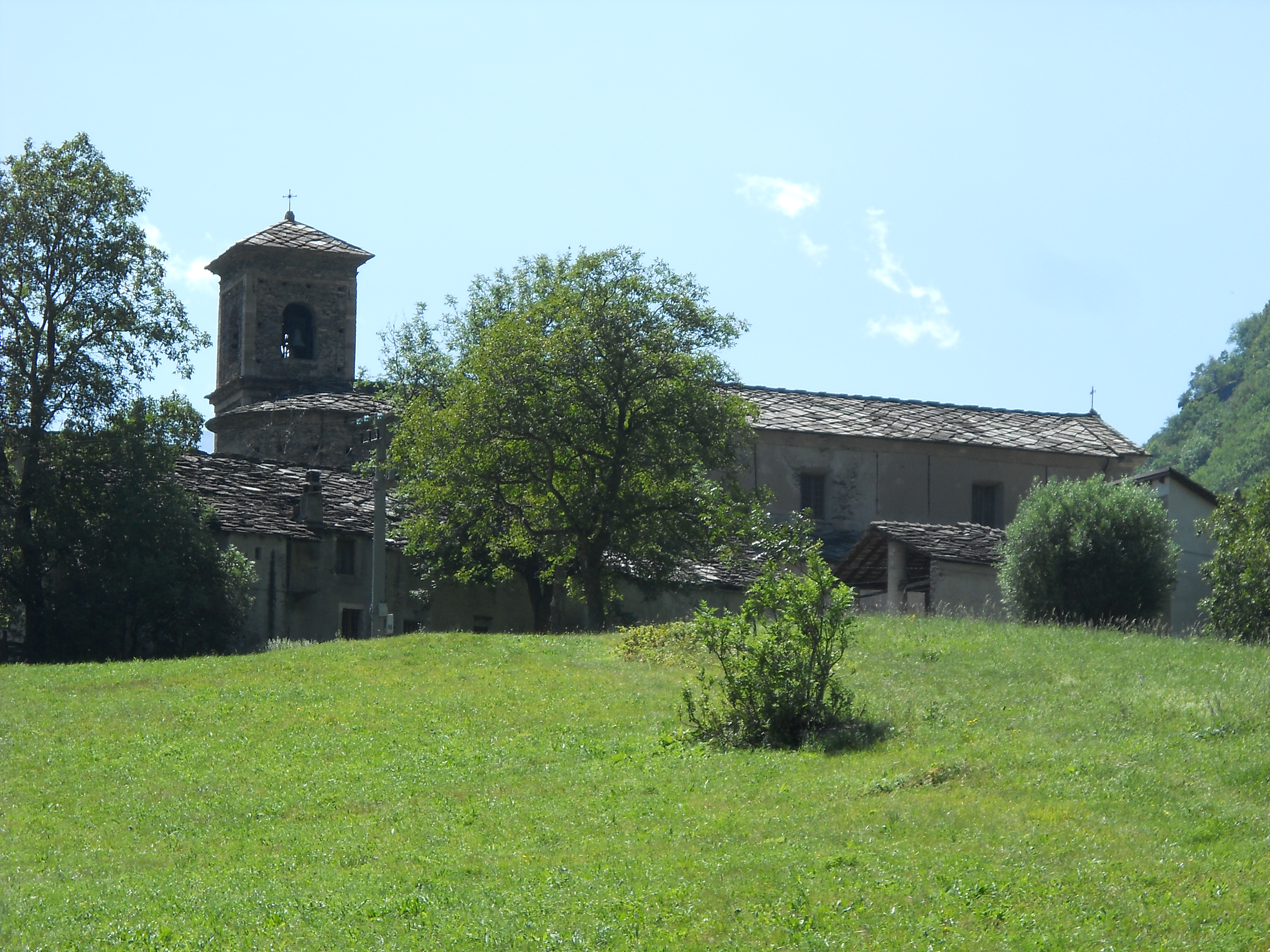
Novalesa Abbey in Piedmont (Italy)

Year 726 (DCCXXVI) was a common year starting on Tuesday of the Julian calendar, the 726th year of the Common Era (CE) and Anno Domini (AD) designations, the 726th year of the 1st millennium, the 26th year of the 8th century, and the 7th year of the 720s decade. The denomination 726 for this year has been used since the early medieval period, when the Anno Domini calendar era became the prevalent method in Europe for naming years.

== Events ==
=== By place ===
==== Byzantine Empire ====
- Emperor Leo III issues a series of edicts banning the veneration of images (726–729), and launching the iconoclastic controversies. Most of the clergy – particularly in Italy and Greece – are opposed to these edicts with uncompromising hostility, and in the western parts of the Byzantine Empire the people refuse to obey his religious reforms.
- Arab–Byzantine War: Muslim forces under Maslama ibn Abd al-Malik resume their expedition against Anatolia (modern Turkey). In a large-scale raid they plunder the fortress city of Caesarea.

==== Europe ====
- Umayyad conquest of Gaul: Muslim raiders under Abdul Rahman al-Ghafiqi, current governor of Septimania, devastate Avignon, Viviers, Valence, Vienne and Lyon (approximate date).
- Marcello Tegalliano, second Doge of Venice, dies after a 9-year reign.
- Uprising in Venice against Byzantium: The cause of mass unrest is the iconoclastic decrees of Emperor Leo III. A few days later, political demands are put forward for wide autonomy within the Byzantine Empire and the right to appoint the ruler of the region (Doge). The rebels elect Orso Ipato the Doge of Venice. Desiring to preserve the proceeds of the treasury from the second most important port of the Byzantine Empire, and not having the resources to cope with a well-fortified and armed region, Byzantium agrees with all the requirements put forward. Orso Ipato is recognised by Leo III, who gives him the title hypatos. The Venetian fleet, led by Orso Ipato, frees Ravenna from the Lombards and restores the power of the Byzantine governor there.
- Seismic activity in the Mediterranean Sea: The volcanic island of Thera erupts, while the city of Jerash (in present-day Jordan) suffers a major earthquake.

==== Britain ====
- King Ine of Wessex resigns his crown, and travels on a pilgrimage to Rome. He is succeeded by his brother-in-law (and probably distant cousin) Æthelheard.
- Dúngal mac Selbaig is deposed as king of Dál Riata (Scotland). He is succeeded by Eochaid mac Echdach (a son of former king Eochaid mac Domangairt).

==== Asia ====
- The first annual Sumo tournament in Japan is held by Emperor Shōmu (approximate date).

==== Central America ====
- October 22 – Itzamnaaj K'awiil, the ruler of the Mayan city state at Dos Pilas in Guatemala since 698, dies after a 28-year reign.

=== By topic ===
==== Religion ====
- Abbo of Provence, Frankish nobleman, founds Novalesa Abbey in Piedmont (Northern Italy).
- Benedictine abbey of Neuwiller founded by bishop Sigibald of Metz.
- Council of Manzikert in Armenian and West Syriac churches

== Births ==
- Grifo, Frankish duke and son of Charles Martel (d. 753)
- Paulinus II, patriarch of Aquileia (approximate date)

== Deaths ==
- October 22 – Itzamnaaj K'awiil, a Maya ruler of Dos Pilas
- Anbasa ibn Suhaym al-Kalbi, Muslim governor
- Marcello Tegalliano, doge of Venice
- Oda of Scotland, Christian saint (approximate date)
- Smbat VI, Armenian prince
- Tobias, bishop of Rochester
