= Bruidge mac Nath Í =

King of the Uí Failge, Ireland

Bruidge mac Nath Í (died 579) was a king of the Uí Failge, a Laigin people of County Offaly. He was the grandson of Failge Berraide, the eponymous ancestor of the dynasty.

He is listed as king in the Book of Leinster king list though incorrectly as Bruidgi mac Cathair. He is also mentioned in a poem in the genealogies about the royal fort at Rathangan, County Kildare. The annals record his death in the year 579 and this may have been in warfare with the Ui Neill

== See also ==
- Kings of Ui Failghe
