= 811 =

Calendar year

811 in various calendars
- Gregorian calendar: 811; DCCCXI
- Ab urbe condita: 1564
- Armenian calendar: 260; ԹՎ ՄԿ
- Assyrian calendar: 5561
- Balinese saka calendar: 732–733
- Bengali calendar: 217–218
- Berber calendar: 1761
- Buddhist calendar: 1355
- Burmese calendar: 173
- Byzantine calendar: 6319–6320
- Chinese calendar: 庚寅年 (Metal Tiger); 3508 or 3301 — to — 辛卯年 (Metal Rabbit); 3509 or 3302
- Coptic calendar: 527–528
- Discordian calendar: 1977
- Ethiopian calendar: 803–804
- Hebrew calendar: 4571–4572
- Hindu calendars
- Vikram Samvat: 867–868
- Shaka Samvat: 732–733
- Kali Yuga: 3911–3912
- Holocene calendar: 10811
- Iranian calendar: 189–190
- Islamic calendar: 195–196
- Japanese calendar: Kōnin 2 (弘仁２年)
- Javanese calendar: 707–708
- Julian calendar: 811; DCCCXI
- Korean calendar: 3144
- Minguo calendar: 1101 before ROC 民前1101年
- Nanakshahi calendar: −657
- Seleucid era: 1122/1123 AG
- Thai solar calendar: 1353–1354
- Tibetan calendar: ལྕགས་ཕོ་སྟག་ལོ་ (male Iron-Tiger); 937 or 556 or −216 — to — ལྕགས་མོ་ཡོས་ལོ་ (female Iron-Hare); 938 or 557 or −215

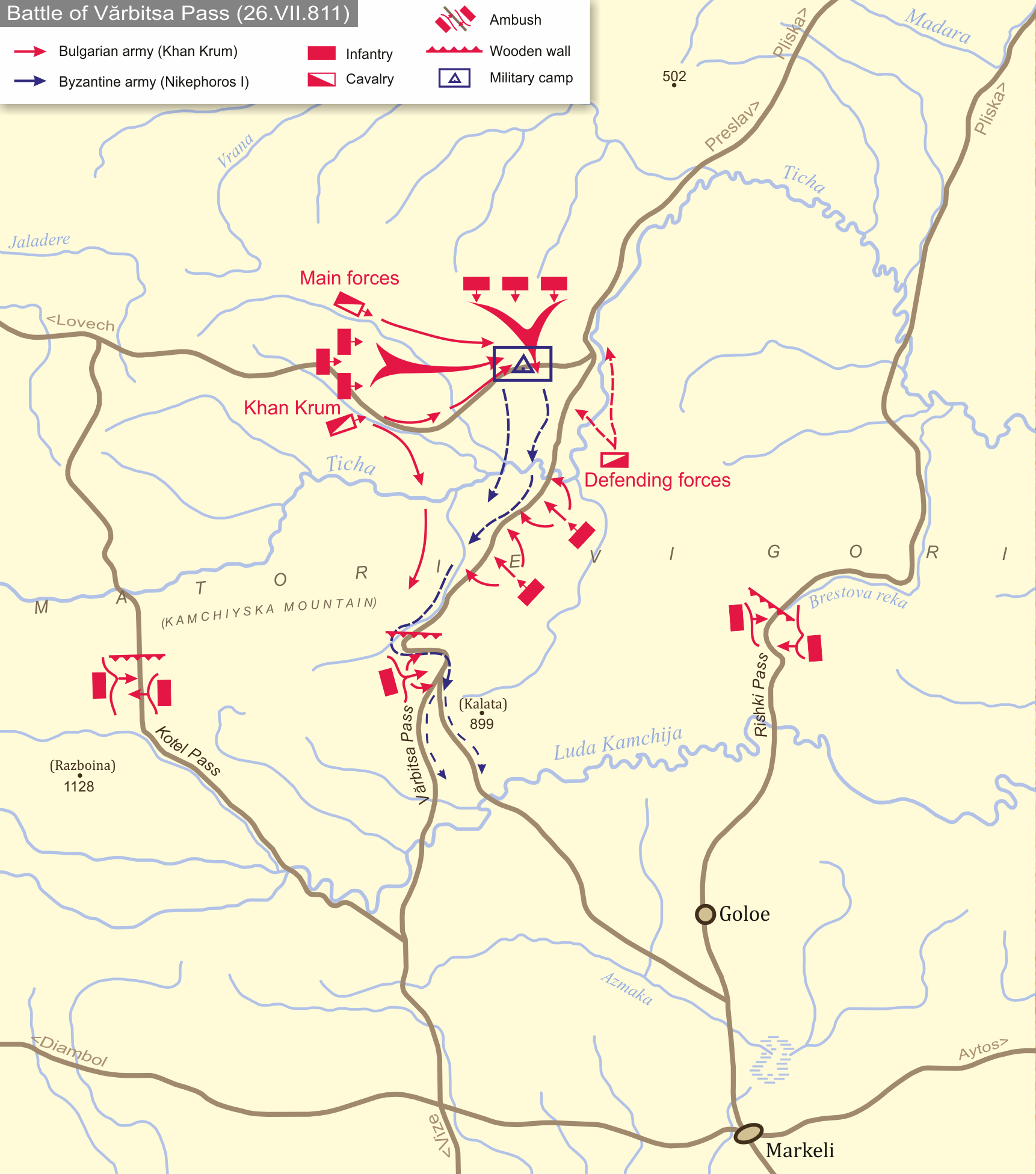
Battle of Vărbitsa Pass near Pliska (811)

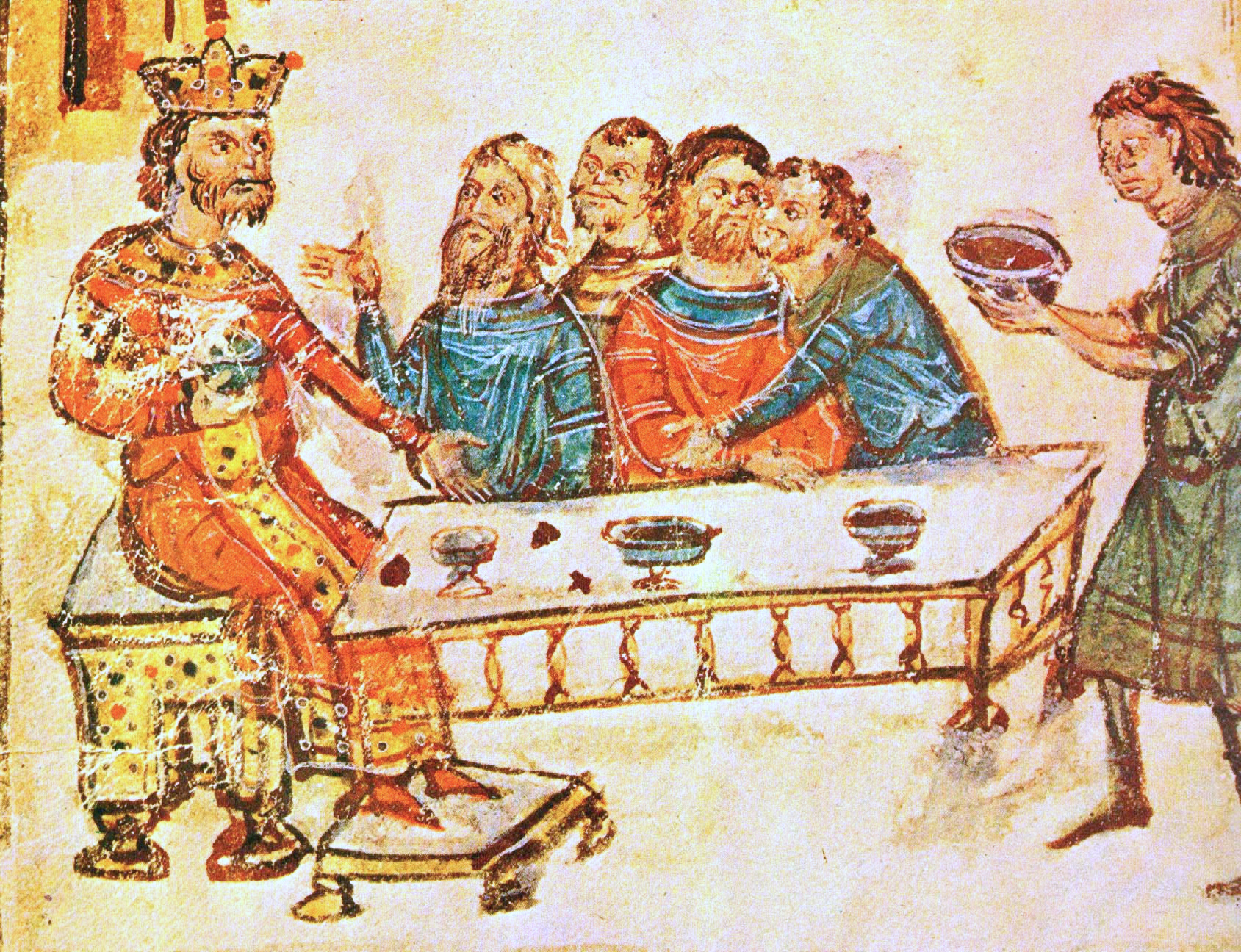
Krum feasts his victory over Nikephoros I

Year 811 (DCCCXI) was a common year starting on Wednesday of the Julian calendar, the 811th year of the Common Era (CE) and Anno Domini (AD) designations, the 811th year of the 1st millennium, the 11th year of the 9th century, and the 2nd year of the 810s decade.

== Events ==
=== By place ===
==== Byzantine Empire ====
- Byzantine–Bulgarian War: Emperor Nikephoros I organises a new campaign against the Bulgarian Empire, gathering an expeditionary force (most of the Roman army) from all parts of the empire. He is accompanied by high-ranking officials and aristocrats, including his son Stauracius and brother-in-law Michael I Rangabe (both later emperors temporarily). Krum, ruler (khan) of Bulgaria, sends envoys to sue for peace. Nikephoros refuses to accept the terms and marches through the Balkan passes towards Pliska, the Bulgarian capital.
- July 23 – Nikephoros I reaches Pliska, and destroys a Bulgarian army of 12,000 elite soldiers who guard the stronghold. Another hastily assembled relief force of 50,000 soldiers suffers a similar fate. The Byzantines capture the defenseless capital. Nikephoros plunders the city and captures Krum's treasury. He burns the countryside, slaughters sheep and pigs, as he pursues the retreating Bulgars southwest towards Serdica (modern-day Sofia).
- July 26 – Battle of Vărbitsa Pass: Nikephoros I is trapped (probably in the Vărbitsa Pass) and defeated by the Bulgars, who use the tactics of ambush and surprise night attacks to immobilize the Byzantine forces. Nikephoros himself is killed; Krum has the emperor's head carried back in triumph on a pole, where it is cleaned out, lined with silver and made into a jeweled skull cup, which he allows his Slavic princes (archons) to drink from with him.
- Stauracius is installed as emperor at Adrianople (the first time a Byzantine emperor is crowned outside Constantinople). Because of a sword wound near his neck (during the Battle of Pliska), Stauracius is paralyzed. The imperial court is split between the noble factions of his wife Theophano and his sister Prokopia.
- October 2 – Michael I is declared emperor of the Byzantine Empire; Stauracius is forced by senior officials to retire to a monastery.

==== Europe ====
- Treaty of Heiligen: King Hemming of Denmark concludes a peace treaty with Emperor Charlemagne in present-day Rendsburg. The southern boundary of Denmark is established at the Eider River.

==== Abbasid Caliphate ====
- Fourth Fitna: Abbasid caliph al-Amin appoints Ali ibn Isa ibn Mahan as governor of Khurasan, in northeast Persia, and sends an army of 40,000 men with him against his half-brother al-Ma'mun. Ibn Mahan's army is defeated by a smaller army under Tahir ibn Husayn, at Rayy. During the fighting Ali ibn Isa ibn Mahan is killed.

== Births ==
- Abu Hatim al-Razi, Muslim hadith scholar (d. 890)
- Basil I, emperor of the Byzantine Empire (d. 886)
- Muhammad al-Jawad, ninth Twelver Shī'ah Imām (d. 835)
- Ōe no Otondo, Japanese scholar (d. 877)

== Deaths ==
- June 17 – Sakanoue no Tamuramaro, Japanese shōgun (b. 758)
- July 24 – Gao Ying, chancellor of the Tang Dynasty (b. 740)
- July 26 – Nikephoros I, emperor of the Byzantine Empire
- Ali ibn Isa ibn Mahan, Muslim military leader
- Charles the Younger, son of Charlemagne
- Li Fan, chancellor of the Tang Dynasty (b. 754)
- Pei Ji, chancellor of the Tang Dynasty
- Pepin the Hunchback, son of Charlemagne
