= Cináed mac Flainn =

Cináed mac Flainn (died 770) was the king of the Uí Failge, a Laigin people of County Offaly. He was one of the many sons of Fland Dá Chongal, a previous king. He ruled from 757 to 770. He was the second of Fland's sons by Érenach, daughter of Murchad Midi (died 715) of Uisnech to hold the throne.

In 770 he challenged the authority of the over king of Leinster, Cellach mac Dúnchada (died 776). This coincided with attacks launched by the southern Ui Neill including the high king Donnchad Midi (died 797). Cináed was defeated and slain at the Battle of Áth Orc (in County Offaly) along with his brother Cellach and his ally Cathnia mac Bécce of the Fothairt.

His son Flaíthnia mac Cináeda (died 806) was a King of Uí Failge.

== See also ==
- Kings of Ui Failghe
