= 698 =

Calendar year

698 in various calendars
Gregorian calendar	698; DCXCVIII
Ab urbe condita	1451
Armenian calendar	147; ԹՎ ՃԽԷ
Assyrian calendar	5448
Balinese saka calendar	619–620
Bengali calendar	104–105
Berber calendar	1648
Buddhist calendar	1242
Burmese calendar	60
Byzantine calendar	6206–6207
Chinese calendar	丁酉年 (Fire Rooster); 3395 or 3188 — to — 戊戌年 (Earth Dog); 3396 or 3189
Coptic calendar	414–415
Discordian calendar	1864
Ethiopian calendar	690–691
Hebrew calendar	4458–4459
- Hindu calendars
Vikram Samvat	754–755
Shaka Samvat	619–620
Kali Yuga	3798–3799
Holocene calendar	10698
Iranian calendar	76–77
Islamic calendar	78–79
Japanese calendar	Shuchō 13 (朱鳥１３年)
Javanese calendar	590–591
Julian calendar	698; DCXCVIII
Korean calendar	3031
Minguo calendar	1214 before ROC 民前1214年
Nanakshahi calendar	−770
Seleucid era	1009/1010 AG
Thai solar calendar	1240–1241
Tibetan calendar	མེ་མོ་བྱ་ལོ་ (female Fire-Bird); 824 or 443 or −329 — to — ས་ཕོ་ཁྱི་ལོ་ (male Earth-Dog); 825 or 444 or −328

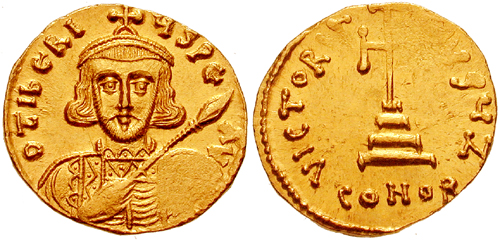
Emperor Tiberios III (698–705)

Year 698 (DCXCVIII) was a common year starting on Tuesday of the Julian calendar. The denomination 698 for this year has been used since the early medieval period, when the Anno Domini calendar era became the prevalent method in Europe for naming years.

== Events ==
=== By place ===
==== Byzantine Empire ====
- Spring–summer – Arab forces under Hasan ibn al-Nu'man capture Carthage, ending Byzantine rule in North Africa. The defeated Byzantine fleet revolts and proclaims Tiberios III, who deposes Leontios after a brief siege of Constantinople, Byzantine Emperor.
- Autumn–winter – The Byzantine general Heraclius, brother of Tiberios III, crosses the mountain passes of the Taurus Mountains into Cilicia with an army. He launches a campaign in Syria, defeats an Arab force from Antioch, and raids as far as Samosata (modern Turkey).
- Outbreak of bubonic plague in Constantinople, Syria and Mesopotamia: Theophanes the Confessor reports that the plague lasted four months and describes a large number of deaths in Constantinople. Emperor Leontios orders the destruction of a market in the Neorion cargo port of Constantinople, where animals are sold and which is considered to be the source of infected animals brought from Syria. The Arab army is forced to suspend its military operations. According to Syrian sources, the plague in Syria lasted another two years.

==== Europe ====
- Wittiza, son of King Ergica, becomes co-ruler of the Visigoth Kingdom in Hispania (approximate date).

==== Britain ====
- Berhtred, Anglo-Saxon nobleman, is killed leading a Northumbrian army against the Picts. The kingdom of Cait (or Cat) in northern Scotland is absorbed (approximate date).
- Fiannamail ua Dúnchado becomes king of Dál Riata (Scotland), until his death around 700 (approximate date).

==== Arabian Empire ====
- Berber forces led by Queen Kahina ("The Diviner") are crushed by Arab invaders at Aures (Algeria). She has rallied the Berbers since the collapse of Byzantine power (see 647).

==== Asia ====
- Dae Jo-young establishes the kingdom of Balhae in Manchuria (approximate date).
- Khun Lo, a Thai prince, conquers Muang Sua, an early Laotian kingdom.
- Qapaghan Qaghan conquers parts of Transoxiana (Central Asia).
- The festival of first-fruits (Daijo-sai) is held in Japan.

==== Central America ====
- March 24 – Itzamnaaj K'awiil becomes the new ruler of the Mayan city state at Dos Pilas in Guatemala and reigns until 726.

=== By topic ===
==== Religion ====
- Council of Aquileia: The bishops of the diocese of Aquileia decide to end the Schism of the Three Chapters and return to communion with Rome.
- Willibrord, Anglo-Saxon missionary, establishes an abbey at Echternach (Luxembourg), presented to him by Irmina, daughter of King Dagobert II.
- Probable date of Cuthbert's burial behind the altar at Lindisfarne (approximate date).
- Princess Taki is sent to Saikū, as a Saiō of the Ise Shrine (Japan).

== Births ==
- Shang, emperor of the Tang dynasty (or 695)
- Wang Changling, Chinese poet and official (d. 756)

== Deaths ==
- May 6 – Eadberht, bishop of Lindisfarne
- July 22 – Wu Chengsi, nephew of Chinese sovereign Wu Zetian
- Ainbcellach mac Ferchair, king of Dál Riata (Scotland)
- Berthtred, Anglo-Saxon noblemen (approximate date)
- Rieul, bishop of Reims (approximate date)
- Suraqah al-Bariqi, Arab poet (b. 621)
- Trudo, Frankish abbot (approximate date)
