= 758 =

Calendar year

758 in various calendars
- Gregorian calendar: 758; DCCLVIII
- Ab urbe condita: 1511
- Armenian calendar: 207; ԹՎ ՄԷ
- Assyrian calendar: 5508
- Balinese saka calendar: 679–680
- Bengali calendar: 164–165
- Berber calendar: 1708
- Buddhist calendar: 1302
- Burmese calendar: 120
- Byzantine calendar: 6266–6267
- Chinese calendar: 丁酉年 (Fire Rooster); 3455 or 3248 — to — 戊戌年 (Earth Dog); 3456 or 3249
- Coptic calendar: 474–475
- Discordian calendar: 1924
- Ethiopian calendar: 750–751
- Hebrew calendar: 4518–4519
- Hindu calendars
- Vikram Samvat: 814–815
- Shaka Samvat: 679–680
- Kali Yuga: 3858–3859
- Holocene calendar: 10758
- Iranian calendar: 136–137
- Islamic calendar: 140–141
- Japanese calendar: Tenpyō-hōji 2 (天平宝字２年)
- Javanese calendar: 652–653
- Julian calendar: 758; DCCLVIII
- Korean calendar: 3091
- Minguo calendar: 1154 before ROC 民前1154年
- Nanakshahi calendar: −710
- Seleucid era: 1069/1070 AG
- Thai solar calendar: 1300–1301
- Tibetan calendar: མེ་མོ་བྱ་ལོ་ (female Fire-Bird); 884 or 503 or −269 — to — ས་ཕོ་ཁྱི་ལོ་ (male Earth-Dog); 885 or 504 or −268

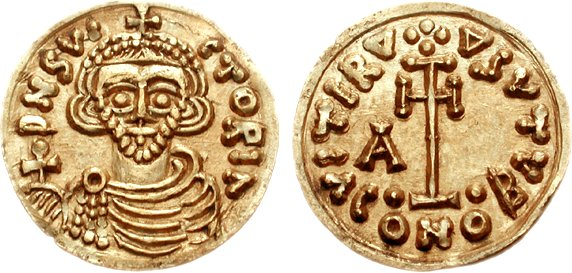
A tremissis of duke Arechis II of Benevento

Year 758 (DCCLVIII) was a common year starting on Sunday of the Julian calendar. The denomination 758 for this year has been used since the early medieval period, when the Anno Domini calendar era became the prevalent method in Europe for naming years.

== Events ==
=== By place ===
==== Europe ====
- Summer – Duke Liutprand of Benevento attains majority, and rebels against Lombard rule. King Desiderius defeats him, and grants his duchy to Arechis II (son of Liutprand). He marries Adelperga, daughter of Desiderius, and establishes friendly (but largely independent) relations with the Lombard Kingdom.
- Desiderius deposes Alboin, duke of Spoleto (Central Italy), and exercises ducal authority himself, tying the duchy more closely to the Lombard capital of Pavia.

==== Britain ====
- King Beorna of East Anglia dies. Prince Æthelred, descendant of the late king Rædwald, apparently succeeds as king (approximate date).
- King Eadberht of Northumbria abdicates the throne in favour of his son, Oswulf. He enters the monastery attached to the cathedral of York.
- King Swithred of Essex dies after a 12-year reign. He is succeeded by Sigeric, son of the late king Saelred (see 709).
- King Cynewulf of Wessex retakes Berkshire from the Mercians, and begins a war with the Welsh (approximate date).

==== Africa ====
- A group of four Basra-educated missionaries, including 'Abd al-Rahman Iban Rustam, proclaim the Ibadi imamate. Followers conquer the city of Kairouan (modern Tunisia), and massacre the Kharijites.

==== Asia ====
- An Lushan Rebellion: The Chinese seaport of Guangzhou is sacked by Muslim and Persian raiders. The port is shut down for the next 5 decades, while foreign vessels dock at Hanoi (modern Vietnam) instead. Guangzhou thrives again, once it is reopened to foreign trade in the early 9th century.
- June – Abbasid Arabs and Uyghur Turks arrive simultaneously at the Tang capital of Chang'an, in order to offer tribute to the imperial court. The Arabs and Turks bicker and fight over diplomatic prominence at the gate, to present tribute before the other. A settlement is reached when both are allowed to enter at the same time, but through different gates to the palace.
- Empress Kōken abdicates the throne, after a 9-year reign. She is succeeded by her adopted son Junnin, grandson of the late emperor Tenmu. He becomes the 47th emperor (tennō) of Japan.

== Births ==
- Adrian, Count of Orléans, brother in law of Charlemagne and uncle of Louis the Pious (d. c. 821)
- Hyegong, king of Silla (Korea) (d. 780)
- Li Fengji, chancellor of the Tang Dynasty (d. 835)
- Li Jifu, chancellor of the Tang Dynasty (d. 814)
- Nikephoros, son of Constantine V (or 756)
- Nikephoros I, patriarch of Constantinople (approximate date)
- Sakanoue no Tamuramaro, Japanese shōgun (d. 811)
- Sico of Benevento, Lombard prince (approximate date)
- Theophanes the Confessor, Byzantine monk (or 760)
- Wang Zhixing, general of the Tang Dynasty (d. 836)
- Wu Yuanheng, chancellor of the Tang Dynasty (d. 815)

== Deaths ==
- Beorna, king of East Anglia (approximate date)
- Chen Xilie, chancellor of the Tang Dynasty
- Swithred, king of Essex
