= Ólchobar mac Flainn =

Ólchobar mac Flainn (died 796) was a supposed King of Munster from the Uí Fidgenti of County Limerick, allies and/or distant cousins of the Eóganachta. He was the first non-Eóganachta to be considered king (for several centuries) in some sources. He belonged to a branch of the Uí Fidgenti known as the Uí Conaill Gabra, ancestors of the later famous septs of O'Connell of Kerry and Ó Coileáin of Carbery. His father Flann mac Erca (died 762) and brother Scandlán mac Flainn (died 786) were kings of the Uí Fidgenti.

It is more likely that he has been confused with Ólchobar mac Duib-Indrecht (died 805) in some sources. Only the Annals of Ulster call him King of Munster at his death obit in 796. The consideration that a non-Eóganachta could have held the throne is a symptom of the decline of the inner circle of the Eóganachta in the later 8th century after the death of Cathal mac Finguine (died 742). The Annals of Innisfallen do not call him King of Munster at his death obit but do refer to his holding the lay-abbacy of Inis Cathaig or Scattery Island.

He was succeeded as King of Uí Fidgenti by his brother Murchad (died 807).

The Uí Fidgenti had their own large capital at Dún Eochair, established several centuries before the rise of the Eóganachta by the Dáirine, once the great power of Munster. An account is given by Geoffrey Keating. The Uí Fidgenti have been accused of being Dáirine themselves or at least a mixture of Dáirine and Eóganachta, and so if true then it would have been highly unusual for a member to occupy the still new capital of Cashel. Theoretically only the descendants of Conall Corc could enjoy the Cashel kingship, and whether cousins of the Eóganachta or not the Uí Fidgenti, and the related Uí Liatháin, were certainly not his descendants. If the most ancient genealogies are correct, e.g. Rawlinson B 502, they descended from an uncle of Conall Corc known as Dáire Cerbba.

Thus it is very unlikely that Ólchobar mac Flainn would have been able to rule at least from Cashel with much authority.
