= 815 =

Calendar year

815 in various calendars
- Gregorian calendar: 815; DCCCXV
- Ab urbe condita: 1568
- Armenian calendar: 264; ԹՎ ՄԿԴ
- Assyrian calendar: 5565
- Balinese saka calendar: 736–737
- Bengali calendar: 221–222
- Berber calendar: 1765
- Buddhist calendar: 1359
- Burmese calendar: 177
- Byzantine calendar: 6323–6324
- Chinese calendar: 甲午年 (Wood Horse); 3512 or 3305 — to — 乙未年 (Wood Goat); 3513 or 3306
- Coptic calendar: 531–532
- Discordian calendar: 1981
- Ethiopian calendar: 807–808
- Hebrew calendar: 4575–4576
- Hindu calendars
- Vikram Samvat: 871–872
- Shaka Samvat: 736–737
- Kali Yuga: 3915–3916
- Holocene calendar: 10815
- Iranian calendar: 193–194
- Islamic calendar: 199–200
- Japanese calendar: Kōnin 6 (弘仁６年)
- Javanese calendar: 711–712
- Julian calendar: 815; DCCCXV
- Korean calendar: 3148
- Minguo calendar: 1097 before ROC 民前1097年
- Nanakshahi calendar: −653
- Seleucid era: 1126/1127 AG
- Thai solar calendar: 1357–1358
- Tibetan calendar: ཤིང་ཕོ་རྟ་ལོ་ (male Wood-Horse); 941 or 560 or −212 — to — ཤིང་མོ་ལུག་ལོ་ (female Wood-Sheep); 942 or 561 or −211

Map indicating travels of first Scandinavians

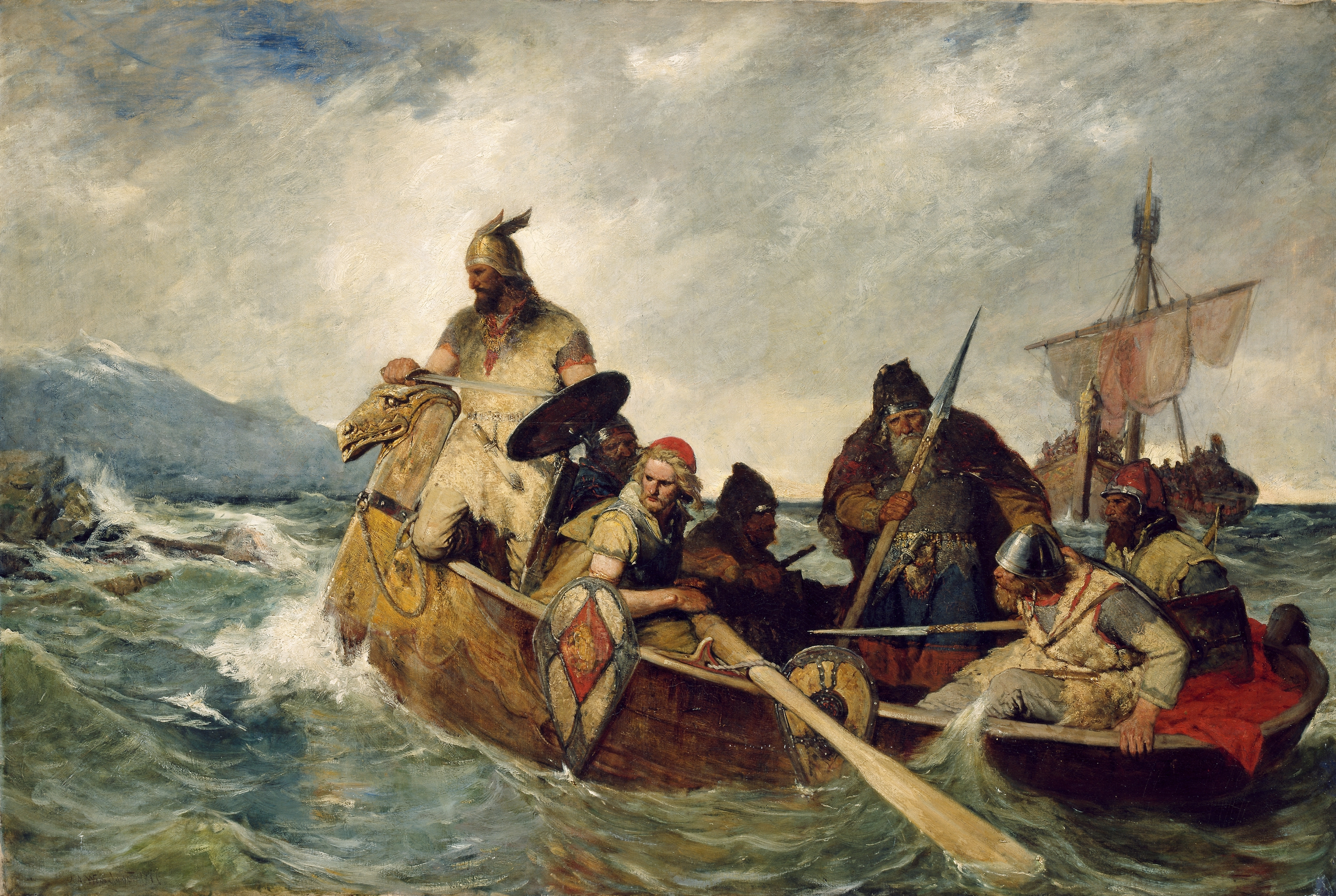
Norsemen landing in Iceland (9th century)

Year 815 (DCCCXV) was a common year starting on Monday of the Julian calendar, the 815th year of the Common Era (CE) and Anno Domini (AD) designations, the 815th year of the 1st millennium, the 15th year of the 9th century, and the 6th year of the 810s decade.

== Events ==
=== By place ===
==== Byzantine Empire ====
- Byzantine–Bulgarian Treaty: Emperor Leo V the Armenian signs a 30-year peace agreement in Constantinople with Omurtag, ruler (khan) of the Bulgarian Empire. The Rhodope Mountains become the Byzantine border again, and Leo regains its lost Black Sea cities, after the Bulgars have them demolished.

==== Central America ====
- April 2 – Sihyaj K'in Ich’aak II becomes the new ruler of the Mayan city state of Machaquila in Guatemala after the death of Ochk'in Kaloomte' Aj Ho' Baak, and reigns until early 824.

==== Europe ====
- Hrafna-Flóki Vilgerðarson sets out from the Faroe Islands and discovers Iceland (documented later in the Landnámabók) (approximate date).

==== Britain ====
- King Egbert of Wessex ravages the territories of the remaining British kingdom Dumnonia, known as the West Welsh (Cornwall).

==== Asia ====
- Emperor Saga of Japan is the first sovereign to drink tea (according to legend), imported from China by monks. The upper classes adopt this beverage for medicinal use.
- July 13 – Wu Yuanheng, Chinese chancellor of the Tang Dynasty, is murdered by assassins of warlord Wu Yuanji, in Chang'an.

=== By topic ===
==== Religion ====
- Synod of Constantinople: A council led by patriarch Theodotus I, in the Hagia Sophia, reinstitutes iconoclasm.

== Births ==
- Abu Hanifa Dinawari, Muslim botanist and geographer (d. 896)
- Boniface VI, pope of the Catholic Church (d. 896)
- Dawud al-Zahiri, Muslim scholar (approximate date)
- Eberhard, duke of Friuli (approximate date)
- Johannes Scotus Eriugena, Irish theologian (approximate date)
- Leoluca, Sicilian abbot (approximate date)
- Methodius, Byzantine missionary and bishop (d. 885)
- Theodora, Byzantine empress (approximate date)

== Deaths ==
- February 15 – Ibn Tabataba, Zaydi anti-caliph
- July 13 – Wu Yuanheng, chancellor of the Tang Dynasty (b. 758)
- October 18 – Abu'l-Saraya, Zaydi rebel leader
- Jābir ibn Hayyān (Geber), Muslim alchemist (approximate date)
- Laylā bint Ṭarīf, Arab woman warrior poet
- Mashallah ibn Athari, Jewish-Arab astrologer
- Muirgius mac Tommaltaig, king of Connacht (Ireland)
- Omar Tiberiades, Persian astrologer (approximate date)
- Sadnalegs, emperor of Tibet (approximate date)
