= Hieria =

Ancient town and suburb of Constantinople; now Fenerbahçe, Istanbul, Turkey

Coordinates: 40°58′10″N 29°02′02″E

Hieria (in Greek variously Ἱερεῖα, Ἱερία, Ἡρία), also known as Heraeum or Heraion (Ἡραῖον), modern Fenerbahçe, was a town of ancient Bithynia and a suburb of Byzantine-era Constantinople (modern Istanbul, Turkey). It is prominent in the city's history as the site of an imperial palace.

The name derives from Heraion akron (Greek: Ἡραῖον ἄκρον, "Cape of Hera"), which was given in antiquity to a small promontory (modern Fener burnu) on the Asian shore of the Bosporus, opposite Chalcedon (modern Kadıköy). The Emperor Justinian I (r. 527–565) built a palace here, which included a harbour and a church dedicated to St. Mary. The palace, which survived at least until 1203, served as a summer residence for a number of Byzantine emperors, including Emperor Heraclius (r. 610–641) and Emperor Basil I (r. 867–886), who added a chapel dedicated to the Prophet Elijah. Due to its location on the Asian side of the Bosporus, the palace often served as a reception point for triumphal returns of the Byzantine emperors from campaigns in the East. The iconoclastic "Council of Hieria" took place in the palace in 754. Only a few traces of the original palace complex (the harbour breakwater, a cistern and funerary inscriptions) survive.

Its site is located at Fenerbahçe in Asiatic Turkey.

== Sources ==
- Kazhdan, Alexander Petrovich, ed. (1991). Oxford Dictionary of Byzantium. New York, New York and Oxford, United Kingdom: Oxford University Press. ISBN 978-0-19-504652-6.
