= Mugrón mac Flainn =

Mugrón mac Flainn (died 782) was a king of the Uí Failge, a Laigin people of County Offaly. He was one of the many sons of Fland Dá Chongal, a previous king. He ruled from 770 to 782. He was the third of Fland's sons by Érenach, daughter of Murchad Midi (died 715) of Uisnech, to hold the throne.

Mugrón aligned with Bran Ardchenn mac Muiredaig (died 795), claimant to the Leinster throne (who was also allied to the high king Donnchad Midi) versus the incumbent king Ruaidrí mac Fáeláin (died 785). They were however defeated at the Battle of Curragh (near Kildare) and Mugrón was slain.

His sons Óengus mac Mugróin (died 803) and Cináed mac Mugróin (died 829) were Kings of the Uí Failge. Another son Colcu was ancestor Clann Colgcan in northern Offaly (centered in the barony of Lower Philipstown).

== See also ==
- Kings of Ui Failghe
