= Ailill Corrach mac Flainn =

King of the Uí Failge of County Offaly, Ireland

Ailill Corrach mac Flainn (died 741) was a king of the Uí Failge, a Laigin people of County Offaly. He was one of the many sons of Fland Dá Chongal, a previous king. He ruled from 714 to 741. The byname Corrach means unsteady.

Four of his brothers were slain at the Battle of Áth Senaig in 738 when the men of Leinster were crushed by the high king Áed Allán. Ailill was killed in 741 but the circumstances are not given.

== See also ==
- Kings of Ui Failghe
