= Cummascach mac Flainn =

Cummascach mac Flainn (died 757) was a king of the Uí Failge, a Laigin people of County Offaly. He was one of the many sons of Fland Dá Chongal, a previous king. He ruled from 755 to 757. He was the first of Fland's sons by Érenach, daughter of Murchad Midi (died 715) of Uisnech to hold the throne.

Not mentioned in the Annals of Ulster, the Annals of Tigernach record that he was slain in 757 by Máel Dúin mac Áedo (died 786), King of Munster.

== See also ==
- Kings of Ui Failghe
