= Eoban =

German bishop and martyr

- Bishop of Utrecht
- Church: Catholic Church
- Diocese: Archdiocese of Utrecht
- In office: 753–754

Personal details
- Died: 5 June 754

Eoban (died 5 June 754 at Dokkum) was a companion of St. Boniface, and was martyred with him on his final mission. In Germany, he is revered as a bishop and martyr.

== Biography ==
Little is known of Eoban apart from what the Vita Bonifatii says. Apparently, he was an English priest who came to Germany together with St. Boniface. In 753, Willibald's Vita lists him as a Chorbishop. The Fulda martyrology mentions him as a bishop, as does the Vita tertia Bonifatii.

According to the Vita Bonifatii auctore Willibaldo, on the morning of 5 June 754, Boniface and 50 others, presumably including Eoban (none of the companions are mentioned by name in the Vita), were killed at Dokkum (The Netherlands) by pagan Frisians. His cult was of some importance to English Catholics; he is included in the paintings made by Niccolò Circignani of English saints and martyrs in the English College, Rome.

== Veneration in Erfurt ==
After 756 the relics of the bishops of Utrecht Eoban and Adalar were transferred to Fulda, and buried next to St. Boniface. Before 1100 they had been then transferred to Erfurt. Around this time the veneration of the companions of St. Boniface began in Erfurt.

The Sarcophagus containing the relics of the saints Adalar and Eoban in the Erfurt Cathedral is dated from about 1350.

His feast day as a saint is June 5th.

== Sources ==
- Dehio Mitteldeutschland, 1943, S. 94
- Schubert, Ernst, Der Dom zu Erfurt, Berlin 1992, Abb. 106
- Wäß, Helga: Reliquiensarkophag für den heiligen Bischof Adolar und seinen heiligen Diakon Eoban, in: Form und Wahrnehmung mitteldeutscher Gedächtnisskulptur im 14. Jahrhundert, hier Bd. 2, Katalog ausgewählter Objekte vom Hohen Mittelalter bis zum Anfang des 15. Jahrhunderts, Bristol, Berlin 2006, S. 156 ff. with illustrations. - ISBN 3-86504-159-0
- Transkription des Prozessionsprotokolls für den Umgang mit den Reliquien der hll. Adolar und Eoban, in: Helga Wäß: Prozessionsordnung von 1452, in: Form und Wahrnehmung mitteldeutscher Gedächtnisskulptur im 14. Jahrhundert, Bd. 1, Bristol and Berlin 2006, S. 486 ff. - ISBN 3-86504-159-0

Preceded by Wera	Bishop of Utrecht; 754	Succeeded by Gregory of Utrecht
