= Battle of Alameda =

Battle near Córdoba, Spain

- Part of Establishment of the Emirate of Córdoba
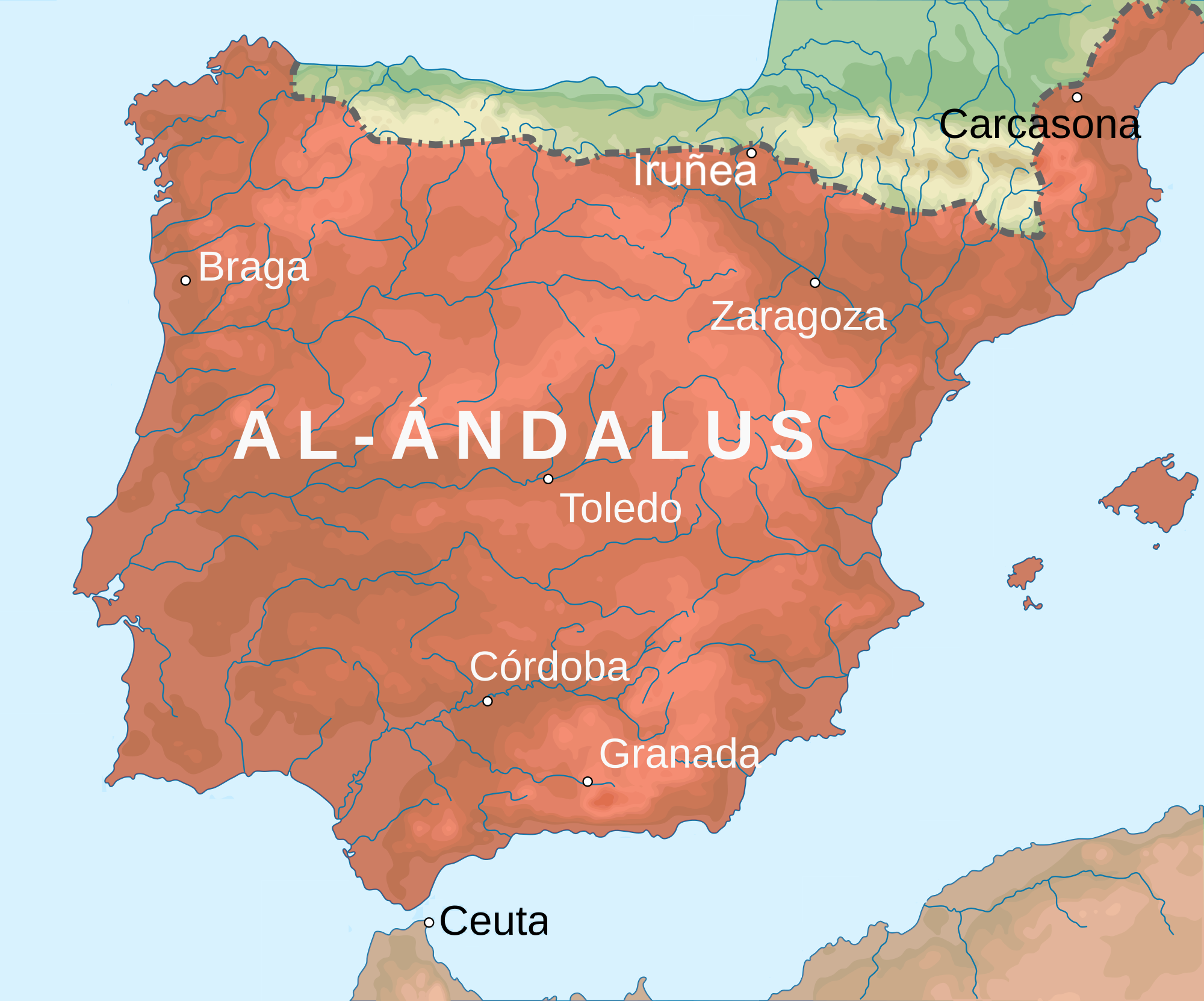
- Al-Andalus in 750 AD
Date	14–15 May 756
Location	Alameda (near Córdoba), al-Andalus
Result	Umayyad victory

Belligerents
Umayyad dynasty	Fihrid dynasty

Commanders and leaders
Abd al-Rahman I Habib ibn Abd al-Malik; Abd al-Malik ibn Umar; Ibrahim ibn Khashrah; Buhlul al-Lakhmi; Asim al-Uryani	Yusuf ibn Abd al-Rahma al-Sumayl ibn Hatim

Strength
≈2,000 cavalry, ≈3,000 infantry	Unknown

Casualties and losses
Unknown	Heavy losses; several tribal chiefs killed

The Battle of Alameda, also known as the Battle of al-Musarah or Battle of Almuzara (Arabic: معركة المصارة), was fought between the Umayyads and Fihrids in 14-15 May 756 CE near Córdoba. It formed part of the process by which ʿAbd al-Raḥmān I al-Dākhil established an independent Umayyad emirate in al-Andalus, separate from the newly established Abbasid Caliphate based in Iraq which had overthrown the preceding Syria-based Umayyad Caliphate.

== Background ==
Since the Berbers were unwilling to assist him in seizing power, Abd al-Rahman (“al-Dākhil”) decided to cross into Hispania, then divided among the Kalbi, Qaysi, and Yemeni factions. He took advantage of this instability and of the presence of Syrian Umayyad troops led by Balj ibn Bishr, who had organized a number of junds (military districts) that effectively controlled parts of al-Andalus.

His loyal servant Badr prepared the ground and secured local support, allowing Abd al-Rahman to sail from Morocco, landing at Almuñécar on 14 August 755. He settled in Torrox.

In 756, Isbiliya opened its gates to him, after which he advanced on Córdoba, then defended by ʿAbd al-Raḥmān Abū Zayd, son of the governor Yusuf ibn Abd al-Rahman al-Fihri. The latter was defeated at Merch Rahita, and Córdoba was besieged by ten thousand men commanded by Taman ibn Alqamā, one of Abd al-Rahman's earliest supporters.

The Yemeni chief Abu Sabbah Yahya al-Yahsubi attempted to assassinate Abd al-Rahman but was not followed by his men. Shortly afterward, the new emir entered Córdoba and appointed Abu Uthman as governor. However, Yusuf al-Fihri had not laid down his arms: he tried to retake the city by attacking through the Navafría Valley, briefly entering Córdoba before fleeing again when Abd al-Rahman returned with his troops.

== The battle ==
In March 756, Abd al-Rahman entered Seville, which at that time controlled the provinces of Elvira, Sidonia, and Málaga. His forces, composed of Syrians, Yemenis, and Berbers, advanced along the Guadalquivir Valley, while Yusuf marched from his capital Córdoba toward Seville. Upon learning of his opponent’s advance, Yūsuf returned to the capital.

The two armies eventually faced each other on opposite banks of the swollen Guadalquivir River, which could not be crossed. Both forces marched parallel to each other until they reached al-Musara (Alameda), just outside the city of Córdoba.

Negotiations were opened: Yusuf offered one of his daughters in marriage and a dowry of lands. On 13 March, aware of his troops’ exhaustion and the enemy’s superior condition, Abd al-Rahman asked his men whether they preferred peace or battle; they chose battle.

When the river’s level dropped, Abd al-Rahman pretended to accept Yūsuf’s proposal, who even sent animals to feed the Umayyad troops. But at nightfall, Abd al-Rahman's army secretly crossed the river. At that moment, his force numbered about 2,000 cavalry and 3,000 infantry.

At dawn, both sides prepared for battle. Abd al-Rahman placed his infantry in the center, despite a shortage of cavalry on the flanks. Armed only with a bow, he was almost the only one mounted on a true warhorse, surrounded by his most loyal men. Lacking a standard, he improvised one with a green turban tied to a spear, a symbol that later became the banner of the Umayyads of al-Andalus.

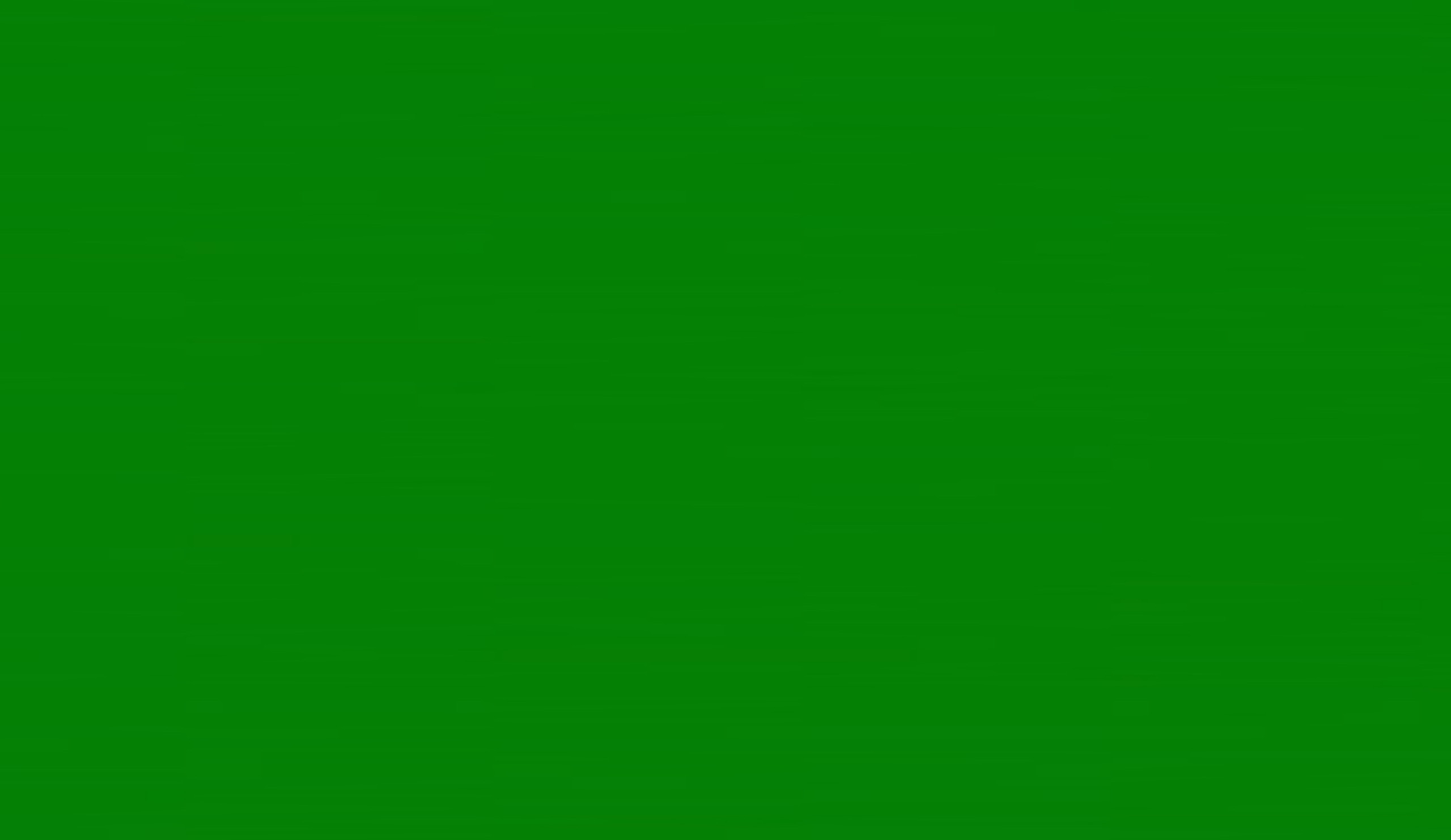
Banner attested as used by Abd al-Rahman I before the battle of Alameda

Yusuf also arranged his troops for combat. The Umayyad cavalry, composed of slaves and Berbers, charged the center and right wing of Yusuf's army. A notable duel took place between Khalid Sudi, Yusuf's slave and cavalry commander, and Habib ibn Abd al-Malik al-Qurashi, commander of the Umayyad cavalry, where the Umayyad general emerged victorious.

During the battle, some Yemenis feared that Abd al-Rahman might flee, since he was on horseback. Hearing this rumor, he called Abu Sabbah Yahya al-Yahsubi and asked for his mule—a gesture that reassured his men.

Eventually, the Umayyad horsemen of Syria led by Habib ibn Abd al-Malik launched a decisive assault on the enemy’s center, killing three infantry commanders; two of them being Yūsuf’s sons, and the other being the son of al-Sumayl ibn Hatim. Yusuf and al-Sumayl fled, abandoning the field and leaving their left flank isolated, which resisted until late in the day before its leaders were slain.

After the Battle of Alameda, fought just outside Córdoba on 14–15 May 756, the Umayyads achieved a complete victory, and several chiefs allied with Yūsuf were killed.

== Aftermath ==
Yusuf ibn Abd al-Rahman al-Fihri and al-Sumayl ibn Hatim al-Kilabi withdrew to Granada. There, on al-Sumayl's advice, Yusuf abdicated his title of malik and recognized Prince Abd al-Rahman I al-Dakhil as emir. The other tribal chiefs likewise acknowledged him, bringing peace to the country.

The new emir ordered that the Friday sermon (khuṭba) no longer mention the Abbasid caliph’s name, signaling the official independence of the Emirate of Córdoba from the Abbasid Caliphate. However, Yusuf and al-Sumayl attempted to recover power once more in 759.

== See also ==
- Abd al-Rahman I
- Habib ibn Abd al-Malik al-Marwani
- Battle of Guadalete
- Umayyad conquest of Hispania
