= Habib ibn Abd al-Malik al-Qurashi =

Umayyad prince, general and governor of Toledo

Habib ibn Abd al-Malik حبيب بن عبد الملك
- Umayyad Governor of Toledo and lord of Porcuna and Cabra
- Born: c. 730
- Died: 778? Córdoba
- Children: Sulayman; Umar al-Walid al-Mubarak; Aban al-Khiyar
Names
- Habib ibn Abd al-Malik ibn Umar ibn al-Walid ibn Abd al-Malik ibn Marwan al-Qurashi al-Marwani
- Dynasty: Umayyad (Marwanid)
- Father: Abd al-Malik ibn Umar ibn al-Walid
- Military career
- Relatives: Al-Walid I (great-grandfather); Umar ibn al-Walid (grandfather); Abd al-Rahman I (cousin)
- Allegiance: Umayyad state of Córdoba
- Service years: c. 750s–778
- Rank: Cavalry commander
- Unit: Syrian cavalry
- Conflicts: Battle of Alameda

Abu Sulaymān Ḥabīb ibn ʿAbd al-Malik ibn ʿUmar ibn al-Walīd ibn Abd al-Malik ibn Marwan al-Qurashī al-Marwānī (حبيب بن عبد الملك بن عمر بن الوليد بن عبد الملك بن مروان القرشي المرواني) (Note: His name has been romanized in Spanish, Portuguese and French literature as Habib ben Ábdo-l-Mélic el Koraixí, Habib ibn Abd-el-Melic el-Koraixi, Habibe ben Addalmálique Al Coraixi Al Meruane, Habib el Coraxí, Habib ben Abdelmélic el Meruani and Habib ben Abd el Melek el Merouani.) was an Umayyad prince and commander in al-Andalus during the reign of the Umayyad emir Abd al-Rahman I.

Habib belonged to a collateral branch of the Umayyad ruling family in al-Andalus and was a descendant of Caliph al-Walid I (r. 705–715). He became a major backer of Abd al-Rahman I's bid to take over al-Andalus and played a decisive command role in the Battle of Alameda, which paved the way for the establishment of the Umayyad emirate of Córdoba. Abd al-Rahman I, who kept him as a trusted adviser, thereafter appointed him as governor of Toledo and granted him extensive land holdings across al-Andalus. Habib's descendants, the eponymous Habibiyyun (Banu Habib), became a prominent cultural family in al-Andalus through the 12th century.

== Background ==
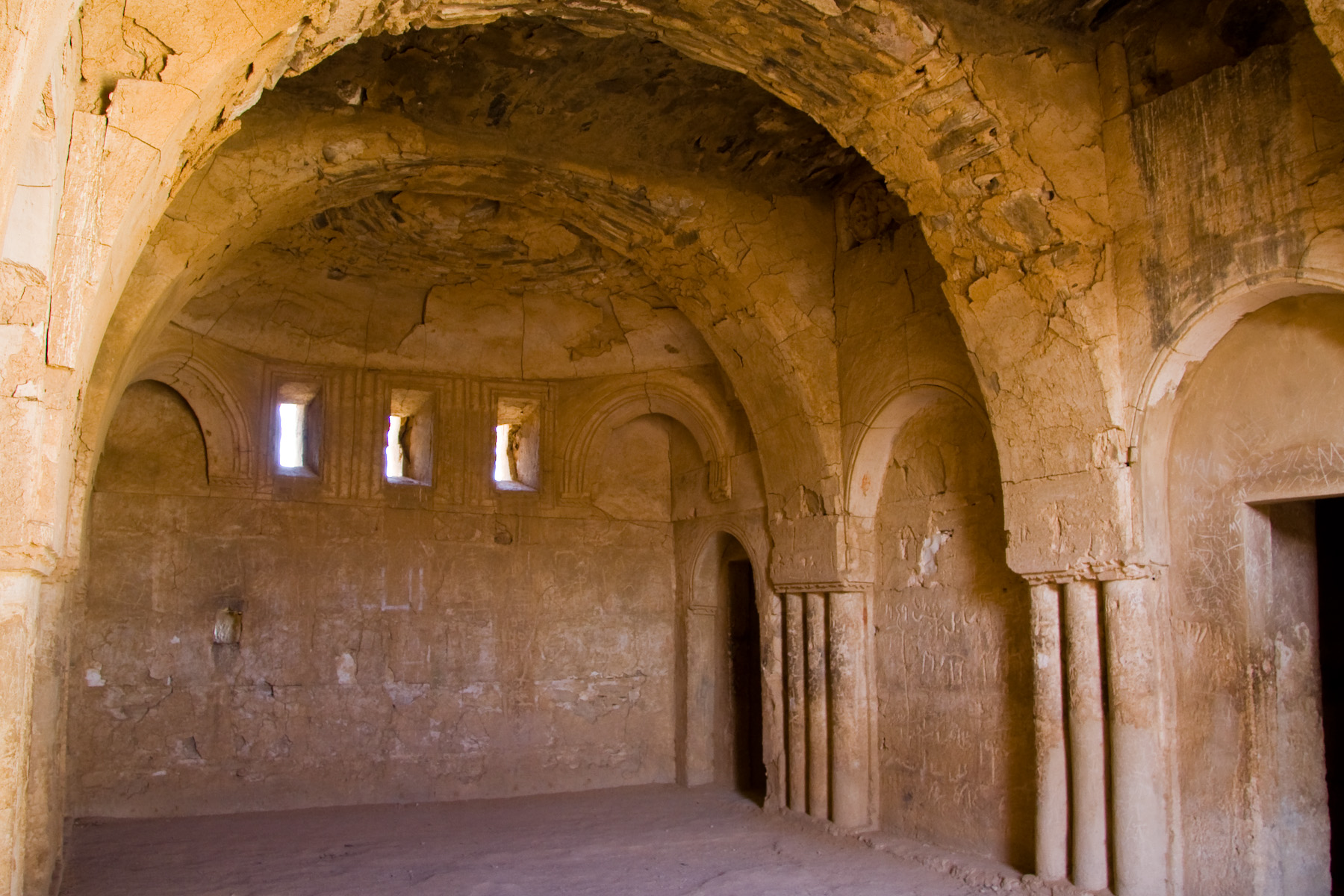
The Qasr Kharana desert palace where an inscription containing the name of Habib's father, Abd al-Malik, was found

Habib's great-grandfather was the Damascus-based Umayyad caliph al-Walid I (r. 705–715). His grandfather was the prince Umar ibn al-Walid, who was known to have fathered so many children he was nicknamed Fahl Bani Marwan ('the Stallion of the Marwanids', who were the ruling branch of the Umayyad dynasty). Habib's father, Abd al-Malik, was the son of Umar and his Umayyad wife Umm Abd Allah bint Habib, whose father (Habib's namesake) was a son of al-Hakam ibn Abi al-As, the ancestor of the Marwanids. Abd al-Malik's name was mentioned in an inscription in his father's Qasr Kharana desert palace in modern Jordan.

After the toppling of the Umayyads by the Abbasids in 750, the new rulers engaged in purges of the Umayyad family. The most notable of these was the massacre of Nahr Abi Futrus (the Antipatris in Palestine), where an Abbasid general invited the family to a peace banquet as a ruse to lure and trap them. Dozens of Umayyads were killed, including twenty-one direct descendants of al-Walid I.

== Life ==
Map of al-Andalus and its chief centers, 719 CE

Habib fled Syria after the massacre at Nahr Abi Futrus and took refuge in al-Andalus (Islamic Spain). (Note: Habib was among several Umayyads from across the Caliphate who found refuge in al-Andalus. Among them were Habib's first cousin, al-Abbas ibn Isa ibn Umar ibn al-Walid, whose son Ibrahim became the qadi (chief judge) of Córdoba) He arrived there prior to his cousin Abd al-Rahman ibn Mu'awiya, a grandson of Caliph Hisham (r. 724–743) and the future Umayyad emir of Córdoba Abd al-Rahman I. Habib backed Abd al-Rahman upon the latter's arrival and supported his ambitions to rule the region.

On the eve of the Battle of al-Musara (also known as 'Alameda') between Abd al-Rahman and the governor of al-Andalus, Yusuf al-Fihri, Habib was entrusted with command of the Umayyad cavalry and played a decisive role in securing victory. According to the historian Elias Terés, the battled "decide[d] the fate of the throne" of Córdoba. In light of his role in the battle, Abd al-Rahman kept Habib as a close confidant.

Subsequently, Habib was appointed governor of Toledo, a strategic center in al-Andalus which had previously been under the control of the Fihrids, supporters of the former governor. Habib governed with vigor, maintaining order and preventing rebellion. Toledo served as his base of operations in suppressing several uprisings, notably that of the Berber leader Shakya in 768, as well as other lesser insurrections.

Habib captured the fortress of Sopetrán in Guadalajara, the principal stronghold of the Berbers, and in 778 he countered the rebellion of the qaʾid (commander) al-Sulami. Abd al-Rahman granted Habib extensive estates around Córdoba, Cabra, Rayyu (Málaga and Archidona) and Porcuna. Habib also seized numerous lands, often without legal justification; on one occasion, when a Cordoban judge ruled in favor of the dispossessed, the emir personally compensated them from his own funds to allow his cousin Habib to retain the estates.

== Death and legacy ==
The exact date of Habib's death is unknown, but according to José Antonio Conde he died around 778. His death caused great grief to Abd al-Rahman, which the medieval sources detail.

Habib had several sons, namely Sulayman, al-Mubarak, Umar, Aban, al-Khiyar, and al-Walid. Habib's descendants, the al-Habibiyyun, were a distinguished family that produced several notable men of letters and science, and from which also descended the branch known as the Banu Dahhun. Among his descendants were the poets Habib Dahhun and Bishr ibn Habib Dahhun, renowned poets of the reign of Abd al-Rahman II, and Sa'id ibn Hisham ibn Dahhun, a poet of the 12th century.

== See also ==
- Abd al-Malik ibn Umar ibn Marwan

== Bibliography ==
- Abu Mustafa, Kamal al-Sayyid (1997). دراسات أندلسية في التاريخ والحضارة [Andalusian Studies in History and Civilization] (in Arabic). Alexandria, Egypt: Alexandria Book Center.
- Al Buainain, Ghanem Bin Fadl Ghanem (2016-11-12). "حركات التمرد في عهد عبد الرحمن الداخل – مجلة الأندلس" [Rebellion Movements during the Reign of Abd al-Rahman I] (in Arabic).
- Alcántara, Emilio Lafuente y (1867). Ajbar machmuâ: (colección de tradiciones) [Collection of Traditions] (in Spanish). Madrid: Rivadeneyra.
- Arellano, Rafael Ramírez de (1917). Historia de Córdoba: Época musulmana [History of Córdoba: Muslim Era] (in Spanish). Ciudad-Real: Establecimiento Tip. del Hospicio Provincial.
- Bisheh, Ghazi (1992). "The Umayyad Monuments Between Muwaqqar and Azraq: Palatial Residences or Caravanserais?". In Kerner, Susanne (ed.). The Near East in Antiquity: German Contributions to the Archaeology of Jordan, Palestine, Syria, Lebanon, and Egypt, Volume 3. Amman: Al-Kutba. pp. 35–41.
- Blankinship, Khalid Yahya (1994). The End of the Jihâd State: The Reign of Hishām ibn ʻAbd al-Malik and the Collapse of the Umayyads. Albany, New York: State University of New York Press. ISBN 978-0-7914-1827-7.
- Conde, José Antonio (1854). History of the Dominion of the Arabs in Spain. H. G. Bohn.
- Ibn Hazm (1901). Jamharat ansab al-Arab [Collection of Arab Geneaologies] (in Arabic). Rufoof.
- Ibn Hazm (2018). Jamharat ansab al-Arab [Collection of Arab Geneaologies] (in Arabic). Dar Al Kotob Al Ilmiyah. ISBN 978-2-7451-0043-6.
- En-Naciri es-Slaoui, Ahmed Ben Khalid (1923). Kitāb el-istiqça li akhbār doual el-Maghrib el-Aqça [History of Morocco] (in French). Translated by A. Graulle. Paris: Librairie orientaliste Paul Geuthner.
- Robinson, Chase F. (2010). "The Violence of the Abbasid Revolution". In Suleiman, Yasir (ed.). Living Islamic History: Studies in Honour of Professor Carole Hillenbrand. Edinburgh: Edinburgh University Press. pp. 226–251. ISBN 978-0-7486-3738-6.
- Robinson, Majied (2020). Marriage in the Tribe of Muhammad: A Statistical Study of Early Arabic Genealogical Literature. Berlin: Walter de Gruyter. ISBN 9783110624168.
- Scales, Peter C. (1994). The Fall of the Caliphate of Córdoba: Berbers and Andalusis in Conflict. Leiden: Brill.
- Terés, Elias (1970). "Dos familias marwāníes de al-Andalus". Al-Andalus. 35: 93–117.
- Terés, E. (1971). "Ḥabīb b. ʿAbd al-Malik al-Kuras̲h̲ī al-Marwānī". In Lewis, B.; Ménage, V. L.; Pellat, Ch. & Schacht, J. (eds.). The Encyclopaedia of Islam, Second Edition. Volume III: H–Iram. Leiden: E. J. Brill. pp. 11–12. OCLC 495469525.
