= Al-Ala ibn Mughith al-Judhami =

Abbāsid-appointed governor of al-Andalus (died 763)

Al-ʿAlāʾ ibn Mughīth (Note: Some sources use the spelling Mughīṭ, others use the definite article, i.e., al-Mughīth.) (Arabic: العلاء بن مغيث), called variously al-Yaḥṣubī, al-Ḥaḍramī or al-Judhāmī, was the ʿAbbāsid-appointed governor of al-Andalus (Spain) in opposition to the Umayyads in AD 763 (AH 146). (Note: Some sources place the event in AH 144 or 145.)

The chronicles disagree about al-ʿAlāʾ ibn Mughīth's origins. The Fatḥ al-Andalus, Ibn al-Athīr, al-Nuwayrī and al-Maḳḳarī claim that he was a native of Ifrīḳiya (Tunisia) sent to Spain by the ʿAbbāsid caliph al-Manṣūr (r. 754–775). On the other hand, the Akhbār majmūʿa, Ibn al-Ḳūṭiyya and Ibn ʿIdhārī claim that he was from Beja in southwestern al-Andalus, where he held the local office of riyāsa (political and military headship). The historian Roger Collins inclines to the view that he was a foreigner sent by the caliph. Maribel Fierro is of the opinion that later chronicles confused Ibn Mughīth with his successor, thereby concocting an African origin for him.

Al-ʿAlāʾ ibn Mughīth set up his government in 763 in Beja, where he had the support of the local Egyptian jund (Arab army division). Although Islamic historiography and much modern historiography treats this event as an internal rebellion against the Umayyads, it is better viewed as conflict over legitimate authority between two rival caliphal lines. The temporary success of Ibn Mughīth is evidence that there existed support for the ʿAbbāsid claim in al-Andalus.

The Umayyad emir (Note: The Umayyads of Spain did not take the caliphal title until the 10th century.) ʿAbd al-Raḥmān I (r. 756–788) avoided a pitched battle with his rival and even abandoned his capital, Córdoba, for the fortress of Carmona. Al-ʿAlāʾ ibn Mughīth besieged Carmona for two months, which suggests that the forces available to ʿAbd al-Raḥmān I were not large. Many Andalusī leaders must have been awaiting the result of the conflict before deciding which side to support. The Syrian jund of Seville, which had Yaḥṣubī members, may have gone over to Ibn Mughīth. According to the Akhbār majmūʿa, the Palestinian jund under Ghiyāth ibn ʿAlḳama al-Lakhmī marched from Sidonia to join the siege but was intercepted by an army under Badr, a freedman of ʿAbd al-Raḥmān, who negotiated its withdrawal.

The siege was ended when a well-timed sortie by the defenders caught the besiegers unprepared. Ibn Mughīth and the other ʿAbbāsid leaders were killed in the fighting. His head was secretly sent to Kairouan as a warning to other would-be ʿAbbāsid governors. Some sources have it sent, less plausibly, to Mecca.

The next ʿAbbāsid governor, ʿAbd al-Raḥmān ibn Ḥabīb al-Ṣiqlābī, was sent from Ifrīḳiya in 777.
