= Ubayd Allah Abu Marwan =

9th-century general serving Emir Abd ar-Rahman II

Ubayd Allah (Arabic: عبيد الله), known as Abu Marwan (Arabic: أبو مروان), was a general in the service of Emir Abd ar-Rahman II of Córdoba. He was an uncle of the Emir Al-Hakam I.

In 826, Aissó revolted and requested help from Abd ar-Rahman, who sent the general Abu Marwan. The army arrived in Zaragoza in May 827. From there Aby Marwan's forces passed into territory of the county of Barcelona, reaching Barcelona in the summer. It besieged Barcelona without success, ransacking the city's environs. Abu Marwan then moved on to Girona, which he attempted to occupy on October 10, 827. The Emperor Louis the Pious, knowing of the Muslim raid, ordered his son Pepin I of Aquitaine and the counts Hugh of Tours and Matfrid of Orléans to recruit an army, but the recruitment was slow and by the time it was formed, Abu Marwan and his army had returned to Muslim territory. The rebels abandoned the country with them (827).
