= Siege of Carmona (763) =

Date	763
Location	Carmona, Spain 37°28′N 5°38′W
Result	Umayyad victory

Belligerents
Emirate of Cordoba	Abbasid Caliphate

Commanders and leaders
Abd al-Rahman I	al-Ala ibn Mughith al-Judhami †; Umayya ibn Qatan (POW)

Strength
700 men	Unknown

Casualties and losses
Unknown	2,000 killed
- Location in Spain

The siege of Carmona (763) was a decisive military engagement between the Umayyad Emirate of Cordoba, led by Abd al-Rahman I, and an Abbasid-backed expeditionary force in Andalusia. Triggered by an uprising aligned with the Abbasid Caliphate, the conflict ended in a crushing Umayyad victory that effectively ended Abbasid military interference in the Iberian Peninsula.

== Background ==
In 763, Al-Ala ibn Mughith al-Judhami set up his government in Beja, backed by the local Egyptian jund (Arab army division). The Abbasid caliph, al-Mansur, made a final attempt to bring Andalusia under Abbasid control, providing Al-Ala with funds, arms, and moral backing. Al-Ala raised the Abbasid flag and appointed himself governor. Although Islamic historiography and traditional accounts treat this as an internal rebellion, modern historians view it as a contest of legitimate authority between rival claimants, demonstrating tangible local support for the Abbasid cause in al-Andalus.

Unwilling to risk a pitched battle against superior numbers, the Umayyad emir Abd al-Rahman I (r. 756–788) abandoned his capital of Córdoba and withdrew to the strong hill fortress of Carmona.

== The Siege ==
Al-Ala besieged the fortress for two months. The prolonged duration suggests that Abd al-Rahman's available garrison was small—numbering around 700 men—and that many Andalusian leaders and tribal units were watching from the sidelines to see who would prevail before committing their allegiance. According to the Akhbār majmūʿa, the Palestinian jund of Seville and Sidonia marched to join the siege under Ghiyāth ibn Alḳama al-Lakhmī, but they were intercepted and negotiated into withdrawing by Badr, a freedman and commander loyal to Abd al-Rahman.

Eventually, recognizing that the besiegers were growing complacent, Abd al-Rahman ordered his men to burn the scabbards of their swords. This symbolic act of no retreat inspired his 700 soldiers to launch a sudden, ferocious sortie that completely surprised the Abbasid camp. Al-Ala and many of his principal officers were killed in the fighting.

== Aftermath ==
The fallen Abbasid commanders were beheaded, and Al-Ala's head was embalmed and sent eastward to Kairouan as a grim message of defiance to Caliph al-Mansur.

The debacle at Carmona extinguished the threat of direct Abbasid expansion into al-Andalus, leaving both Cordoba and Baghdad preoccupied with domestic challenges. Upon hearing the news of the defeat and the death of his commander, al-Mansur reportedly remarked:

We all belong to God. We sent this miserable man to his death. Praise be to God who has put the sea between me and this devil.

== Sources ==
- Kennedy, Hugh (2014). Muslim Spain and Portugal: A Political History of al-Andalus. Routledge. ISBN 978-1-317-87041-8.
- Flood, Timothy M. (2018). Rulers and Realms in Medieval Iberia, 711–1492. McFarland. ISBN 978-1-4766-7471-1.
- Venning, Timothy (2017). A Chronology of Early Medieval Western Europe: 450–1066. Routledge. ISBN 978-1-351-58916-1.
- Brill, ed. (1993). First Encyclopaedia of Islam: 1913–1936. Brill. ISBN 978-90-04-09796-4.
- Collins, Roger (1989). The Arab Conquest of Spain, 710–797. Blackwell. ISBN 9780631194057.
- Manzano Moreno, Eduardo (1998). Marín, Manuela (ed.). The Settlement and Organisation of the Syrian Junds in Al-Andalus. Routledge. pp. 85–114. ISBN 978-0-86078-708-2.
