= Al-Hakam I =

Emir of Córdoba from 796 to 822

Al-Hakam I الحكم الأول
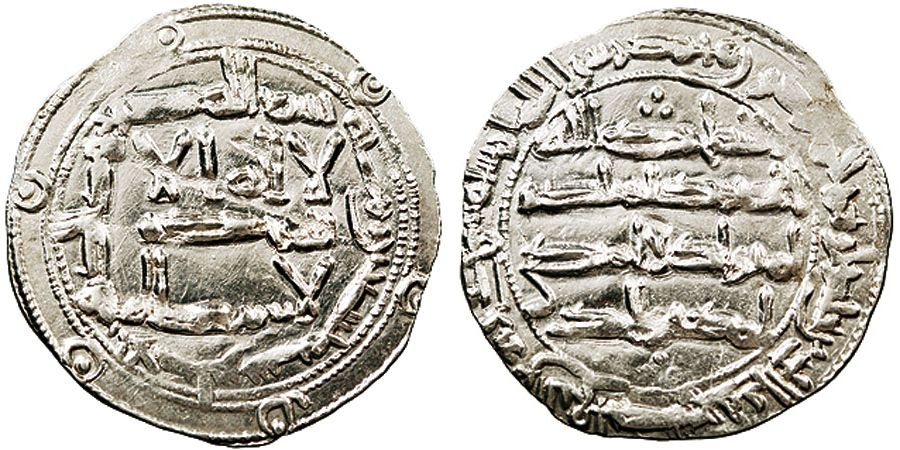
- Silver Dirham under his rule

3rd Emir of Córdoba
- Reign: 12 June 796– 21 May 822
- Predecessor: Hisham I
- Successor: Abd ar-Rahman II
- Born: 771; Córdoba
- Died: May 21, 822 (aged 50–51); Córdoba
- Issue: Abd al-Rahman II
- Dynasty: Umayyad (Marwanid)
- Father: Hisham I
- Mother: Zokhrouf
- Religion: Islam

Abu al-As al-Hakam ibn Hisham ibn Abd al-Rahman (Arabic: الحكم بن هشام بن عبد الرحمن) was Umayyad Emir of Cordoba from 796 until 822 in Al-Andalus (Moorish Iberia).

== Biography ==
He is complete contrast to his father Hisham I, Al-Hakam I evoked the brash, masculine Arab ideal of the pre-Islamic era. A striking physical figure said to be tall, dark, and slim, he would personally lead his troops into battle. He enjoyed both wine and women in quantity, cultivated his talents as a poet and orator, and promoted learning and high culture. Cunning and shrewd, he did not hesitate to unleash his violent fury to intimidate his subjects; his moves were calculated and he was determined to strengthen the kingdom, stopping at nothing to do so. This did little, however, to endear him to the religious elite, who preferred the pious near-asceticism of his father

Al-Hakam I was the second son of his father, his older brother having died at an early age. When he came to power, he was challenged by his uncles Sulayman and Abdallah, sons of his grandfather Abd ar-Rahman I. After a fouryear struggle, Sulayman was captured in an engagement with Al-Hakam I's forces, handed over to the amir, and executed. His head was paraded on a pike around the streets of Córdoba before his remains were interred in the royal mausoleum alongside those of his father, Abd ar-Rahman I.

Abdallah took his two sons Ubayd Allah and Abd al-Malik to the court of Charlemagne in Aix-la-Chapelle to negotiate for aid which come to nothing. Abdallah was pardoned, but was forced to stay in Valencia. Al-Hakam I granted him lordship and a free hand over Valencia and the east coast of al-Andalus, together with a rich pension, on the condition he not leave that territory. To seal the arrangement, al-Hakam gave two of his sisters in marriage to his uncle’s sons, thus reconciling the family split according to Arab tradition. One of the sons, ‘Ubayd Allah, went on to become a faithful general for Al-Hakam I

Al-Hakam spent much of his reign suppressing rebellions in Toledo, Saragossa and Mérida. The uprisings twice reached Cordoba. An attempt was made to dethrone Al-Hakam and replace him with his cousin, Mohammed ibn al-Kasim, but the plot was discovered. On 16 November 806, 72 nobles and their attendants (accounts talk of 5,000) were massacred at a banquet, crucified and displayed along the banks of the river Guadalquivir. Such displays of cruelty were not unusual during this period, with the heads of rebel leaders or Christian foes killed in expeditions to the north being put on show at the gates of Cordoba.

Following the rebellion in Cordoba, Al-Hakam established a personal bodyguard, the Al-Haras, led by the Visigothic leader of the Christians in Cordoba, the Comes (Count) Rabi, son of Theodulf, who also served as the Emir's tax collector. Rabi was later removed and executed by crucifixion for corruption.

In 818 he crushed a rebellion led by clerics in the suburb of al-Ribad on the south bank of the Guadalquivir river. Some 300 notables were captured and crucified, while the rest of the inhabitants were exiled. Some moved to Alexandria in Egypt, some to Fez and Crete, where they formed an emirate. Others joined the Levantine pirates.

== Rebellion Of Toledo ==
In 796, the people of Toledo, mostly native converts to Islam with little affinity for foreigners, perennially discontented and still smarting at the decline of their city, expelled their governor, the haughty Bahlul ibn Marzuk. A descendant of Basque converts, Ibn Marzuk then headed for Zaragoza and the northern borderlands of al-Andalus. There he declared his independence and began to wage war on the local Umayyad faithful, the Arab Banu Salama, and the indigenous Banu Qasi. Al-Hakam I, busy with his brothers, called on a loyal muwallad, ‘Amrus ibn Yusuf, who restored order through quick and decisive military action and fortified key points in the territory to brace against future unrest. Having decided once and for all to deal with the people of Toledo, Al-Hakam I turned once again to ‘Amrus. It was here, the chroniclers claim, that the amir would demonstrate his ruthless calculation as never before.

‘Amrus arrived in Toledo in 797 and assembled the notables of the city, informing them that he, a fellow native, despised the amir just as they did. Having thus won their confidence, he announced he would be holding a banquet to honor the visit of Al-Hakam I's fourteen-year-old heir, ‘Abd al-Rahman, to the city. On the appointed day, the prince arrived, a feast was laid out, and the aristocracy assembled outside the governor’s palace where they were instructed to enter separately in small groups. It was a trap. As each group entered the palace, they were directed through a narrow corridor, emerging from which they were ambushed by executioners and put to the sword in front of the young crown prince, their bodies then dumped unceremoniously into the moat. As the story goes, the sound of the musicians who were playing masked the screams, as seven hundred leading citizens marched unwittingly to their deaths. Although the story of the “Day of the Moat” is certainly a fiction (the banquet/massacre is a common literary trope), it reflects the amir’s determination to terrorize the local elite into acquiescence. With Toledo pacified, by 806 ‘Amrus was sent back to the Upper March, where the Banu Qasi had now risen in alliance with the petty Christian rulers of neighboring Pamplona, Álava, and the Cerdanya.

== First Cordoba Uprising ==
In 800, a group of leading officials and jurists in Córdoba secretly approached al-Hakam’s cousin Muhammad ibn Qasim, offering toinstall him as amir. But Muhammad was loyal and betrayed the conspirators, seventy-two of whom, many of high rank and prestige, were placed under arrest and executed, their crucifixes lining the banks of the Guadalquivir as a mute warning to would-be conspirators. Al-Hakam showed no mercy; among the ‘ulama’ caught up in his vengeance was Yahya ibn Mudar, a venerable figure who had studied law under Malik ibn Anas himself. This act of revenge did little to calm the populace, and fearing another coup, Al-Hakam I strengthened the city’s fortifications and had his uncles Maslama and Umayya, who had been held in prison since the reign of Hisham I, killed. He also reconstituted his personal bodyguard, assembling a troop of Frankish warriors, including prisoners who had been captured on the 793 raid against Narbonne and mercenaries from the Christian North. Known as al-Hurs, “the Silent Ones,” because they could speak no Arabic, these foreign Christians were hated by the Muslim populace, hence al-Hakam could count on their absolute loyalty.

== Second Cordoba Uprising ==
To finance his military operations, the amir imposed new taxes, a policy decried as un-Islamic, given that according to th Qur’an, Muslims were to be subject to only two taxes: the ‘ushr, or “tenth,” on income, and the sadaqa, a mandatory alms tax. The clerics were particularly indignant because the amir tolerated public vice, notably the sale of wine, to generate income. In the years that followed, Córdoba simmered as Al-Hakam I, frequently absent to squelch other local rebellions, left the capital in the hands of overly proud agents and his increasingly hated palace guard. The breaking point came in the spring of 818, when the city folk rose in a rebellion sparked by the killing of a townsman by a member of the palace guard, and the amir’s tone-deaf and violent response to the protests that followed. The epicenter was the neighborhood known as Shaqunda (from the Latin “Secunda”), across the Roman bridge on the southern bank of the Guadalquivir. Populated mainly by recent converts, it was home to workers and craftsmen and was fertile ground for religious agitation. With the encouragement of a leading faqih, a general strike was called. Finally, the townsfolk took up their weapons and poured across the bridge to storm the city. Disaster was averted only by the swift action of Al-Hakam I’s cousin ‘Ubayd Allah ibn ‘Abd Allah, who led a body of troops out of a side gate and surprised the rebels from behind. The slaughter lasted for three days as Al-Hakam I turned Shaqunda over to his troops for looting, swearing he would raze the suburb and sow wheat fields where it had stood. Houses were sacked, women were seized as slaves, and boys were taken and castrated. On the fourth day, the amir ordered a halt and issued his verdict: three hundred leading citizens were to be publicly crucified, and the entire surviving population of Shaqunda—thousands of Muslims, as well as Christians and Jews—were given four days to leave al-Andalus. Some made their way to Fez, where a local prince, Idris II, welcomed them, and others went as far as Egypt.

== Death ==
Al-Hakam I died in 822 after having ruled for 26 years.

== Family ==
Al-Hakam was the son of Hisham I, Emir of Cordoba and a concubine named Zokhrouf.

Al Hakam fathered five children with his wife Halawah:

- Abd ar-Rahman II, Umayyad Emir of Córdoba 822–852
- al-Mughira
- Said
- Umayya
- al-Walid bin al-Hakam. He led an army to attack Galicia in 838.

Al-Hakam had a concubine named Ajab. She established a foundation for lepers in the suburbs of Cordoba. The leper colony was funded by the proceeds of the Munyat 'Ajab, an estate built for or named after Ajab. Ajab was the mother of:

- Abu Abd Al-Malik Marwan

Another concubine was named Mut'a. She established a cemetery which was still in existence in the 10th century.

Al-Hakam I Banu Umayyah Cadet branch of the Banu Quraish
| Preceded by Hisham I | Emir of Córdoba; 796–822 | Succeeded by Abd ar-Rahman II |
