= Ourferdjouma =

The Ourferdjouma or Urfedjouma, Warfajuma were a large Nefzaoua Sufrite Berber tribe. After capturing Kairouan in 757-758 from the Fihrids, the Ourferdjouma plundered the city and massacred the population. These atrocities and the desecration of the Grand Mosque of Kairouan provoked the Ibadi Berbers who after capturing Tripoli, occupied Kairouan in 758 putting an end to their terror.

In the 10th century, they participated with the Fatimids against the revolt of Abu Yazid. Ibn Khaldun states that the tribe of Urfedjouma was reduced to such a degree of weakness that it eventually dispersed and the remnants of its people merged into the ranks of the other tribes.

== See also ==
- Habib ibn Abd al-Rahman al-Fihri

== Sources ==
- Ibn Khaldun, Histoire des Berbères et des dynasties musulmanes de l'Afrique, 1852 transl. Algiers.
