= Abd al-Rahman ibn Habib al-Fihri =

Arab ruler of Ifriqiya (North Africa) from 745 to 755

Emir of Ifriqiya
- Reign: February-March 745 – May-June 755
- Predecessor: Hanzala ibn Safwan al-Kalbi (as governor of Ifriqiya)
- Successor: Ilyas ibn Habib al-Fihri
- Died: May-June 755; Kairouan
- Cause of death: Stabbing From shoulder to chest
- Spouse: Daughter of Ali ibn Rabah al-Lakhmi
- Issue: Habib ibn Abd al-Rahman, Emir of Ifriqiya; Yusuf ibn Abd al-Rahman, Emir of al-Andalus
- House: Fihrids
- Father: Habib ibn Abi Ubayda al-Fihri
- Mother: Berber women from Aures Mountains

Abd al-Rahman ibn Habib al-Fihri (Arabic: عبد الرحمن بن حبيب الفهري) (died 755) was an Arab noble of the Fihrid family, and ruler of Ifriqiya from 745 through 755 AD.

== Background ==
Abd al-Rahman ibn Habib was a great-grandson of Uqba ibn Nafi al-Fihri (Muslim Arab conqueror of North Africa). His family, the al-Fihris, were among the leading Arab families of the Maghreb.

In 740, Ibn Habib joined his father Habib ibn Abi Obeida in an Arab expedition across the water to Sicily in what was possibly the first attempt at a full-scale invasion of the island (rather than a mere raid). They had a successful landing and laid a brief siege to Syracuse, securing its submission and agreement to pay tribute. But the break-out of the Great Berber Revolt in the Maghreb forced the al-Fihris to cease their invasion of Sicily and ship their army quickly back to North Africa to help quell the uprising. The Arabs were defeated by the Berbers at the Battle of Bagdoura (near the Sebou) in 741. His father was killed in the field of battle, while Abd al-Rahman ibn Habib narrowly escaped and fled across the straits to Spain with the remnant of the Arab army.

While in Spain, Ibn Habib involved himself in the conflicts which immediately erupted between the commanders of the defeated army (the Syrian regiments or junds)), and the resident governor, Abd al-Malik ibn Qatn al-Fihri. When the Syrian commander Balj ibn Bishr al-Qushayri tortured and executed the elderly Ibn Qatn, a Fihrid relative, Abd al-Rahman ibn Habib openly broke with the Syrians and joined the Andalusian (baladi) party. Ibn Habib participated in the Battle of Aqua Portora in August 742 and it was claimed by at least one chronicler (Ibn al-Khatam) that he sought out and fatally wounded Balj in the heat of battle (although the chronicler may have confused Ibn Habib with another Abd al-Rahman, Ibn al-Qama al-Lakhmi, the governor of Narbonne and commander of the Andalusians).

In the aftermath, Abd al-Rahman ibn Habib tried to put himself forward as a candidate to replace the governor, but gave up on these ambitions with the arrival of Abu al-Khattar ibn Dirar al-Kalbi as Andalusian governor in 743, who then set about pacifying the situation.

Soon after, Ibn Habib left Spain and returned to Ifriqiya (although, apparently, he may have left his son, Yusuf, behind). Ibn Habib may have served briefly under the Kairouan governor, Handhala ibn Safwan al-Kalbi, in a variety of military capacities, including command of the Tunis garrison.

== Tunisian Coup ==
In late 744, in the turmoil following the death of the Umayyad caliph, Hisham, Abd al-Rahman ibn Habib assembled a small force in Tunis and declared himself emir of Ifriqiya. Although urged to quash the usurper, the Ifriqiyan governor Handhala ibn Safwan al-Kalbi decided it was best to avoid bloodshed and consented to return to Damascus in February 745, rather than put up a fight.

Nonetheless, on departure, Handhala ibn Safwan laid a curse on the usurper: "Oh God, do not permit Abd al-Rahman ibn Habib to enjoy his usurped authority! Let his partisans derive no profit from this attempt, may they shed each other's blood! Send against them, O Lord, the most evil of all the men You have created!" Handhala extended the curse to Ifriqiya itself, the land and its ungrateful people, invoking upon them famine, pestilence and war. As it turned out, save from some brief seasonal interruptions, Ifriqiya was indeed gripped by pestilence for the next seven years.

== Ruler in Ifriqiya ==
Abd al-Rahman ibn Habib had come to power essentially as the figurehead of the local Arab high military caste, a group much despised and feared by the common population. Their appetites and aspirations had long been kept in check by the Umayyad governors. But with the connection with Damascus now cut, the high nobles fully expected to be allowed free rein by 'their' emir. But they were soon to be disappointed. Ibn Habib wanted a country to govern, and was not prepared to see it fragmented and handed over to the anarchic ways of a feudal nobility. Ibn Habib consequently faced the prospect of revolts whatever he did - should the nobles be let loose, the people would revolt; hold the reins tight, the nobles would turn against him. To assert himself Ibn Habib consequently turned to his greatest asset - his family, the Fihrids.

No sooner had Ibn Habib installed himself in Kairouan, then revolts by Arabs and Berbers, began erupting all over the country. Tunis was raised to revolt by Orwa ibn ez-Zobeir es-Sadefi, Tabinas by Ibn Attaf el-Azdi, Béja was taken by the Sanhaja Berber rebel Thabit al-Sanhaji, and many more. Ibn Habib patiently and ruthlessly crushed the revolts one by one.

The most serious threat came from Tripolitana, then governed by Ibn Habib's brother Ilyas ibn Habib al-Fihri. In 747, Ilyas tried to crack down on the fledgling Ibadites, a puritanical Kharijite sect, that was growing strong in the cities of Djerba and Tripoli and among the Berbers in the surrounding districts. The Ibadites, inspired by the success of their brethren in Hadramut and Oman, revolted under the leadership of their imam al-Harith, and seized control of much of Tripolitana (between Gabès and Sirte). But in 752, Ibn Habib dispatched an Ifriqiyan army and reconquered Tripolitana from the Ibadites, driving their remnants south into the Jebel Nafusa.

In Spain, Handhala's deputy Abu al-Khattar ibn Dirar al-Kalbi had been toppled in 745 and civil war broke out anew between the Syrian junds and the Andalusian Arabs. Ibn Habib intervened, dispatching an Ifriqiyan force to help restore order. In 747, Ibn Habib's kinsman (by patronymic record, his son), Yusuf ibn 'Abd al-Rahman al-Fihri, was put forward as a compromise candidate and installed as governor of al-Andalus.

But the western Maghreb - Morocco and eastern Algeria - remained out of his reach. Since the Berber Revolt of 740, the region had descended into tribal anarchy. It was fragmented and ruled autonomously by Berber tribes. The Masmuda Berber tribes established an independent state in 744, the Berghwata confederation, with their own 'prophet' and syncretist beliefs. Ibn Habib's attempts to reimpose his rule there failed.

In 752, perhaps feeling confident in the possession of his lands for the first time, Ibn Habib transported an Ifriqiyan army to Sicily, perhaps hoping to resume the invasion his father had interrupted back in 740. But finding the defences too strong, the expedition limited itself to raiding the coasts and returned to North Africa.

== Relations with the Caliphs ==
Ibn Habib also tried to repair his relations with Damascus. After repeated entreaties, he finally managed to secure confirmation in his post from the Umayyad Caliph Marwan II. Marwan II did not really have any options, for at that time, his resources were engaged in fending off the Abbasid Revolution.

Egypt fell to the Abbasids in the middle of 750 and the last Umayyad caliph Marwan II was caught and killed. Hoping the chaos in the east would allow him to carve out an independent state for himself, Ifriqiyan governor Ibn Habib at first sought an understanding with the Abbasids but was soon disappointed by Abbasid demands for submission. Ibn Habib then decided to revolt against the Abbasids and dropped the name of the Abbasid caliph from the Friday prayers, publicly burnt the official robes of state dispatched by the Abbasids and invited the fleeing members of the Umayyad clan to take refuge in his dominions. Among his guests was the Umayyad prince, Abd al-Rahman ibn Mu’awiya ibn Hisham, a grandson of Caliph Hisham. Two other notables, sons of the caliph Walid II, were appointed to high posts, one of them made qadi of Kairouan. His own brother, Ilyas ibn Habib, married into the Umayyad family.

But not long after their arrival, Ibn Habib changed his mind, probably fearing the prominent Umayyad exiles might serve as a focal point for discontented Arab nobles and challenge his own usurped power. Ibn Habib expressed sufficient hostility to prompt the fugitive Umayyad prince to flee into the hinterlands of Kabylie and hide among the Nafza Berbers (his mother's family). In 755, Abd al-Rahman left his African hideout and crossed the straits to Spain and went on to depose Yusuf al-Fihri and found the Umayyad emirate of Córdoba in 756.

In 755, Ibn Habib discovered what he thought was a plot engineered by the Umayyad qadi, and ordered the arrest and execution of the plotters. But he didn't count on the revenge of his sister-in-law, the Umayyad wife of his brother Ilyas. Later that year, urged on by his wife, Ilyas assassinated his brother Abd al-Rahman ibn Habib in his personal quarters, plunging a dagger into his back while he played with his children.

Ilyas ibn Habib proceeded to assume power for himself, but was himself deposed and killed by the end of the year by Abd al-Rahman's son, Habib ibn Abd al-Rahman al-Fihri.

In 757, the Warfajuma Berbers and their Sufrite allies swept up from southern Tunisia and captured Kairouan, killing Habib and putting an end to the Fihrid dynasty. In the meantime, the Ibadites that Ibn Habib had driven out of Tripoli came back. Rallied by their imam Abu al-Khattab al-Ma'afiri in Jebel Nefusa, the Ibadites recaptured Tripoli and went on to take Kairouan from the Berbers in 758, establishing a Kharijite imamate over Ifriqiya.

Preceded by Handhala ibn Safwan al-Kalbi	Governor of Ifriqiya; 745–755	Succeeded by Ilyas ibn Habib al-Fihri

== Sources ==
- Ibn Khaldun, Histoire des Berbères et des dynasties musulmanes de l'Afrique, 1852 transl. Algiers.
- Julien, Charles-André, Histoire de l'Afrique du Nord, des origines à 1830, édition originale 1931, réédition Payot, Paris, 1961
- Kennedy, Hugh Muslim Spain and Portugal: A Political History of al-Andalus, New York and London: Longman, 1996.
- Mercier, E. (1888) Histoire de l'Afrqiue septentrionale, V. 1, Paris: Leroux. Repr. Elibron Classics, 2005.
