= Hisham I of Córdoba =

Emir of Córdoba from 788 to 796

Hisham I Al-Reda هشام بن عبد الرحمن الداخل
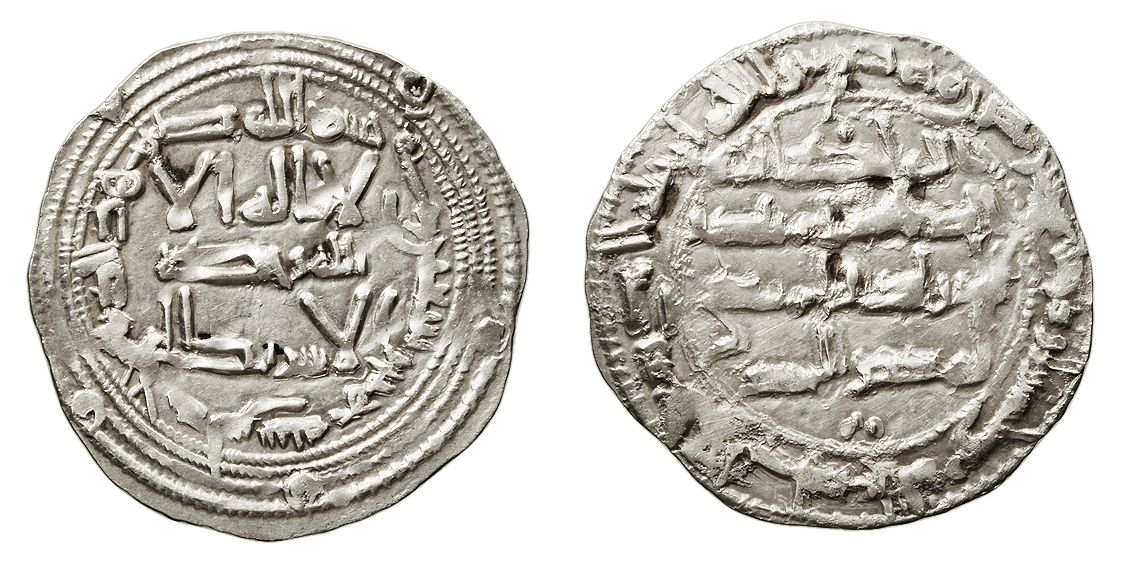
- Dirham of Hisham I of Córdoba

2nd Emir of Córdoba
- Reign: 6 October 788 – 16 April 796
- Predecessor: Abd al-Rahman I
- Successor: al-Hakam I
- Born: April 26, 757; Córdoba
- Died: April 16, 796 (aged 38); Córdoba
- Issue: Al-Hakam I
- Dynasty: Umayyad (Marwanid)
- Father: Abd ar-Rahman I
- Mother: Halul
- Religion: Islam

Hisham I Al-Reda ibn Abd ar-Rahman (Arabic: هشام بن عبد الرحمن الداخل) was the second Emir of Cordoba, ruling from 788 to 796 in al-Andalus.

Hisham was born April 26, 757 in Cordoba. He was the first son of Abd al-Rahman I (r. 756-788) and his wife, Halul, and the younger half brother of Suleiman.

== Domestic rebellions ==
At the beginning of his reign, in 788, he faced rebellions from his brothers, Suleiman and 'Abd Allah. Abd al-Rahman favored his second son, Hisham. By reputation a pious, sober, and capable individual, he came to the throne in 788 at age thirty with considerable experience and the support of the religious elite. However, he was immediately opposed by his elder brother Sulayman, who ruled in Toledo and who quickly recruited another brother, ‘Abd Allah, to his cause. Sulayman was a seasoned fighter who enjoyed the loyalty of the Syrian troops, but after losing Toledo to Hisham and failing to regain the initiative, the two rebellious brothers agreed to accept permanent exile in the Maghrib together with a huge cash settlement.

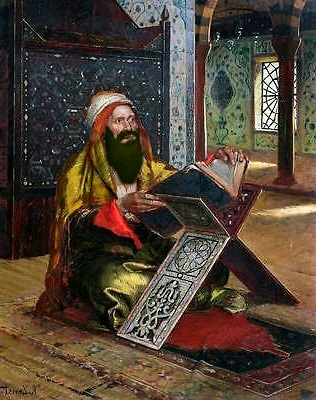
Hisham ibn Abd al-Rahman imaginary portrait

== Reign Of Hisham I ==
Reign of Hisham was one of comparative stability, allowing him the opportunity to reinforce his position at home and reassert the emirate’s power against its neighbors to the north. In terms of domestic policy, Hisham continued his father’s initiatives, completing the mosque of Córdoba and making improvements to the city, including repairing the great Roman bridge, which had partially collapsed over the preceding centuries. He depended heavily on Umayyad family clients to govern and entrenched the emerging Maliki school of ‘ulama’ in the emirate’s power structure They repaid him with gratitude. Malik ibn Anas himself was said to have praised Hisham as an example of piety and justice.

== Expedition to Septimania ==
Faced with Carolingian penetration south across the western and eastern Pyrenees, in 793 he called a jihad against the Christian Franks, sent over troops to Girona and Narbonne, but those strongholds stood firm. The Umayyad general Abd al-Malik ibn Abd al-Wahid ibn Mughith was more fortunate on his approach to Carcassonne, where he defeated Louis the Pious' Carolingian mentor William of Orange. However, surprisingly, the expedition did not advance deeper into Carolingian territory, but resulted in hefty loot and numerous slaves, which in turn provided the funds to expand the Great Mosque of Cordoba and build many mosques.

== Expeditions against Asturians and Basques ==
As of 794, his generals, the above-mentioned Abd al-Malik and his brother Abd al-Karim ibn Abd al-Wahid ibn Mughith, campaigned every year of his reign against the northern principalities, namely Álava, Old Castile, and Asturias, deep into the last's newly established capital city of Oviedo (794). The city in turn was sacked. Alfonso II of Asturias fled, and initiated contacts with Charlemagne. These expeditions didn't aim to destroy the northern Christian principalities, but seem to have been a goal in themselves, raids for the purpose of amassing loot and re-asserting Cordovan military superiority over both restive local Andalusian garrisons and lords prone to detachment, the Kingdom of Asturias, and the Basques.

== Death and assessment ==
Hisham died in 796 C.E. at the age of forty, after a rule of eight years. He was a similar to Umar II, and strove to establish the Islamic way of life, living simply and avoiding ostentation. He was a God-fearing man and was known for his impartial justice and sound administration. After his death, 'Abd Allah returned from exile and claimed Valencia and Suleiman claimed Tangiers against Hisham's son, al-Hakam I.

Hisham was dubbed “the just.”

Hisham was a model of righteousness and a loyal prince. He lived in hopes of salvation and at the time of his succession to the throne, he believed, on the basis of his horoscope, that he had just eight years to live. He, therefore, abandoned all earthly enjoyments and sought redemption through charitable giving. He wore the simplest clothes, he would walk alone through the roads of Cordova, mingle with the ordinary people, visit the sick, enter the dwellings of the poor, and with genuine concern showed interest in all of their needs, requests, and complaints. At night, even in the pouring rain, he would take food from his palace and bring it to the poor. He was prompt in his religious duties, he urged his subjects to follow his example, and on rainy nights would dispense his wealth to those taking part in evening services at the mosques. After eight years, Hisham died as predicted and left to his successor a respectable kingdom.

Hisham I of Córdoba Banu Umayyah Cadet branch of the Banu Quraish
Preceded by Abd al-Rahman I	Emir of Córdoba; 788–796	Succeeded by al-Hakam I
