= Ilyas ibn Habib al-Fihri =

Emir of Ifriqiya in 755

Ilyas ibn Habib al-Fihri (Arabic: إلياس بن حبيب الفهري) (died December 755) was an Arab noble of the Oqbid or Fihrid family, and briefly ruler of Ifriqiya (North Africa) in 755.

Ilyas ibn Habib was a son of the Ifriqiyan military commander Habib ibn Abi Obeida al-Fihri. Ilyas was appointed governor of Tripoli (Tripolitana) by his brother, Abd al-Rahman ibn Habib al-Fihri, not long after the latter seized power in Kairouan in 745.

In 747, Ilyas tried to crack down on the fledgling Ibadites, a puritanical Kharijite sect strong in the cities of Djerba and Tripoli. The Ibadites, inspired by the success of their brethren in Hadramut and Oman, revolted under the leadership of their imam al-Harith, and seized control of much of Tripolitana, between Gabès and Sirte, for themselves. The Fihrids recovered Tripolitana in 752, driving the Ibadites south into the Jebel Nafusa.

After the victory of the Abbasids in the east in 750, many members of the Umayyad clan fled to Ifriqiya, at the invitation of Abd al-Rahman ibn Habib. Ilyas ibn Habib married one of the damsels of the Umayyad clan.

Ilyas continued to serve under his brother, defeating various revolts against Fihrid rule, albeit growing increasingly resentful of the lack of honors that resulted. When Abd al-Rahman designated his own son, Habib as his successor, the rift between the brothers grew.

Around 755, Abd al-Rahman discovered a plot concocted by several exiled Umayyad nobles, and executed the conspirators. Urged on by his vengeful Umayyad wife, Ilyas assassinated his brother Abd al-Rahman ibn Habib in his personal quarters, plunging a dagger into his back while he played with his children.

Ilyas ibn Habib assumed power for himself in Kairouan, with the support of his younger brother Abd al-Wareth ibn Habib and his uncle Muhammad ibn Abi Obeida. To secure his hold, he immediately restored the name of the Abbasid caliph Al-Mansur in the prayers.

But Ilyas's other brother, Amran ibn Habib, then in command of Tunis, refused to recognize the fratricidal coup. Amran gave shelter to Abd al-Rahman's fugitive son, Habib ibn Abd al-Rahman, and together, they waged war against Ilyas and Abd al-Wareth.

The armies met south of Tunis in late 755. But before engaging in battle, an agreement was reached to partition Ifriqiya between the Fihrid family. Amran was to be assigned the government of Tunis and environs, the young Habib the government of southerly Gafsa and Nafzawa, allowing Ilyas to hold on to the remainder of Ifriqiya and overlordship of the Maghreb. The settlement made, Habib proceeded to Kairouan, while Ilyas accompanied Amran back to Tunis. But once in Tunis, Ilyas suddenly turned on his brother and ordered the arrest of Amran and his coterie. Amran was dispatched in chains to al-Andalus, where they would be handed over to Yusuf ibn Abd al-Rahman al-Fihri, governor of al-Andalus.

Returning to Kairouan, Ilyas pressured the young Habib to also leave for al-Andalus. But before the ship could depart, Habib was seized by the partisans of his late father Abd al-Rahman, who promptly proclaimed Habib emir of Ifriqiya and raised an army in his name.

The two armies met in the environs of Laribus. But before battle was enjoined, Habib challenged Ilyas to resolve the quarrel in single combat. At first hesitant, Ilyas finally consented, at the urging of his own commanders. Habib defeated and killed Ilyas, carrying his head as a trophy in a procession back to Kairouan. This took place in December 755.

Hearing of Ilyas's defeat, Abd al-Wareth and remaining partisans of Ilyas fled south and took shelter among the Warfajuma Berbers, from where they would plot their comeback.

== Sources ==
- Ibn Khaldun, Histoire des Berbères et des dynasties musulmanes de l'Afrique, 1852 transl. Algiers.
- Julien, Charles-André, Histoire de l'Afrique du Nord, des origines à 1830, édition originale 1931, réédition Payot, Paris, 1961
- Mercier, E. (1888) Histoire de l'Afrique septentrionale, V. 1, Paris: Leroux. Repr. Elibron Classics, 2005.

== See also ==
- History of early Islamic Tunisia
- History of medieval Tunisia

Preceded by Abd al-Rahman ibn Habib al-Fihri	Governor of Ifriqiya; 755	Succeeded by Habib ibn Abd al-Rahman al-Fihri
