= Abd al-Rahman I =

Emir of Córdoba from 756 to 788

Abd al-Rahman I عبد الرحمن إبن معاوية
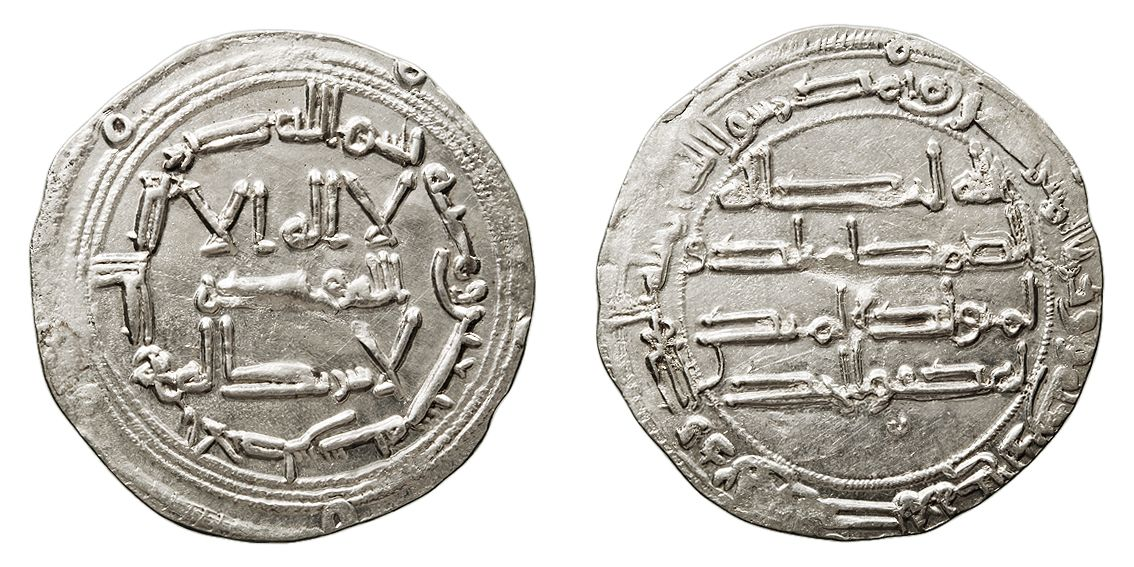
- Dirham coin of Abd al-Rahman I

1st Emir of Córdoba
- Reign: 14 May 756 – 30 September 788
- Predecessor: Yusuf ibn Abd al-Rahman al-Fihri (as governor of al-Andalus)
- Successor: Hisham I
- Born: 7 March 731; Damascus, Umayyad Caliphate (present-day Syria)
- Died: 30 September 788 (aged 57); Qurtuba, Al-Andalus, Emirate of Cordoba (present-day Spain)
- Consort: Several; including Hulal
- Issue: Sulayman; Omar; Hisham I Abdullah
- Dynasty: Umayyad (Marwanid)
- Father: Mu'awiya ibn Hisham
- Mother: Raha
- Religion: Sunni Islam

Abd al-Rahman ibn Mu'awiya (Arabic: عبد الرحمن إبن معاوية, romanized: ʿAbd al-Raḥmān ibn Muʿāwiya; 7 March 731 – 30 September 788), commonly known as Abd al-Rahman I, was the founder and first emir of the Emirate of Córdoba, ruling from 756 to 788. He established the Umayyad dynasty in al-Andalus, which continued for nearly three centuries (including the succeeding Caliphate of Córdoba).

Abd al-Rahman was a member of the Umayyad dynasty in Damascus, and his establishment of a government in Iberia represented a break with the Abbasids, who had overthrown the Umayyads in Damascus in 750. He was also known by the surnames al-Dakhil ("the Immigrant"), Saqr Quraysh ("the Falcon of Quraysh").

== Biography ==
=== Early life and flight from Damascus ===
Abd al-Rahman was born in Palmyra, near Damascus, in the heartland of the Umayyad Caliphate, the son of the Arab Umayyad prince Mu'awiya ibn Hisham and, according to later Andalusi sources, a Berber woman named Rah, who was possibly a concubine from the Nafza tribe. The identity of his mother is not attested in contemporary 8th-century sources, and appears only in later historians such as Ibn Hayyan (d. 1076) and Ibn Idhari (d. 1310).

Abd al-Rahman was the grandson of Hisham ibn Abd al-Malik, who ruled as caliph from 724 to 743. He was twenty when his family, the ruling Umayyads, were overthrown by the Abbasid Revolution in 748–750. Abd al-Rahman and a small part of his family fled Damascus, where the center of Umayyad power had been; people moving with him included his brother Yahya, his four-year-old son Sulayman, and some of his sisters, as well as his Greek mawla (freedman or client), Bedr. The family fled from Damascus to the River Euphrates. All along the way the path was filled with danger, as the Abbasids had dispatched horsemen across the region to try to find the Umayyad prince and kill him. The Abbasids were merciless with all Umayyads that they found. Abbasid agents closed in on Abd al-Rahman and his family while they were hiding in a small village. He left his young son with his sisters and fled with Yahya. Accounts vary, but Bedr likely escaped with Abd al-Rahman. Some histories indicate that Bedr met up with Abd al-Rahman at a later date.

Abd al-Rahman, Yahya, and Bedr quit the village, narrowly escaping the Abbasid assassins. On the way south, Abbasid horsemen again caught up with the trio. Abd al-Rahman and his companions then threw themselves into the River Euphrates. The horsemen urged them to return, promising that no harm would come to them; and Yahya, perhaps from fear of drowning, turned back. The 17th-century historian Ahmed Mohammed al-Maqqari poignantly described Abd al-Rahman's reaction as he implored Yahya to keep going: "O brother! Come to me, come to me!" Yahya returned to the near shore, and was quickly dispatched by the horsemen. They cut off his head and left his body to rot. Al-Maqqari quotes earlier historians reporting that Abd al-Rahman was so overcome with fear that from the far shore he ran until exhaustion overcame him. Only he and Bedr were left to face the unknown.

=== Exile years ===
After barely escaping with their lives, Abd al-Rahman and Bedr continued south through Palestine, the Sinai, and then into Egypt. Abd al-Rahman had to keep a low profile as he traveled. It may be assumed that he intended to go at least as far as northwestern Africa (Maghreb), the land of his mother, which had been partly conquered by his Umayyad predecessors. The journey across Egypt would prove perilous. At the time, Abd al-Rahman ibn Habib al-Fihri was the semi-autonomous governor of Ifriqiya (roughly, modern Tunisia) and a former Umayyad vassal. The ambitious Ibn Habib, a member of the illustrious Fihrid family, had long sought to carve out Ifriqiya as a private dominion for himself. At first, he sought an understanding with the Abbasids, but when they refused his terms and demanded his submission, Ibn Habib broke openly with the Abbasids and invited the remnants of the Umayyad dynasty to take refuge in his dominions. Abd al-Rahman was only one of several surviving Umayyad family members to make their way to Ifriqiya at this time.

But Ibn Habib soon changed his mind. He feared the presence of prominent Umayyad exiles in Ifriqiya, a family more illustrious than his own, might become a focal point for intrigue among local nobles against his own usurped powers. Around 755, believing he had discovered plots involving some of the more prominent Umayyad exiles in Kairouan, Ibn Habib turned against them. At the time, Abd al-Rahman and Bedr were keeping a low profile, staying in Kabylie, at the camp of a Nafza Berber chieftain friendly to their plight. Ibn Habib dispatched spies to look for the Umayyad prince. When Ibn Habib's soldiers entered the camp, the Berber chieftain's wife Tekfah hid Abd al-Rahman under her personal belongings to help him go unnoticed. Once they were gone, Abd al-Rahman and Bedr immediately set off westwards.

In 755, Abd al-Rahman and Bedr reached modern-day Morocco near Ceuta. Their next step would be to cross the sea to al-Andalus, where Abd al-Rahman could not have been sure whether or not he would be welcomed. Following the Berber Revolt of the 740s, the province was in a crisis, with the Muslim community torn by tribal dissensions among the Arabs (the Qays–Yemeni feud) and racial tensions between the Arabs and Berbers. At that moment, the nominal ruler of al-Andalus, emir Yusuf ibn Abd al-Rahman al-Fihri—another member of the Fihrid family and a favorite of the old Arab settlers (baladiyun), mostly of south Arabian or "Yemeni" tribal stock—was locked in a contest with his vizier (and son-in-law) al-Sumayl ibn Hatim al-Kilabi, the head of the "Syrians"—the shamiyun, drawn from the junds or military regiments of Syria, mostly of north Arabian Qaysid tribes—who had arrived in 742.

Among the Syrian junds were contingents of old Umayyad clients, numbering perhaps 500, and Abd al-Rahman believed he might tug on old loyalties and get them to receive him. Bedr was dispatched across the straits to make contact. Bedr managed to line up three Syrian commanders—Ubayd Allah ibn Uthman and Abd Allah ibn Khalid, both originally of Damascus, and Yusuf ibn Bukht of Qinnasrin. The trio approached the Syrian arch-commander al-Sumayl (then in Zaragoza) to get his consent, but al-Sumayl refused, fearing Abd al-Rahman would try to make himself emir. As a result, Bedr and the Umayyad clients sent out feelers to their rivals, the Yemeni commanders. Although the Yemenis were not natural allies (the Umayyads are cousins of the Qaysid tribes), their interest was piqued. The emir Yusuf al-Fihri had proven himself unable to keep the powerful al-Sumayl in check and several Yemeni chieftains felt their future prospects were poor, whether in a Fihrid or Syrian-dominated Spain, so that they had a better chance of advancement if they hitched themselves to the glitter of the Umayyad name. Although the Umayyads did not have a historical presence in the region (no member of the Umayyad family was known to have ever set foot in al-Andalus before) and there were grave concerns about young Abd al-Rahman's inexperience, several of the lower-ranking Yemeni commanders felt they had little to lose and much to gain, and agreed to support the prince.

Bedr returned to Africa to tell Abd al-Rahman of the invitation of the Umayyad clients in al-Andalus. Shortly thereafter, they set off with a small group of followers for Europe. When some local Berber tribesmen learned of Abd al-Rahman's intent to set sail for al-Andalus, they quickly rode to catch up with him on the coast. The tribesmen might have figured that they could hold Abd al-Rahman as hostage, and force him to buy his way out of Africa. He did indeed hand over some amount of dinars to the suddenly hostile local Berbers. Just as Abd al-Rahman launched his boat, another group of Berbers arrived. They also tried to obtain a fee from him for leaving. One of the Berbers held on to Abd al-Rahman's vessel as it made for al-Andalus, and allegedly had his hand cut off by one of the boat's crew.

Abd al-Rahman landed at Almuñécar in al-Andalus, to the east of Málaga, in September 755; however, his landing site was unconfirmed.

=== Fight for power ===
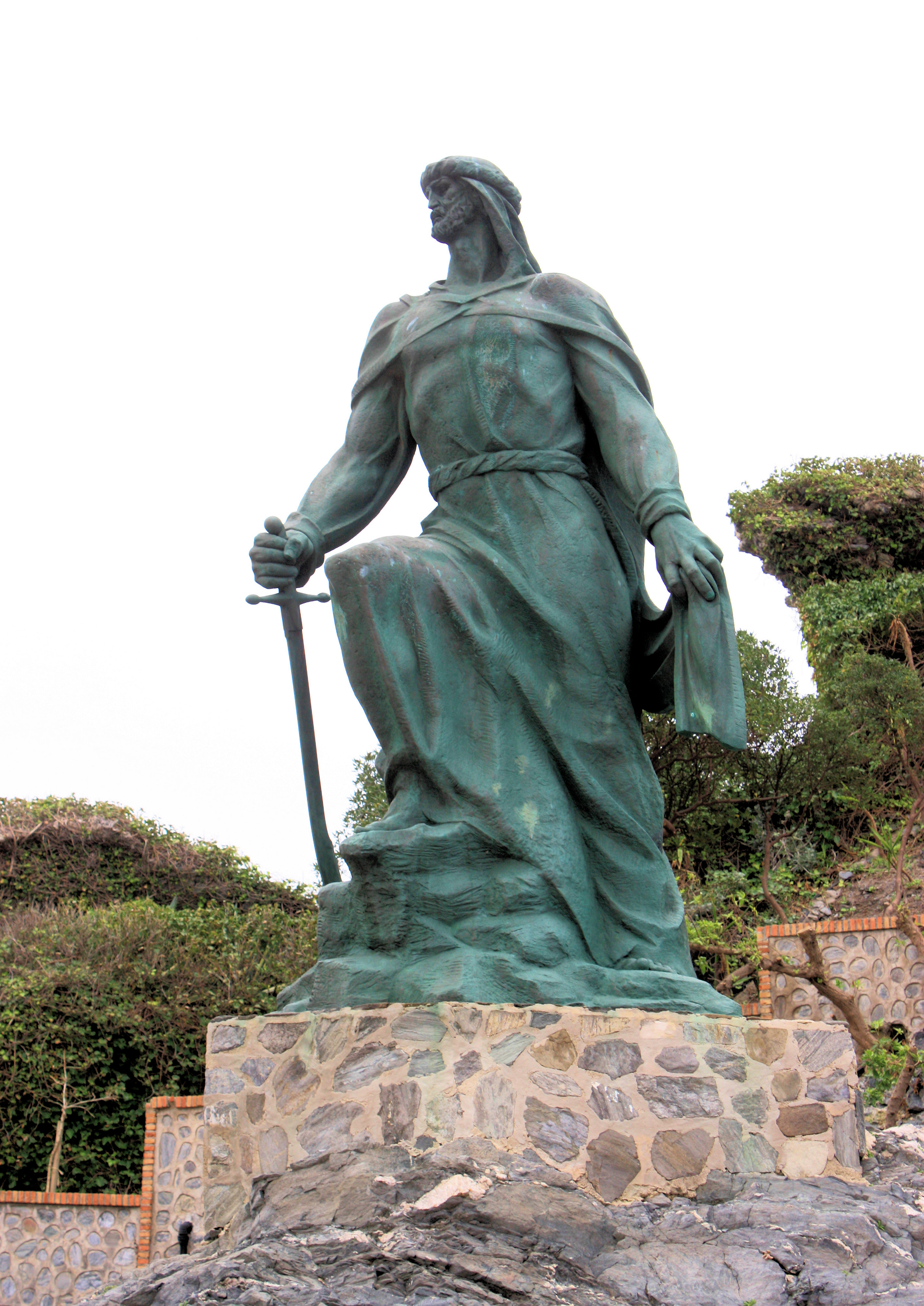
Modern statue of Abd al-Rahman at Almuñécar

Upon landing in Torrox, al-Andalus, Abd al-Rahman was greeted by clients Abu Uthman and Ibn Khalid and an escort of 300 cavalry. During his brief time in Málaga, he was able to amass local support quickly. Waves of people made their way to Málaga to pay respect to the prince they thought was dead, including many of the aforementioned Syrians. One famous story that persisted through history related to a gift Abd al-Rahman was given while in Málaga. The gift was a beautiful young slave girl, but Abd al-Rahman humbly returned her to her previous master.

News of the prince's arrival spread throughout the peninsula. During this time, emir al-Fihri and the Syrian commander al-Sumayl pondered what to do about the new threat to their shaky hold on power. They decided to try to marry Abd al-Rahman into their family. If that did not work, then Abd al-Rahman would have to be killed. Abd al-Rahman was apparently sagacious enough to expect such a plot. In order to help speed his ascension to power, he was prepared to take advantage of the feuds and dissensions. However, before anything could be done, trouble broke out in northern al-Andalus. Zaragoza, an important trade city on the Upper March of al-Andalus, made a bid for autonomy. Al-Fihri and al-Sumayl rode north to quash the rebellion. This might have been fortunate timing for Abd al-Rahman, since he was still getting a solid foothold in al-Andalus. By March 756, Abd al-Rahman and his growing following of Umayyad clients and Yemeni junds, were able to take Sevilla without violence. He managed to break the rebellion attempt in Zaragoza, but just about that time the Cordovan governor received news of a Basque rebellion in Pamplona. An important detachment was sent by Yusuf ibn 'Abd al-Rahman to quash it, but his troops were annihilated. After the setback, al-Fihri turned his army back south to face the "pretender". The fight for the right to rule al-Andalus was about to begin. The two contingents met on opposite sides of the River Guadalquivir, just outside the capital of Córdoba on the plains of al-Musarah. There the decisive battle of al-Musarah or Alameda between the two contingents took place.

The river was, for the first time in years, overflowing its banks, heralding the end of a long drought. Nevertheless, food was still scarce, and Abd al-Rahman's army suffered from hunger. In an attempt to demoralize Abd al-Rahman's troops, al-Fihri ensured that his troops not only were well fed, but also ate gluttonous amounts of food in full view of the Umayyad lines. An attempt at negotiations soon followed in which it is likely that Abd al-Rahman was offered the hand of al-Fihri's daughter in marriage and great wealth. Abd al-Rahman, however, would settle for nothing less than control of the emirate, and an impasse was reached. Even before the fight began, dissension spread through some of Abd al-Rahman's lines. Specifically, the Yemeni Arabs were unhappy that the prince was mounted on a fine Spanish steed and that his mettle was untried in battle. The Yemenis observed significantly that such a fine horse would provide an excellent mount to escape from battle.

Being the ever-wary politician, Abd al-Rahman acted quickly to regain Yemeni support, and rode to a Yemeni chief who was mounted on a mule named "Lightning". Abd al-Rahman averred that his horse proved difficult to ride and was wont to buck him out of the saddle. He offered to exchange his horse for the mule, a deal to which the surprised chief readily agreed. The swap quelled the simmering Yemeni rebellion. Soon both armies were in their lines on the same bank of the Guadalquivir. Abd al-Rahman had no banner, and so one was improvised by unwinding a green turban and binding it round the head of a spear. Subsequently, the turban and the spear became the banner and symbol of the Andalusian Umayyads. Abd al-Rahman led the charge toward al-Fihri's army. Al-Sumayl in turn advanced his cavalry out to meet the Umayyad threat. After a long and difficult fight "Abd ar-Rahman obtained a most complete victory, and the field was strewn with the bodies of the enemy.". Both al-Fihri and al-Sumayl managed to escape the field (probably) with parts of the army too. Abd al-Rahman triumphantly marched into the capital, Córdoba. Danger was not far behind, as al-Fihri planned a counterattack. He reorganized his forces and set out for the capital Abd al-Rahman had usurped from him. Again Abd al-Rahman met al-Fihri with his army; this time negotiations were successful, although the terms were somewhat changed. In exchange for al-Fihri's life and wealth, he would be a prisoner and not allowed to leave the city limits of Córdoba. Al-Fihri would have to report once a day to Abd al-Rahman, as well as turn over some of his sons and daughters as hostages. For a while al-Fihri met the obligations of the one-sided truce, but he still had many people loyal to him—people who would have liked to see him back in power.

Al-Fihri eventually did make another bid for power. He quit Córdoba and quickly started gathering supporters. While at large, al-Fihri managed to gather an army allegedly numbering 20,000. It is doubtful, however, that his troops were "regular" soldiers, but rather a hodge-podge of men from various parts of al-Andalus. Abd al-Rahman's appointed governor in Sevilla took up the chase, and after a series of small fights, managed to defeat al-Fihri's army. Al-Fihri himself managed to escape to the former Visigoth capital of Toledo in central al-Andalus; once there, he was promptly killed. Al-Fihri's head was sent to Córdoba, where Abd al-Rahman had it nailed to a bridge. With this act, Abd al-Rahman proclaimed himself the emir of al-Andalus. However, in order to take over southern Iberia, al-Fihri's general, al-Sumayl, had to be dealt with, and he was garroted in Córdoba's jail. Still, most of central and northern al-Andalus (Toledo, Zaragoza, Barcelona, etc.) was out of his rule, with large swathes remaining in the hands of Yusuf ibn 'Abd al-Rahman al-Fihri's supporters until 779 (submission of Zaragoza).

=== Rule ===
It is unclear whether Abd al-Rahman proclaimed himself caliph. There are documents in the archives of Cordoba that state that this was his first act upon entering the city. However, historically he is recorded as Emir and not Caliph. Abd al-Rahman's 7th descendant, Abd al-Rahman III, would, however, take up the title of caliph. In the meantime, a call went out through the Muslim world that al-Andalus was a safe haven for friends of the house of Umayya, if not for Abd al-Rahman's scattered family that managed to evade the Abbasids. Abd al-Rahman probably was quite happy to see his call answered by waves of Umayyad faithful and family. He was finally reacquainted with his son Sulayman, whom he last saw weeping on the banks of the Euphrates with his sisters. Abd al-Rahman's sisters were unable to make the long voyage to al-Andalus. Abd al-Rahman placed his family members in high offices across the land, as he felt he could trust them more than non-family. The Umayyad family would again grow large and prosperous over successive generations. One of these kinsmen, Abd al-Malik ibn Umar ibn Marwan, persuaded Abd al-Rahman in 757 to drop the name of the Abbasid caliph from the Friday prayers (a traditional recognition of sovereignty in medieval Islam), and became one of his top generals and his governor in Seville.

By 763 Abd al-Rahman had to get back to the business of war. Al-Andalus had been invaded by an Abbasid army. Far away in Baghdad, the current Abbasid caliph, al-Mansur, had long been planning to depose the Umayyad who dared to call himself emir of al-Andalus. Al-Mansur installed al-Ala ibn-Mugith as governor of Africa (whose title gave him dominion over the province of al-Andalus). It was al-Ala who headed the Abbasid army that landed in al-Andalus, possibly near Beja (in modern-day Portugal). Much of the surrounding area of Beja capitulated to al-Ala, and in fact rallied under the Abbasid banners against Abd al-Rahman. Abd al-Rahman had to act quickly. The Abbasid contingent was vastly superior in size, said to have numbered 7,000 men. The emir quickly made for the redoubt of Carmona with his army. The Abbasid army was fast on their heels, and laid siege to Carmona for approximately two months. Abd al-Rahman must have sensed that time was against him as food and water became scarce, and his troops morale likely came into question. Finally Abd al-Rahman gathered his men as he was "resolved on an audacious sally". Abd al-Rahman hand-picked 700 fighters from his army and led them to Carmona's main gate. There, he started a great fire and threw his scabbard into the flames. Abd al-Rahman told his men that time had come to go down fighting rather than die of hunger. The gate lifted and Abd al-Rahman's men fell upon the unsuspecting Abbasids, thoroughly routing them. Most of the Abbasid army was killed. The heads of the main Abbasid leaders were cut off, preserved in salt, identifying tags pinned to their ears, and then bundled together in a gruesome package and sent to the Abbasid caliph, who was on pilgrimage at Mecca. Upon receiving the evidence of al-Ala's defeat in al-Andalus, al-Mansur is said to have gasped, "God be praised for placing a sea between us!" Al-Mansur hated, and yet apparently respected Abd al-Rahman to such a degree that he dubbed him the "Hawk of Quraysh" (the Umayyads were from a branch of the Quraysh tribe).

Despite such a tremendous victory, Abd al-Rahman had to continuously put down rebellions in al-Andalus. Various Arab and Berber tribes fought each other for varying degrees of power, some cities tried to break away and form their own state, and even members of Abd al-Rahman's family tried to wrest power from him. During a large revolt, dissidents marched on Córdoba itself; However, Abd al-Rahman always managed to stay one step ahead, and crushed all opposition; as he always dealt severely with dissidents in al-Andalus.

=== Problems in the Upper March ===
Zaragoza proved to be a most difficult city to reign over for not only Abd al-Rahman, but his successors as well. In the year 777–778, several notable men including Sulayman ibn Yokdan al-Arabi al-Kelbi, the self-appointed governor of Zaragoza, met with delegates of the leader of the Franks, Charlemagne. "[Charlemagne's] army was enlisted to help the Muslim governors of Barcelona and Zaragoza against the Umayyad [emir] in Cordoba...." Essentially Charlemagne was being hired as a mercenary, even though he likely had other plans of acquiring the area for his own empire. After Charlemagne's columns arrived at the gates of Zaragoza, Sulayman got cold feet and refused to let the Franks into the city, after his subordinate, al-Husayn ibn Yahiya, had successfully defeated and captured Abd al-Rahman's most trusted general, Thalaba Ibn Ubayd. It is possible that he realized that Charlemagne would want to usurp power from him. After capturing Sulayman, Charlemagne's force eventually headed back to France via a narrow pass in the Pyrenees, where his rearguard was wiped out by Basque and Gascon rebels (this disaster inspired the epic Chanson de Roland). Charlemagne was also attacked by Sulayman's relatives, who had freed Sulayman.

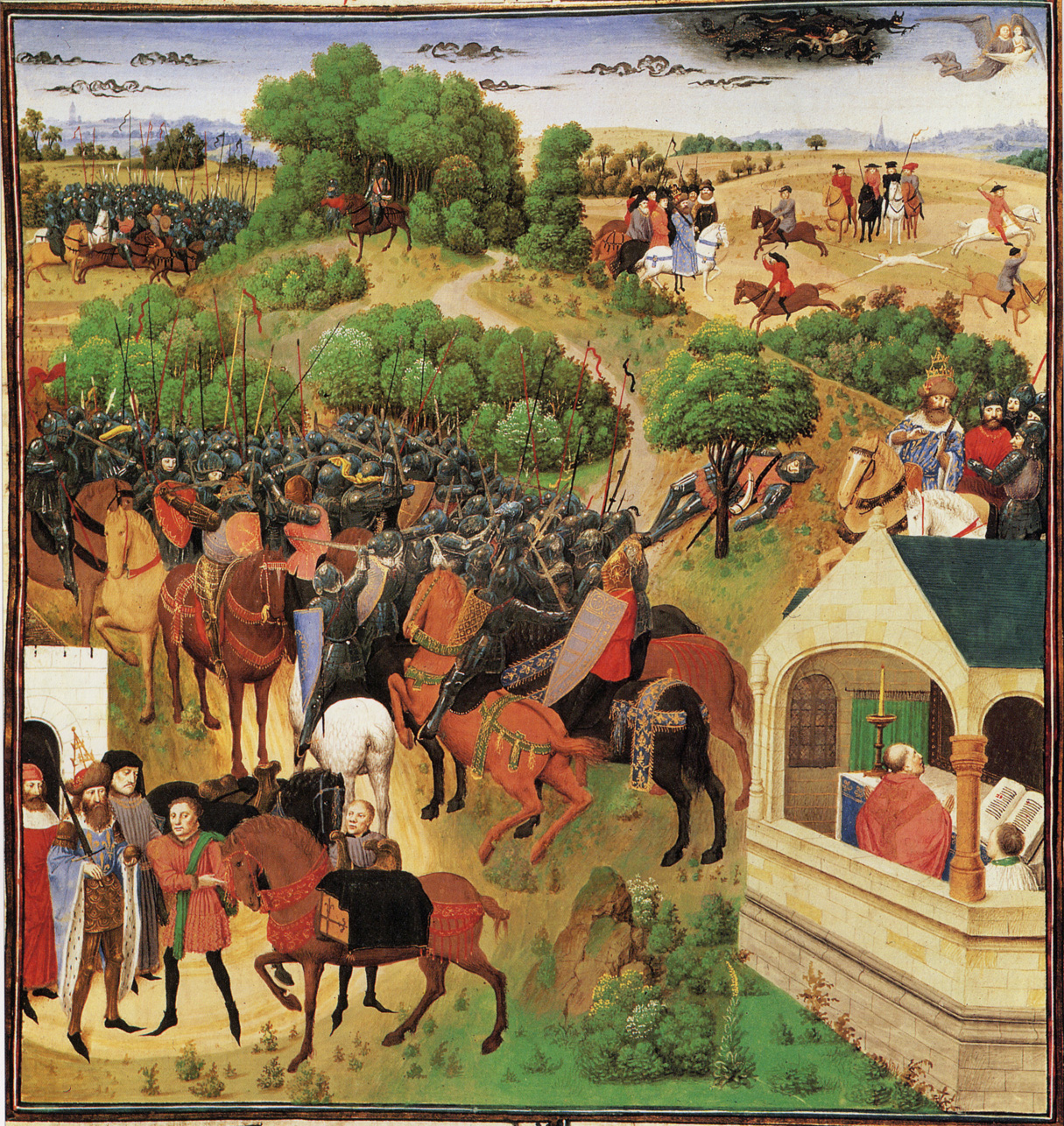
An illustration of The Song of Roland from the Grandes Chroniques de France, A romanticization of Battle of Roncevaux Pass.

Now Abd al-Rahman could deal with Sulayman and the city of Zaragoza without having to fight a massive Christian army. In 779 Abd al-Rahman offered Husayn, one of Sulayman's allies, the job of Zaragoza's governorship. The temptation was too much for al-Husayn, who murdered his colleague Sulayman. As promised, al-Husayn was awarded Zaragoza with the expectation that he would always be a subordinate of Córdoba. However, within two years al-Husayn broke off relations with Abd al-Rahman and announced that Zaragoza would be an independent city-state. Once again Abd al-Rahman had to be concerned with developments in the Upper March. He was intent on keeping this important northern border city within the Umayyad fold. By 783 Abd al-Rahman's army advanced on Zaragoza. It appeared as though Abd al-Rahman wanted to make clear to this troublesome city that independence was out of the question. Included in the arsenal of Abd al-Rahman's army were thirty-six siege engines. Zaragoza's famous white granite defensive walls were breached under a torrent of ordnance from the Umayyad lines. Abd al-Rahman's warriors spilled into the city's streets, quickly thwarting al-Husayn's desires for independence.

== Legacy and death ==
=== Construction works ===
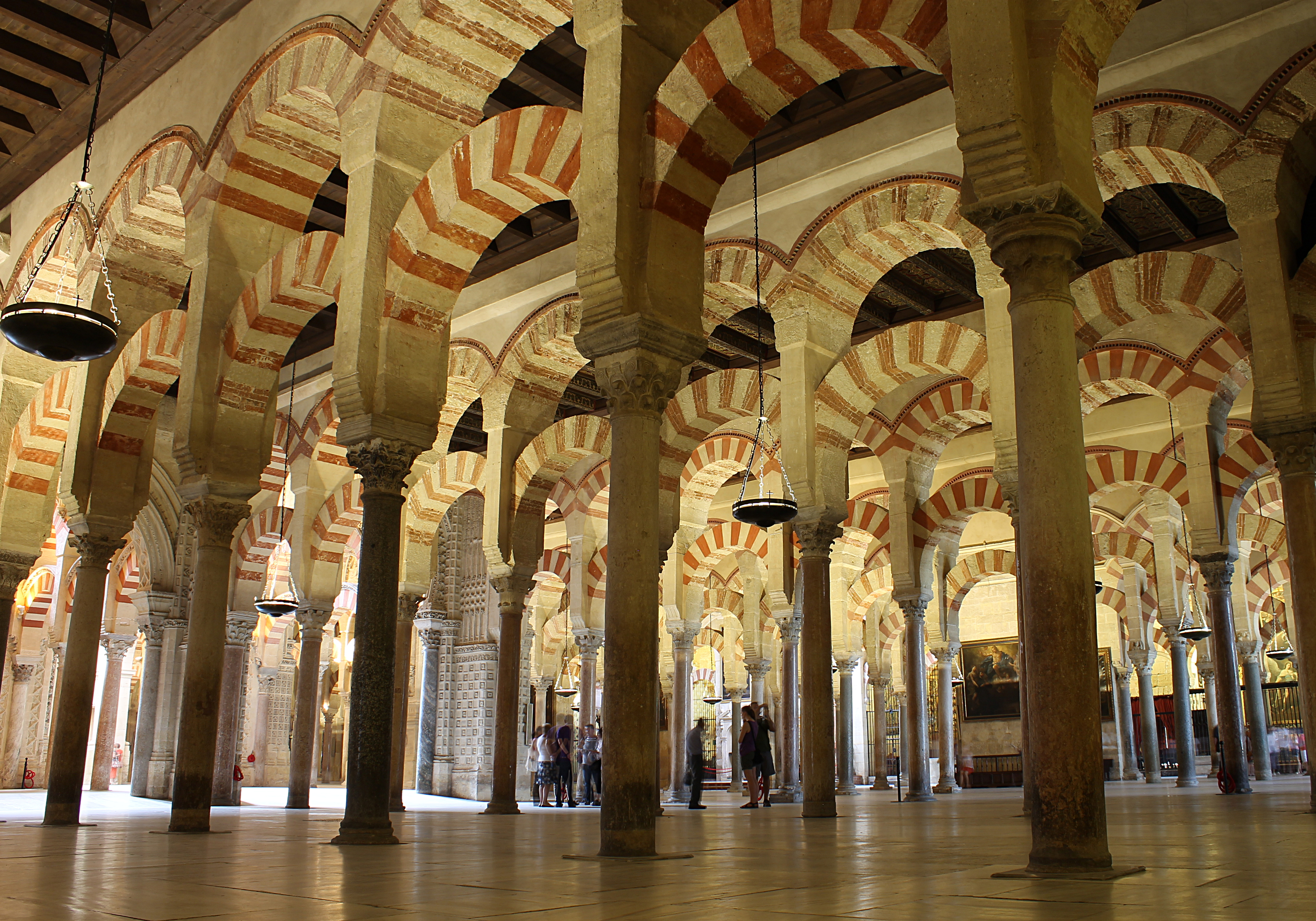
The hypostyle hall, with its distinctive two-tiered arches, inside the Great Mosque of Córdoba, begun by Abd al Rahman I in 785–786.

Abd al-Rahman did much work to improve al-Andalus' infrastructure. He also built the world-famous Great Mosque of Córdoba (the present-day cathedral of Córdoba), which took place from 785 to 786 (169 AH) to 786–787 (170 AH). It was expanded multiple times by his successors up to the 10th century.

=== Social dynamics ===
Abd al-Rahman knew that one of his sons would one day inherit the rule of al-Andalus, but that it was a land torn by strife. In order to successfully rule in such a situation, Abd al-Rahman needed to create a reliable civil service and organize a standing army. He felt that he could not always rely on the local populace in providing a loyal army; and therefore bought a massive standing army consisting mainly of Berbers from North Africa as well as slaves from other areas.

As was common during the early years of Islamic expansion from Arabia, religious tolerance was practiced. Abd al-Rahman continued to allow Jews and Christians and other monotheistic religions to retain and practice their faiths, in exchange for the jizya. Possibly because of tribute taxes, "the bulk of the country's population must have become Muslim". However, other scholars have argued that though 80% of al-Andalus converted to Islam, it did not truly occur until near the 10th century.

Christians more often converted to Islam than Jews although there were converted Jews among the new followers of Islam. There was a great deal of freedom of interaction among the groups: for example, Sarah, the granddaughter of the Visigoth king Wittiza, married a Muslim man and bore two sons who were later counted among the ranks of the highest Arab nobility.

=== Death ===
Abd al-Rahman died c. 788 in Córdoba, and was supposedly buried under the site of the Mezquita. Abd al-Rahman's alleged favorite son was his choice for successor, and would later be known as Hisham I. Abd al-Rahman's progeny would continue to rule al-Andalus in the name of the house of Umayya for several generations, with the zenith of their power coming during the reign of Abd al-Rahman III.

Abd al-Rahman I was able to forge a new Umayyad dynasty by standing successfully against Charlemagne, the Abbasids, the Berbers, and other Muslim Spaniards. His legacy started a new chapter for the Umayyad Dynasty ensuring their survival and culminating in the new Umayyad Caliphate of Cordoba by his descendants.

== Family ==
Abd al-Rahman was the son of Mu'awiya, son of Hisham, son of Abd al-Malik, according to Abd el-Wahid Merrakechi when reciting his ancestry. Abd al-Rahman's mother was a member of the Nafza Berbers with whom he found refuge after the murder of his family in 750.

Abd al-Rahman conceived Hisham with a Spanish slave named Hulal. She was first presented to him by Yusuf's daughter in Yusuf's palace, following Abd al-Rahman's defeat of Yusuf in Córdoba. She is said to have been very beautiful. Abd al-Rahman was the father of several other sons, but the identity of their mother(s) is not clear:

- Sulayman (745–800), Governor of Toledo. Exiled after he refused to accept his brother Hisham's rule. Returned to challenge his nephew in 796, captured and executed in 800.
- Omar (died before 758), captured in battle and executed by Fruela I of Asturias.
- Hisham I (757–17 Apr 796), Emir of Cordoba.
- Abdallah

== Legends ==
In his lifetime, Abd al-Rahman was known as al Dakhil ("the Entrant"), but he was also known as Saqr Quraish ("The Falcon of the Quraish"), bestowed on him by one of his greatest enemies, the Abbasid caliph al-Mansur.

According to the chroniclers, al-Mansur once asked his courtiers who deserved the exalted title of "Falcon of the Quraysh" (Saqr Quraish, foremost of the Quraysh). The obsequious courtiers naturally replied "You, O Commander of the Faithful!", but the Caliph denied this. Then they suggested Mu'awiya (founder of the Umayyad Caliphate), but the Caliph again denied it. Then they suggested Abd al-Malik ibn Marwan (one of the greatest of the Umayyad caliphs), but again no. They asked who it was, and al-Mansur replied:

The falcon of Quraysh is Abd al-Rahman, who escaped by his cunning the spearheads of the lances and the blades of the swords, who after wandering solitary through the deserts of Asia and Africa, had the boldness to seek his fortune without an army, in lands unknown to him beyond the sea. Having naught to rely upon save his own wits and perseverance, he nonetheless humiliated his proud foes, exterminated rebels, organized cities, mobilized armies, secured his frontiers against the Christians, founded a great empire and reunited under his scepter a realm that seemed already parcelled out among others. No man before him ever did such deeds. Mu'awiya rose to his stature through the support of Umar and Uthman, whose backing allowed him to overcome difficulties; Abd al-Malik, because of previous appointment; and the Commander of the Faithful [i.e. al-Mansur himself] through the struggle of his kin and the solidarity of his partisans. But Abd al-Rahman did it alone, with the support of none other than his own judgment, depending on no one but his own resolve.

== See also ==
- Timeline of the Muslim presence in the Iberian peninsula
- Abbasid Revolution
- al-Andalus
- Caliphate of Córdoba
- Abd al-Malik ibn Umar
- Sara al-Qutiyya

== Bibliography ==
- Lévi-Provençal, Évariste (1960). "ʿAbd al- Raḥmān". In Gibb, H. A. R.; Kramers, J. H.; Lévi-Provençal, E.; Schacht, J.; Lewis, B. & Pellat, Ch. (eds.). The Encyclopaedia of Islam, Second Edition. Volume I: A–B. Leiden: E. J. Brill. pp. 81–82. OCLC 495469456.

Abd al-Rahman I Banu Umayyah Cadet branch of the Banu Quraish Born: 730 Died: 788
Preceded by Yusuf ibn 'Abd al-Rahman al-Fihri as Governor of Al-Andalus	Emir of Córdoba; 756–788	Succeeded by Hisham I
