= Navafría =

- Municipality
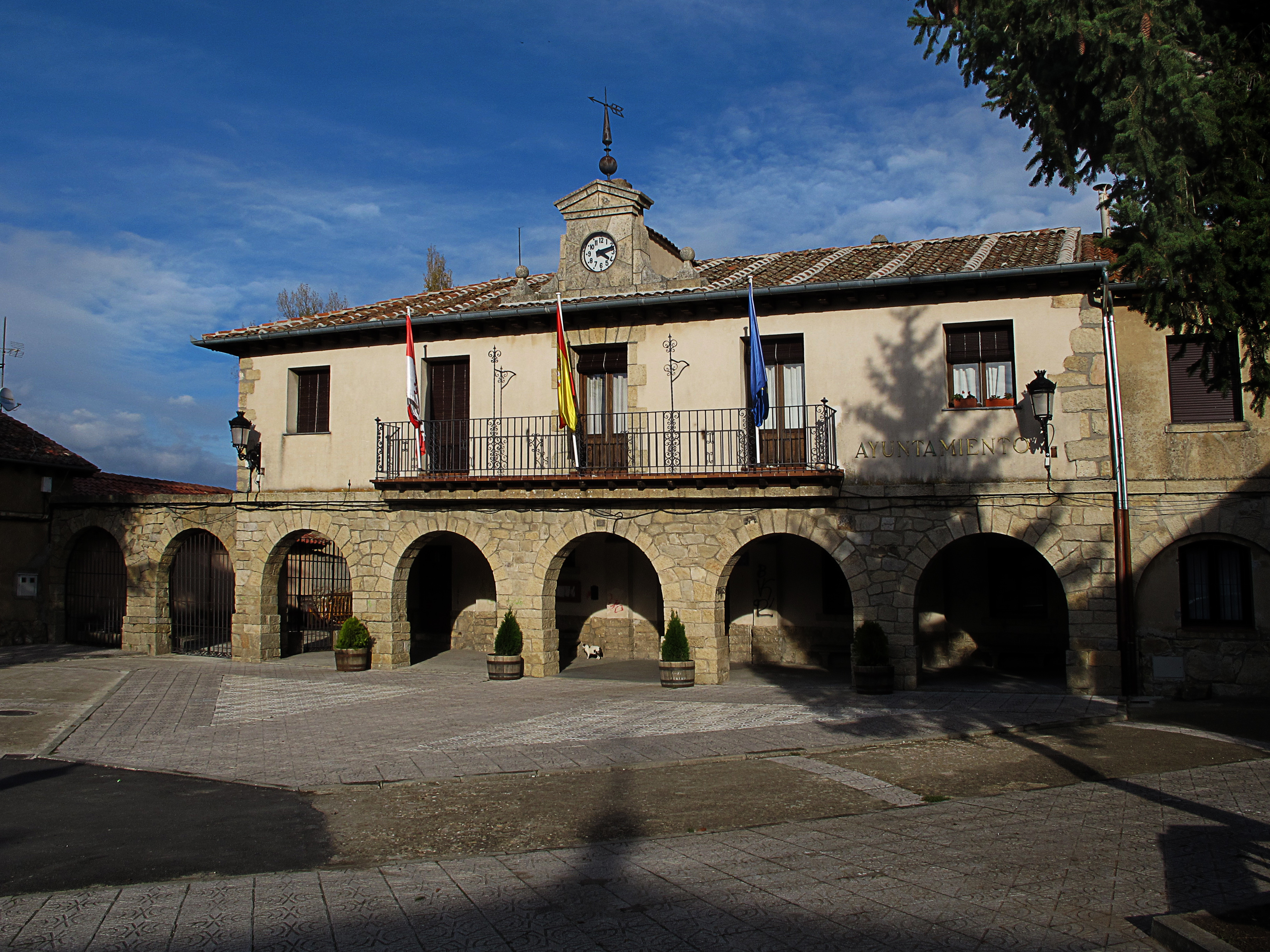

- Flag Coat of arms

- Location in Spain. Navafría (Spain)
- Coordinates: 41°03′17″N 3°49′21″W
- Country: Spain
- Autonomous community: Castile and León
- Province: Segovia
- Municipality: Navafría

Area
  - Total: 30 km^{2} (12 sq mi)

Population (2025-01-01)
  - Total: 282
  - Density: 9.4/km^{2} (24/sq mi)
- Time zone: UTC+1 (CET)
  - Summer (DST): UTC+2 (CEST)
- Website: Official website

Navafría is a municipality located in the province of Segovia, Castile and León, Spain. According to the 2008 census (INE), the municipality has a population of 370 inhabitants.

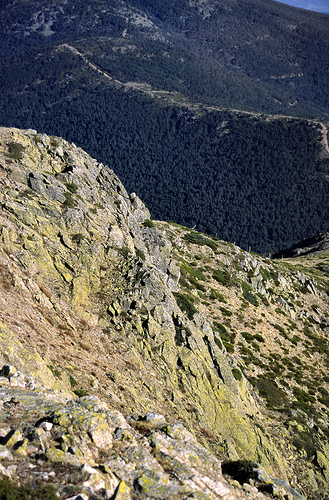
Landscape of the port of Navafría.

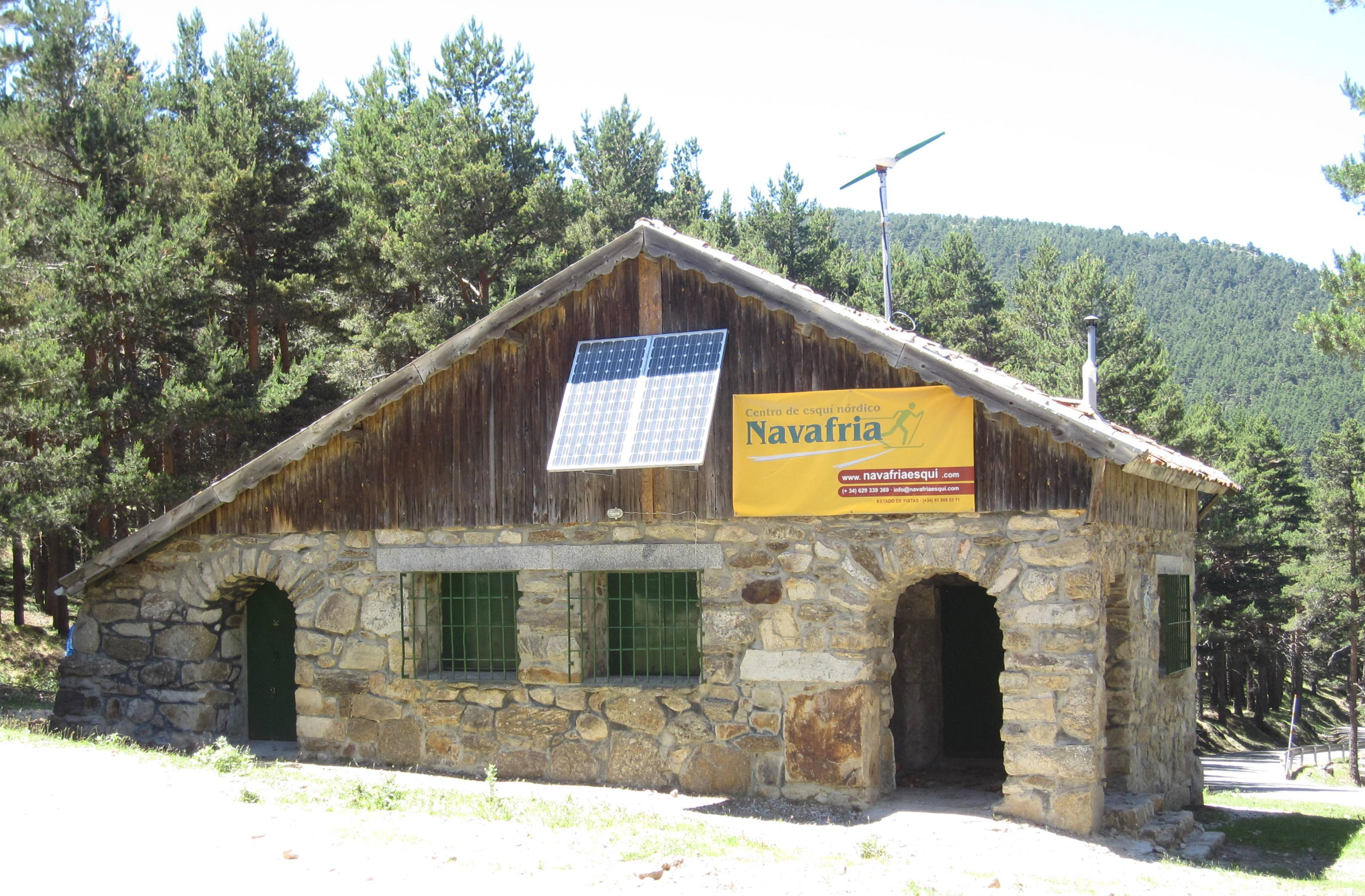
Mountain house in the port of Navafría.
