= Fihrids =

8th-century Arab ruling family in Ifriqiya and Al-Andalus

Fihrids الفهريون
- Parent family: Quraysh
- Country: Ifriqiya (745–757); Al-Andalus (747–756)
- Place of origin: Mecca, Arabia
- Founded: 745
- Founder: Abd al-Rahman ibn Habib
- Final ruler: Habib ibn Abd al-Rahman
- Seat: Al-Qayrawan, Ifriqiya; Qurtubah, Al-Andalus
- Titles: Emir of Ifriqiya; Wali of Ifriqiya; Wali of al-Andalus; Wali of Tunis; Wali of Tripoli; Wali of Gabes
- Dissolution: 757

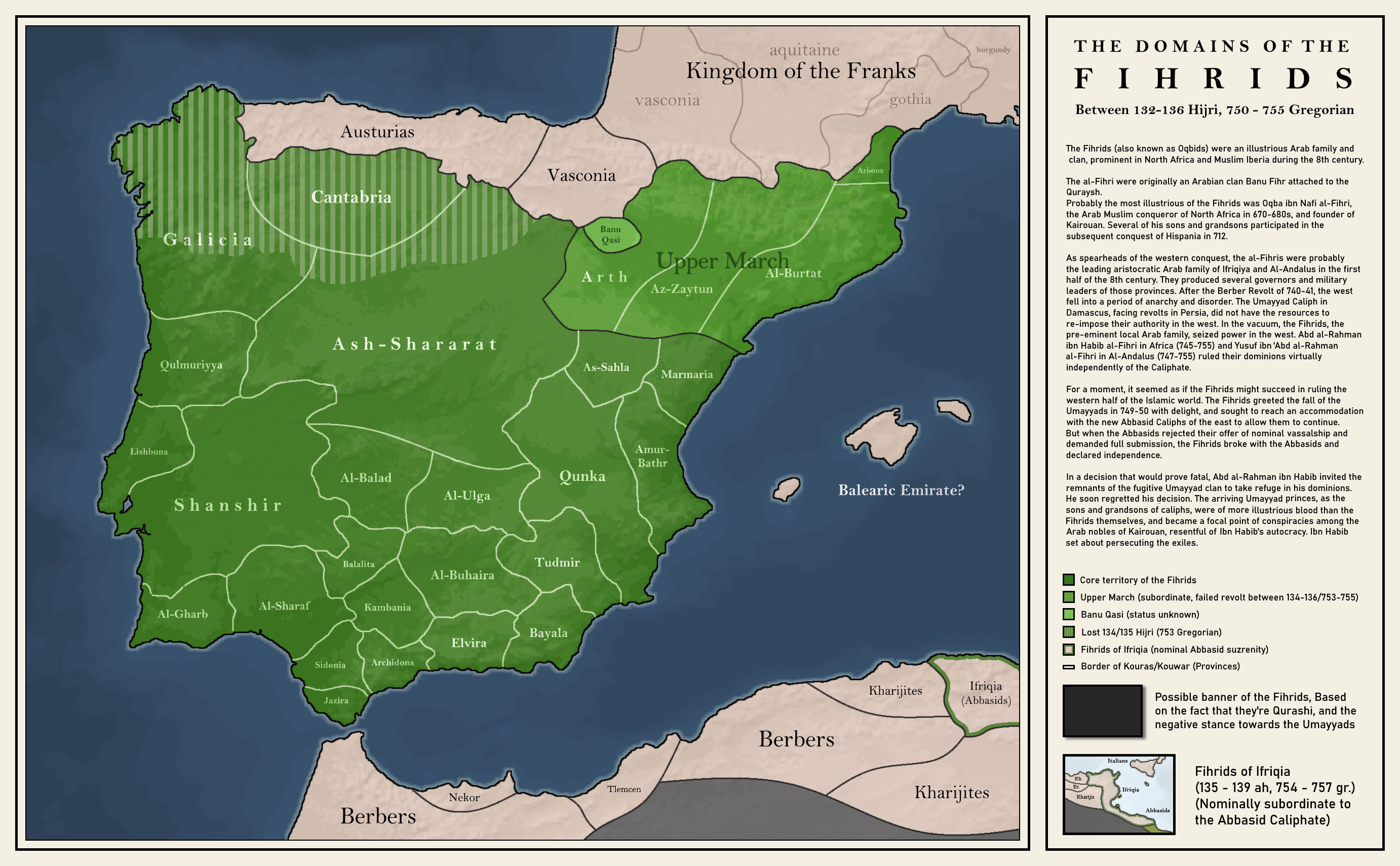

The Fihrids (Arabic: الفهريون, romanized: al-Fihriyyūn), also known as Banū Fihr (Arabic: بنو فهر), were an Arab family and clan, prominent in Ifriqiya and Al-Andalus in the 8th century.

The Fihrids were from the Arabian clan of Banu Fihr, part of the Quraysh, the tribe of the Prophet. Probably the most illustrious of the Fihrids was Uqba ibn Nafi al-Fihri, the Arab Muslim conqueror of North Africa in 670-680s, and founder of al-Qayrawan. Several of his sons and grandsons participated in the subsequent conquest of Hispania in 712.

As spearheads of the western conquest, the al-Fihris were probably the leading aristocratic Arab family of Ifriqiya and Al-Andalus in the first half of the 8th century. They produced several governors and military leaders of those provinces. After the Berber Revolt of 740-41, the west fell into a period of anarchy and disorder. The Umayyad Caliph in Damascus, facing revolts in Persia, did not have the resources to re-impose their authority in the west. In the vacuum, the Fihrids, the pre-eminent local Arab family, seized power in the west. Abd al-Rahman ibn Habib al-Fihri in Ifriqiya (745–755) and Yusuf ibn 'Abd al-Rahman al-Fihri in Al-Andalus (747–756) ruled their dominions virtually independently of the Caliphate.

For a moment, it seemed as if the Fihrids might succeed in turning the western half of the Islamic world into a private family empire. The Fihrids greeted the fall of the Umayyads in 749-50 with delight, and sought to reach an accommodation with the new Abbasid Caliphs of the east to allow them to continue. But when the Abbasids rejected their offer of nominal vassalship and demanded full submission, the Fihrids broke with the Abbasids and declared independence.

In a decision that would prove fatal, Abd al-Rahman ibn Habib invited the remnants of the fugitive Umayyad clan to take refuge in his dominions. He soon regretted his decision. The arriving Umayyad princes, as the sons and grandsons of caliphs, were of more noble blood than the Fihrids themselves, and became a focal point of conspiracies among the Arab nobles of al-Qayrawan, resentful of Ibn Habib's autocracy. Ibn Habib set about persecuting the exiles. One of them, the young Abd al-Rahman, would flee to Al-Andalus, depose the Fihrids there and erect the Umayyad Emirate of Qurtubah in 756.

While the Andalusi branch was eclipsed by the Umayyads, the Ifriqiyan branch of the Fihrids descended into a bloody family quarrel in 755, that threw Ifriqiya into chaos, and ended with them being overrun and extinguished in a Kharijite Berber uprising in 757–758.

The al-Fihri name continued to have a magical effect in Al-Andalus, and pretenders drawn from that family continued to challenge Umayyad rule until the end of the century. The descendants of this family are found in Fez, Morocco under the name of al-Fassi al-Fihri, and some are found in Tunisia.

The genealogy of the Fihrids:

- Nafi al-Fihri
  - Uqba ibn Nafi al-Fihri, founder of al-Qayrawan, conqueror of the Maghreb, emir of Ifriqiya (666-674, 681-683)
    - Abu Ubayda ibn Uqba al-Fihri, participated in conquest of Hispania, 712.
      - Habib ibn Abi Ubayda al-Fihri, conqueror of Sous, military commander of Ifriqiyan army, fell at Bagdoura in 741.
        - Abd al-Rahman ibn Habib, emir of Ifriqiya (745-755)
          - Habib ibn Abd al-Rahman, wali of Cyrenaica, killed his uncles Muhammad and Ilyas in combat, emir of Ifriqiya (755-57)
            - Abd al-Rahman ibn Habib, 'al-Siqlabi', united with Berber rebel Abu Hatim, led Iberian revolt in 778-779.
          - Yusuf ibn 'Abd al-Rahman al-Fihri, emir of Al-Andalus (747-756), wali of Toledo (756-759)
            - Muhammad ibn Yusuf al-Fihri, led Iberian revolt in 785.
            - Abd al-Rahman ibn Yusuf al-Fihri, governor of Zaragoza in 740s.
            - al-Qasim ibn Yusuf
        - Ilyas ibn Habib, murdered his brother Abd al-Rahman, wali of Tripolitana, emir of Ifriqiya (755-56)
        - Abd al-Warith ibn Habib, complicit in murder of Abd al-Rahman
        - Imran ibn Habib, opposed to murder of Abd al-Rahman, joined with Habib ibn Abd al-Rahman, Wali of Tunis.
      - Khalid ibn Abi Habib, fell at Battle of the Nobles in 740.
      - Muhammad ibn Abi Ubayda, may have been complicit in murder of Abd al-Rahman, killed in conflict with Habib ibn Abd al-Rahman.
      - Uthman ibn Abi Ubayda.
        - Shuaib ibn Uthman, wali of Gabes.
