= Æthelberht of East Anglia =

Æthelberht may refer to:

- Æthelberht I of East Anglia, floruit circa 749
- Æthelberht II of East Anglia (died 794), Saint Æthelberht
