= Æthelred of East Anglia =

Æethelred of East Anglia may refer to:

- Æthelred I of East Anglia fl. c760s-780s
- Æthelred II of East Anglia fl. c 875
