= Saint Ethelbert the King =

Saint Ethelbert the King can refer to one of two different canonized kings of that name:

- Æthelberht II of East Anglia d. 20 May 794. Martyred.
- Æthelberht of Kent c. 550 – 24 February 616. Anglo-Saxon king converted to Christianity by Augustine of Canterbury.
