= Marcelle Campana =

French diplomat posted to Toronto; first consul general of France posted anywhere

- Born: Marcelle Andrée Campana; April 10, 1913; 7th arrondissement of Paris, France
- Died: June 5, 2010 (aged 97); Erbalunga, Haute-Corse, France
- Occupation: Diplomat

Marcelle Andrée Campana (10 April 1913 – 5 June 2010) was a French diplomat. She was the first French woman to be a consul general or ambassador.

== Biography ==
Campana was the daughter of a French diplomat who was consul general in London and in Sydney. She graduated from Sciences Po and joined the French Ministry of Foreign Affairs in 1935.

During World War II, Campana worked as an archivist and participated in the French Resistance as part of the Fighting French Forces.

After the Liberation, she was able to pursue a diplomatic career.

Later in her career, Campana was appointed as ambassador to Panama in 1967 and consul general in Toronto in 1972, serving until 1975. She was the first woman in France to hold these positions. She subsequently was Consul General in Monaco.

She died on 5 June 2010 in Erbalunga, Haute-Corse.

== Decorations ==
- Legion of Honour – Officer
- Ordre national du Mérite – Officer
- Order of Saint Charles – Commander (1977) 1977

== Sources ==
- Denéchère, Yves (2004). Femmes et diplomatie: France, XXe siècle (in French). Peter Lang. ISBN 978-90-5201-233-9.
