= Torra di Sacru =

Genoese coastal defence tower in Corsica

Tower of Sacru
- Torra di Sacru (Corsican)
- Location within Corsica
- 42°47′41″N 9°29′28″E

History
- Built: Second half of 16th century

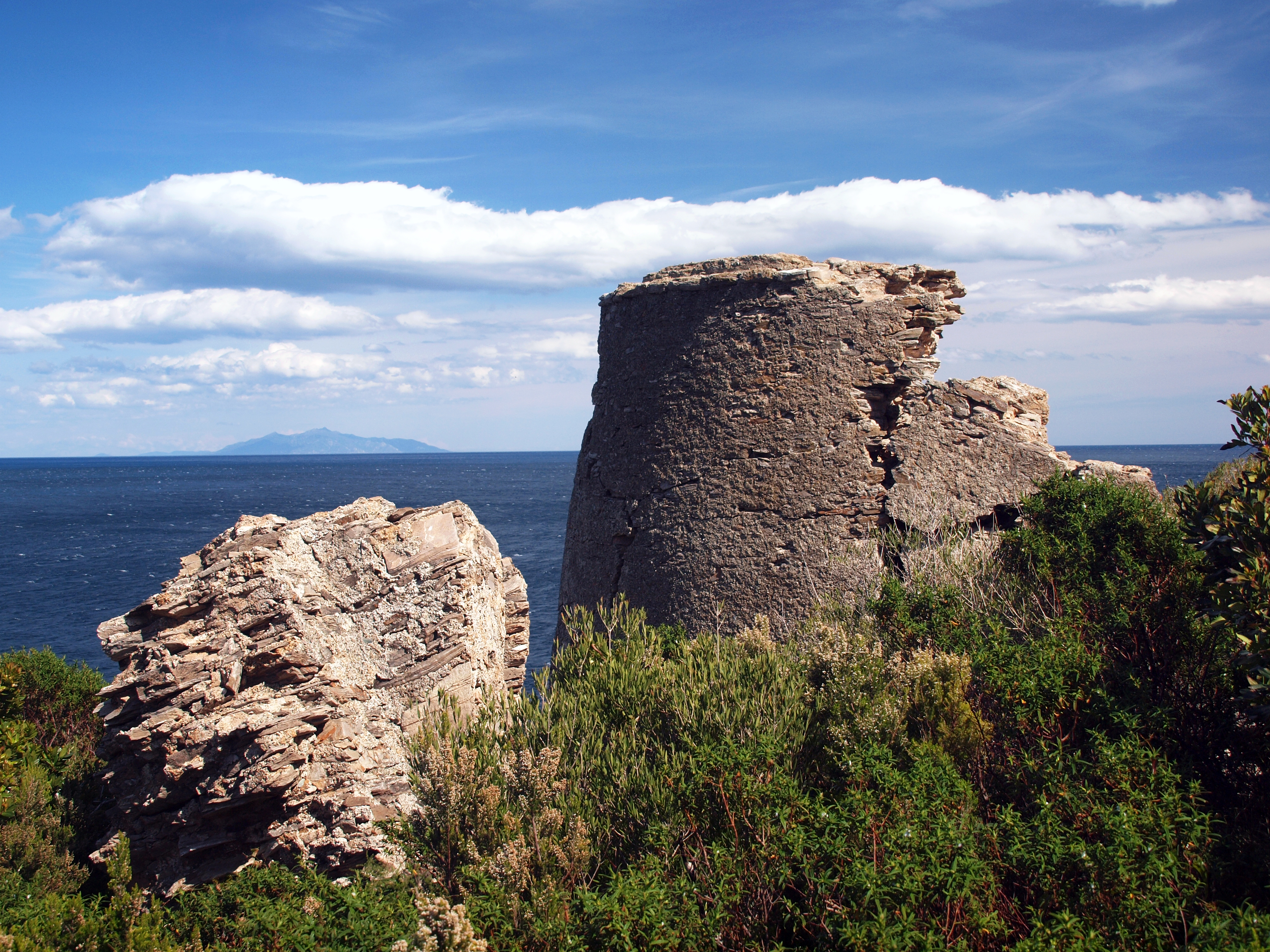

The Tower of Sacru (Corsican: Torra di Sacru) is a ruined Genoese tower located in the commune of Brando, Haute-Corse on the east coast of the Corsica. Only part of the base survives.

The tower was one of a series of coastal defences constructed by the Republic of Genoa between 1530 and 1620 to stem the attacks by Barbary pirates.

== See also ==
- List of Genoese towers in Corsica
