= St George and St Ethelbert's Church, East Ham =

Church in East Ham, London

Coordinates: 51°31′33.555″N 0°2′55.081″E

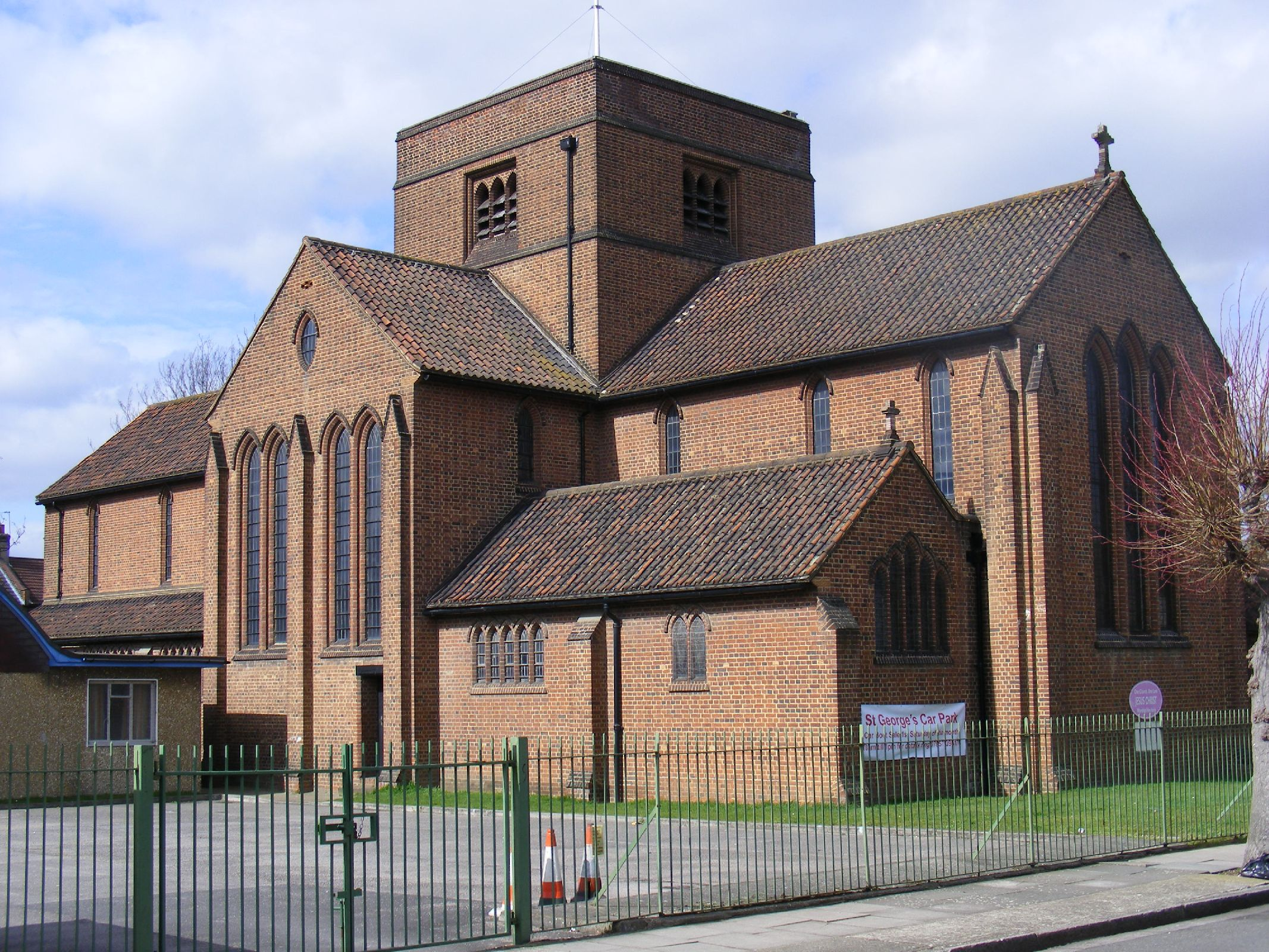
St George and St Ethelbert's Church.

St George and St Ethelbert's Church, East Ham, is a Church of England church in East Ham, east London.

St Mary Magdalene's Church, East Ham built a temporary mission hall known as St George's on the corner of Boston Road and Masterman Road by 1914, on a site bought on the Greatfield Estate around 1912. It became a parish of its own in 1923, though it took until 1936-1937 for a permanent church to be built, with more than 50% of the funding provided by the Diocese of Hereford, which requested the addition of St Ethelbert to the dedication - he is one of the two dedicatees of Hereford Cathedral, the other being the Virgin Mary.
