= Guillaume Mollat =

Belgian historian (1838–1922)

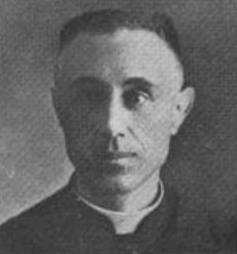
- Born: Guillaume Marie Charles Henri Mollat; 1 February 1877; Nantes, France
- Died: 4 May 1968 (aged 91); Erbalunga, France
- Occupations: Prelate, historian

Guillaume Marie Charles Henri Mollat (French: [ɡijom mɔla]; 1 February 1877 – 4 May 1968) was a French prelate and historian.

== Biography ==
Guillaume Mollat was born in Nantes on 1 February 1877. He studied at the Day School for Children Nantais, then entered the Saint-Sulpice Seminary in Paris in 1896, before completing his theological studies at the French Seminary in Rome. He thereafter integrated the École des hautes études and the Vatican School of Palaeography.

In 1933, he won the Prix of the Académie française for his work La question romaine de Pie VI à Pie XI.

He was elected a member of the Académie des Inscriptions et Belles-Lettres in 1954.

He died in Erbalunga on 4 May 1968.

== Publications (selection) ==
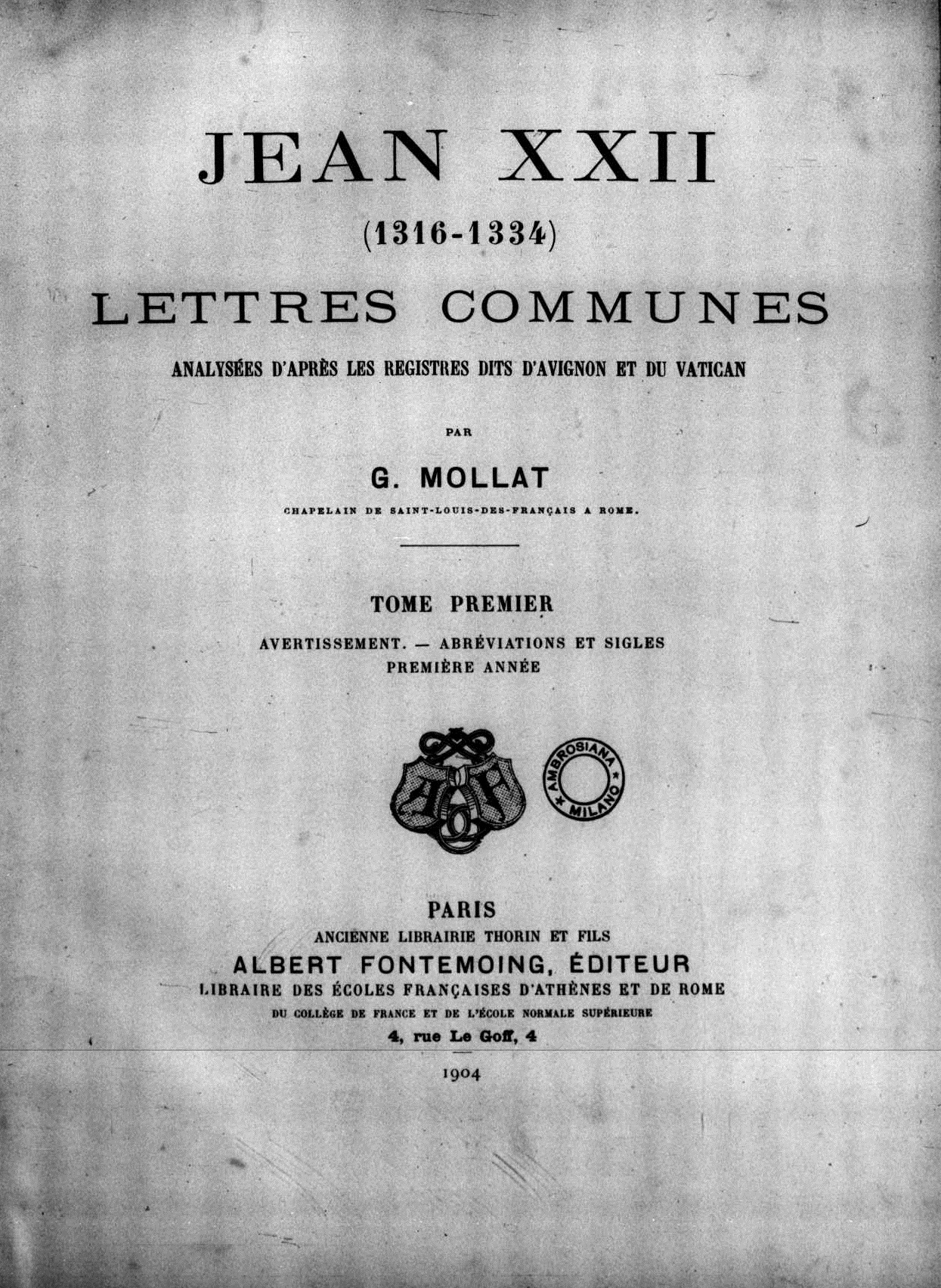
Jean XXII (1316-1334). Lettres communes, 1904

- Mesures fiscales exercées en Bretagne par les papes d'Avignon à l'époque du Grand schisme d'Occident (The Patental Taxation in France in the 14th Century), (1903)
- Lettres communes (Joint Letters), A. Fontemoing, (1904).
- Introduction à l'étude du droit canonique et du droit civile (Introduction to the Study of Canon Law and Civil Law), (1930).
- Lettres secrètes et curiales du pape Gregorius XI 1370–1378 relatives à la France (Secret and Curial Letters of Pope Gregorius XI 1370–1378, Relating to France), (1935).
- Benoit XII (1334–1342): Lettres closes et patentes intéressant los pays autres que la France, publiées ou analysées d'après les registres du Vatican, Volume 1 (Letters Sealed and Patents Concerning Countries Other than France, Published or Analyzed From the Vatican Registers), (1950).
- Le roi de France et la collation plénière (pleno jure) des bénéfices ecclésiastiques étude suivie d'un appendice sur les formulaires de la Chancellerie Royale (The King of France and the Plenary (With Full Right) Conferral of Ecclesiastical Benefices: A Study Followed by an appendix on the Forms of the Royal Chancery), (1951).
- Les Papes d'Avignon: (1305–1378) (The Popes of Avignon [1305-1378]), (1966).
- La Fiscalité Pontificale en France au: (Période d'Avignon et grand Schisme d'Occident) (Papal Taxation in France [during the Avignon Period and the Great Western Schism]), (1968).

== Sources ==
- 1968: Henri-Charles Puech: Éloge funèbre de Mgr Guillaume Mollat, membre libre de l'Académie
- 1968: Charles Samaran: Éloge funèbre de Mgr Guillaume Mollat, académicien libre non résidant
