= Torra d'Erbalunga =

Genoese coastal defence tower in Corsica

Tower of Erbalunga
- Torra d'Erbalunga (Corsican)
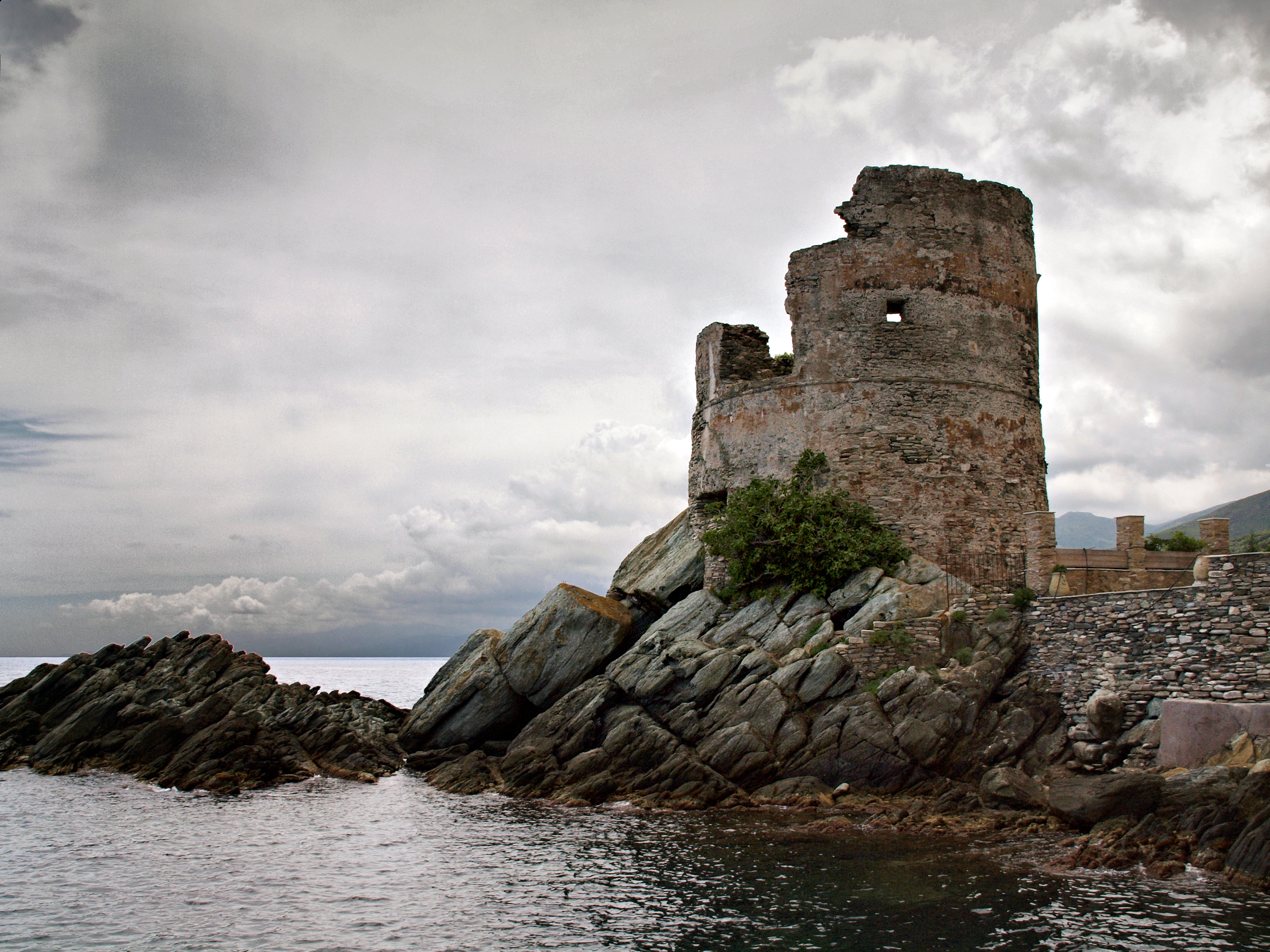

- Location within Corsica
- 42°46′25″N 9°28′37″E

History
- Built: Between 1560 and 1617

Monument historique
- Designated: 24 January 1995
- Reference no.: PA00135319

The Tower of Erbalunga (Corsican: Torra d'Erbalunga) is a ruined Genoese tower near Erbalunga located in the commune of Brando (Haute-Corse) on the east coast of the Cap Corse on the French island of Corsica.

A tower existed at Erbalunga in 1488. It was destroyed by French forces in their invasion of Corsica in 1553 and was then rebuilt when the French withdrew after the treaty of Cateau-Cambrésis. The tower was one of a series of coastal defences constructed by the Republic of Genoa between 1530 and 1620 to stem the attacks by Barbary pirates. In 1927 the tower was listed as one of the official historical monuments of France.

== See also ==
- List of Genoese towers in Corsica
