= Peter M. Jones =

British historian of France

Peter M. Jones is professor of French history at the University of Birmingham. He is a specialist in the French Revolution, rural France, science, and technology in the 18th century, and the history of Birmingham and the West Midlands in the 18th century.

Jones earned his BA at the University of Leeds (1967–70) and his DPhil at the University of Oxford (Balliol College) (1970–73) under Richard Cobb. He did research in France as a boursier of the French government at the University of Toulouse-Le Mirail (1971–72).

Jones is a member of the editorial boards of French History and Annales du Midi, and sits on the management committees of The Archives of Soho and Revolutionaryplayers. He is a jury member for the Prix Baluze (European local history).

== Selected publications ==
- Reform and Revolution in France: the Politics of Transition. Cambridge University Press, Cambridge, 1995.
- The French Revolution in Social and Political Perspective. E. Arnold, London, 1996.
- "Living the Enlightenment and the French Revolution: James Watt, Matthew Boulton and their Sons", Historical Journal, 42 (1999), 157–182.
- Liberty and Locality in Revolutionary France, 1760-1820: Six Villages Compared, 1760-1820. Cambridge University Press, Cambridge, 2003.
- "Industrial Enlightenment in Practice: Visitors to the Soho Manufactory, 1765-1820", Midland History, 33 (2008), 68–96.
- The French Revolution, 1787-1804. Longman, London, 2003 (Seminar Studies in History) (2nd edn. 2009; 3rd edn. 2016; 4th edn. 2021).
- Industrial Enlightenment: Science, Technology and Culture in Birmingham and the West Midlands, 1760-1820. Manchester University Press, Manchester, 2009.
