= Æthelred I of East Anglia =

8th-century king of East Anglia

Æthelred I was a semi-historical eighth-century king of East Anglia, an Anglo-Saxon kingdom which today includes the English counties of Norfolk and Suffolk. He may have ruled between 760 and 790, holding the kingdom of the East Angles during the overlordship of Offa of Mercia.

There is no coinage known for Æthelred (as a client king of Offa he may have not been given that privilege) and the only historical sources that name him date from after the Norman conquest of England, including the Lives of St Æthelberht and the regnal lists of William of Malmesbury. The legendary narratives of Æthelberht relate that Æthelred and his queen Leofruna dwelt at Beodricesworth, now the Suffolk town of Bury St. Edmunds.

Æthelred was the father of Æthelberht II of East Anglia, who succeeded him in the 770s.

== Sources ==
- Horstmann, Carl (1901). Nova legenda Anglie (in Latin). Vol. 1. Oxford: Clarenden Press. OCLC 847941193.
- William of Malmesbury (1847). Chronicle of the Kings of England. Giles, J. A. (trans.). London: Bohn. p. 89. "William of Malmesbury's Chronicle of the kings of England."

Preceded by Beonna and Alberht and possibly Hun	legendary King of East Anglia subject to Offa of Mercia ?760s – ?770s	Succeeded by Æthelbert (II)
