= Erbalunga =

Village in Corsica

Coordinates: 42°46′27″N 9°28′30″E

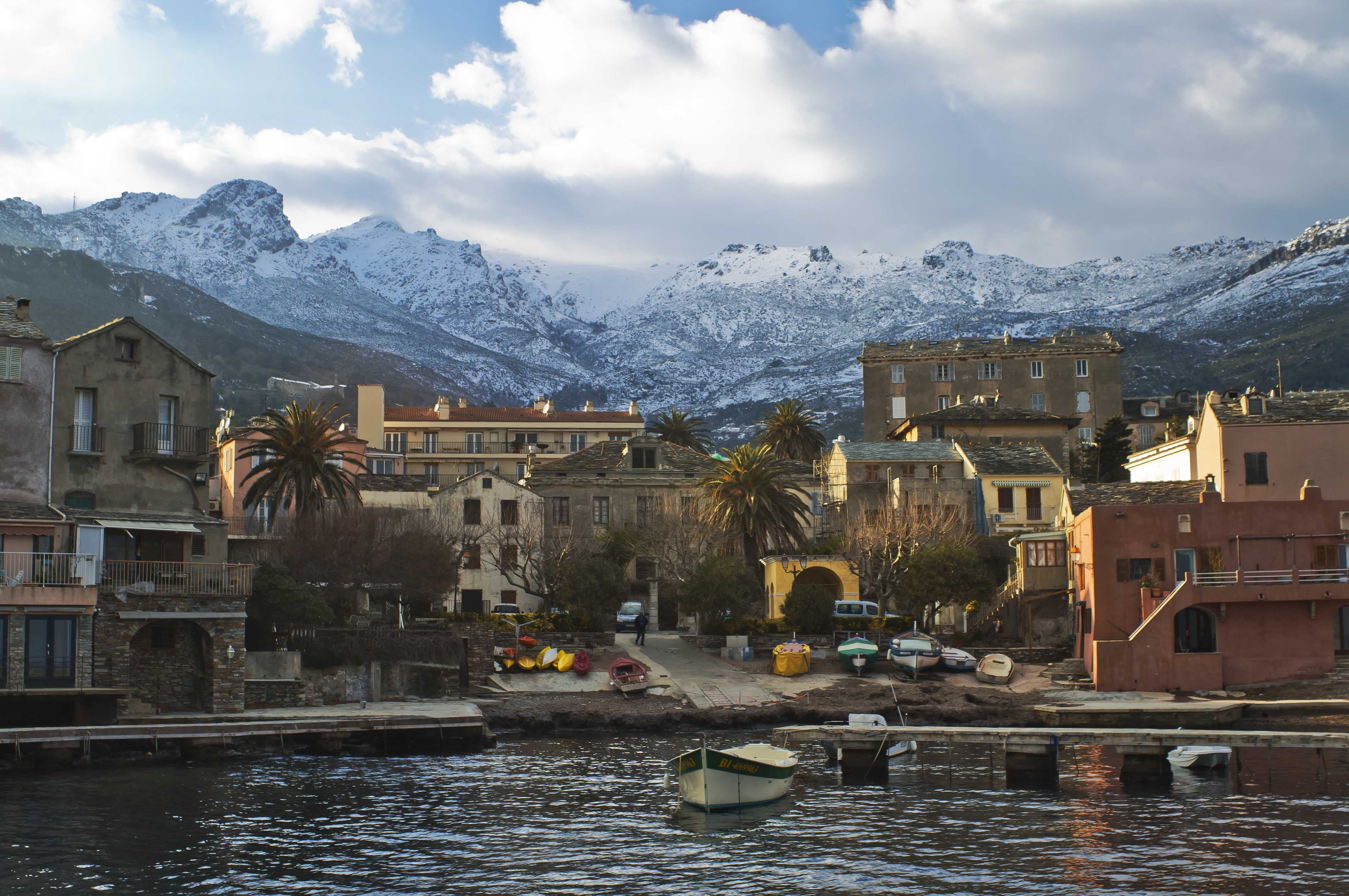
Winter view of Erbalunga

Erbalunga or Erbalonga is an ancient fishing village on Cap Corse, in the municipality of Brando in the French department of Haute-Corse, Corsica. The village of Erbalonga is the most northerly coastal settlement of Cap Corse, with vertiginous roads and sloping maquis beyond.

== History ==
The region of Cap Corse has been occupied since antiquity—the geographer Ptolemy called it the "Sacred Promontory" (sacrem promontorium). In medieval times, Erbalunga began exporting wine and olive oil from the 11th century, becoming more important as a trading centre than Ajaccio or Bastia. As nobles from Genoa and Pisa vied between themselves for financial control over Corsica, a fortress was built at Erbalunga; it was granted a fiefdom in 1438, on the death of the nobleman Mathieu de Gentile, ruled over by the de Gentile family in their palazzo on the main square (Place Charles de Gaulle). In the 1550s, following long-standing internecine disputes, the de Gentile family lost control of Cap Corse, with French troops destroying the port in 1557. The site is still dominated by the surviving 16th-century Genoese Tour d'Erbalunga (Corsican: Torra d'Erbalunga), set on a rock in the sea below. The partially ruined tower bears a plaque dated 1561 and is listed as a French historical monument.

Modern Erbalunga comprises the quarters of Poggiolo and Curcianella to the south together with Foce and Sicolu to the north. The historic quarters have the Corsican names Calellu, Torre, Cima, Trave, Scalu, Casanova, Piandifora and Concia. With old stone-walled houses built directly on to the harbour and plane, laurel and palm trees shading its flowered squares, Erbalunga retains the character and charm of a small fishing port. Nevertheless, from the 12th to the 18th century, it was one of the main ports of Corsica. During the 1930s, the port became an artists' colony, nicknamed the Collioure du Cap, with painters attracted by its fishing boats and vibrant colours.

The village church of St Erasmus, the patron saint of sailors, has a baroque facade. In the chapel adjacent to the church are 14th-century frescoes, depicting St Catherine and Christ. The frescoes are also designated as French historical monuments. The harbour provides shelter for the chapel of the Madonna del Carmine and its cemetery. Religious events, centred on St Erasmus, include the carrying of the Cross by penitents on Good Friday—a ceremony called Cerca, originating from an ancient fertility rite—and a procession celebrating his saint's day (2 June) with a blessing of the sea. In August there is a regular music festival, the Festival de Musique d'Erbalunga, with open-air concerts in the main square.

To the north of Erbalunga, in the Cintulino district, is the Benedictine monastery of the Holy Sacrament (French: Monastère des Bénédictines du Saint-Sacrement) for nuns, founded in 1862. The convent church was constructed between 1883 and 1887 and dedicated to the Sacred Heart of Jesus. The associated girls boarding school operated between 1899 and 1963. The monastery was converted into an institute in 1951.

== Gallery ==
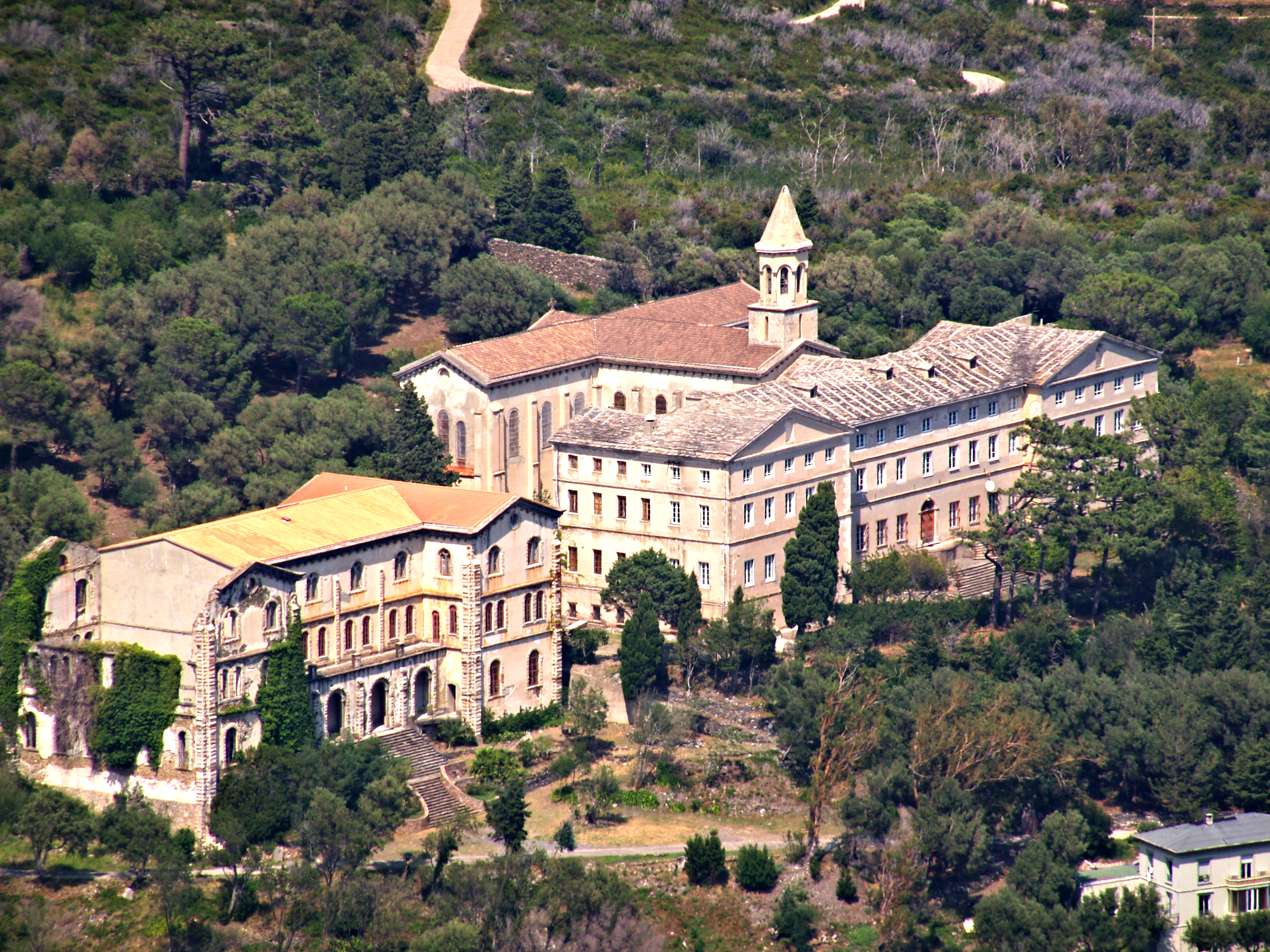
Benedictine monastery

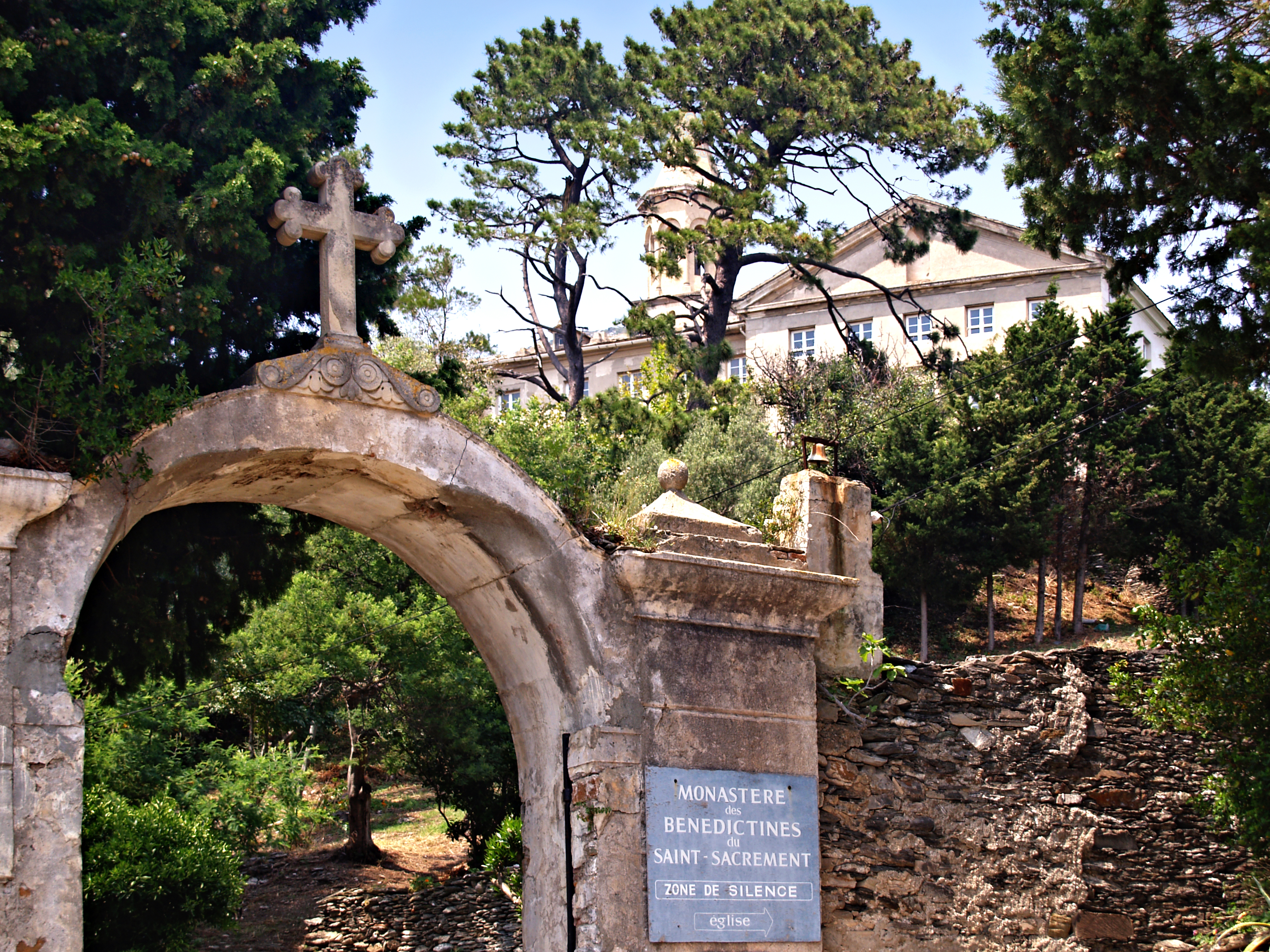
Entrance to the monastery

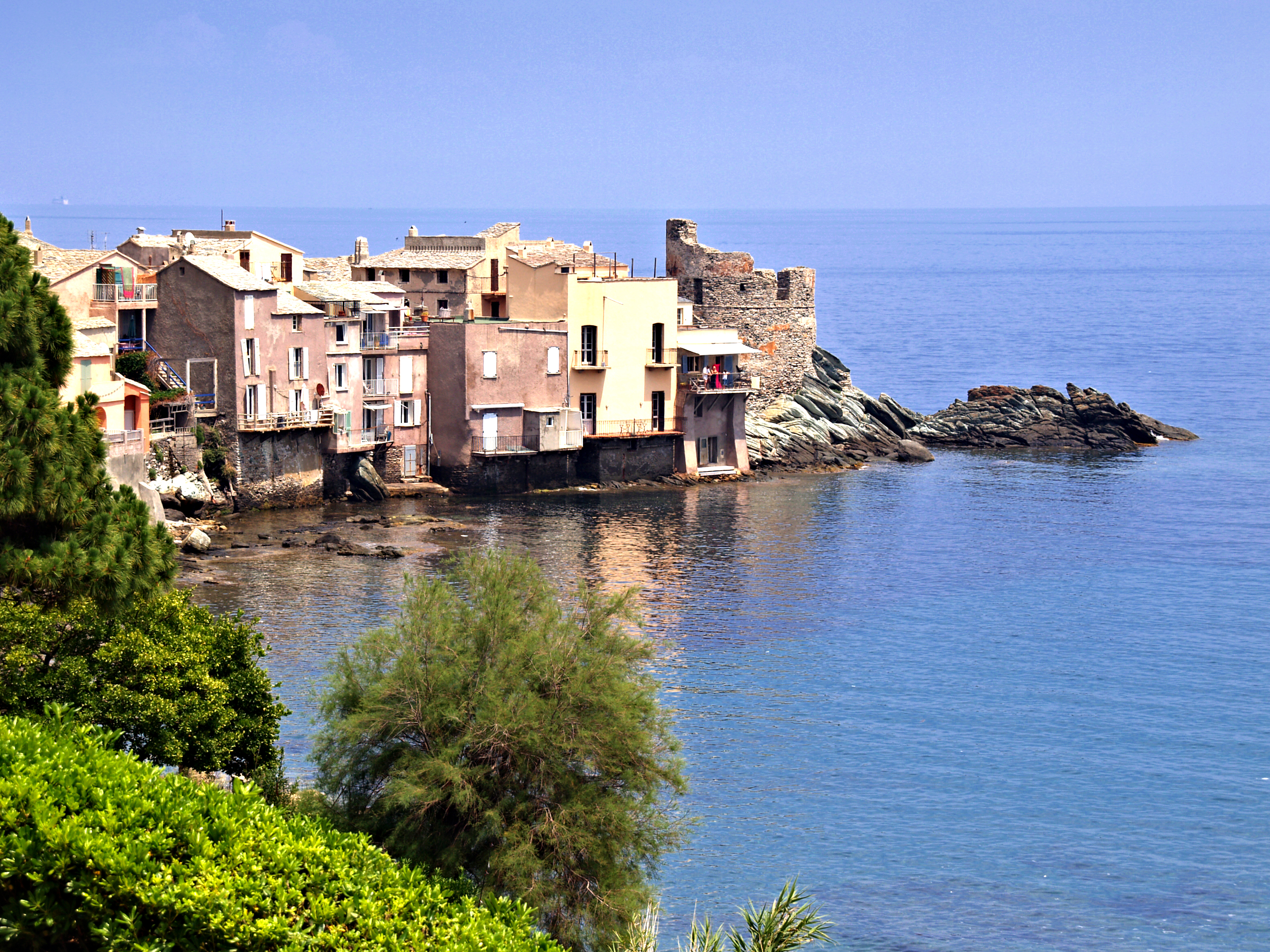
Marine view of Erbalunga

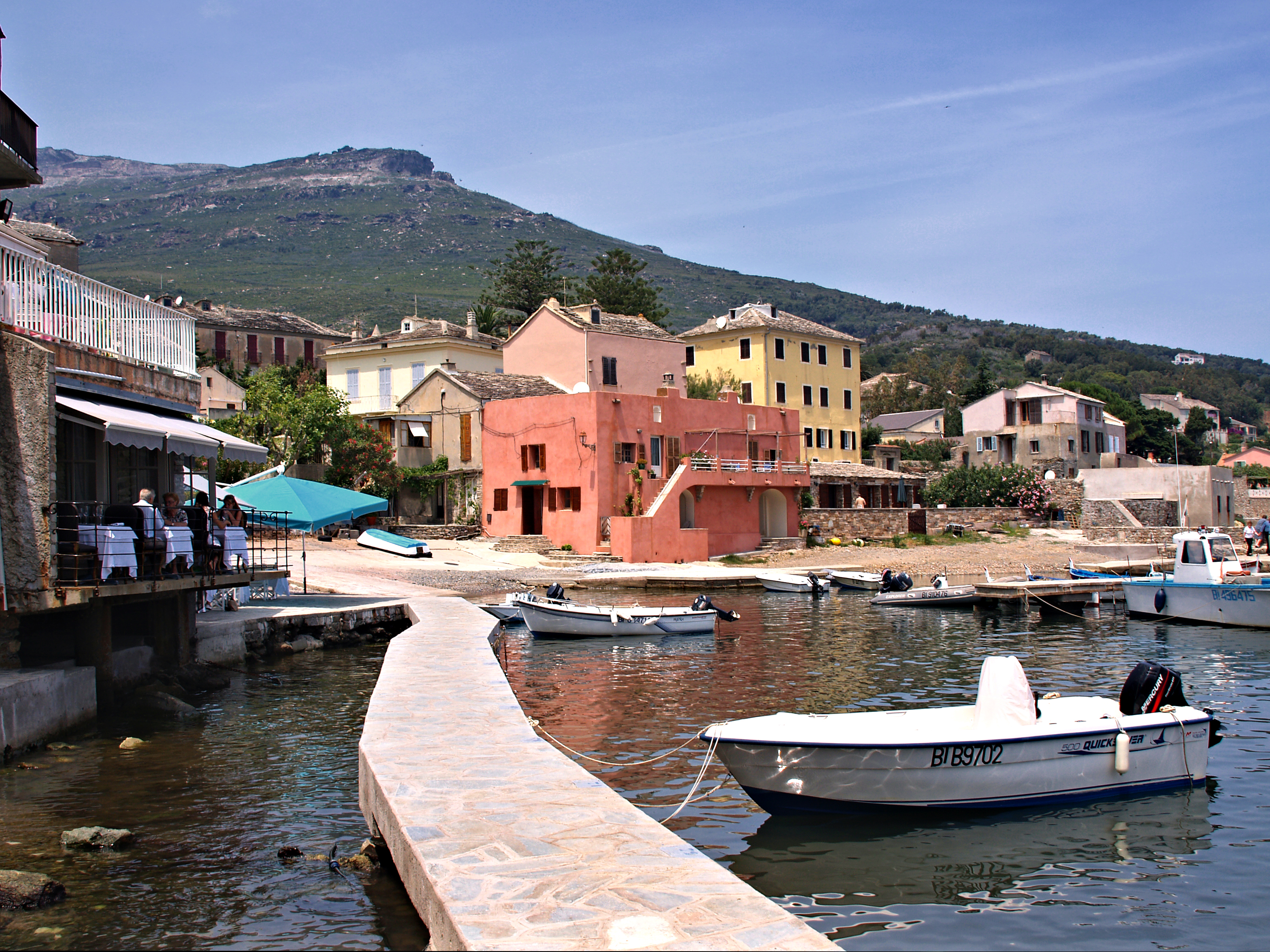
The harbour

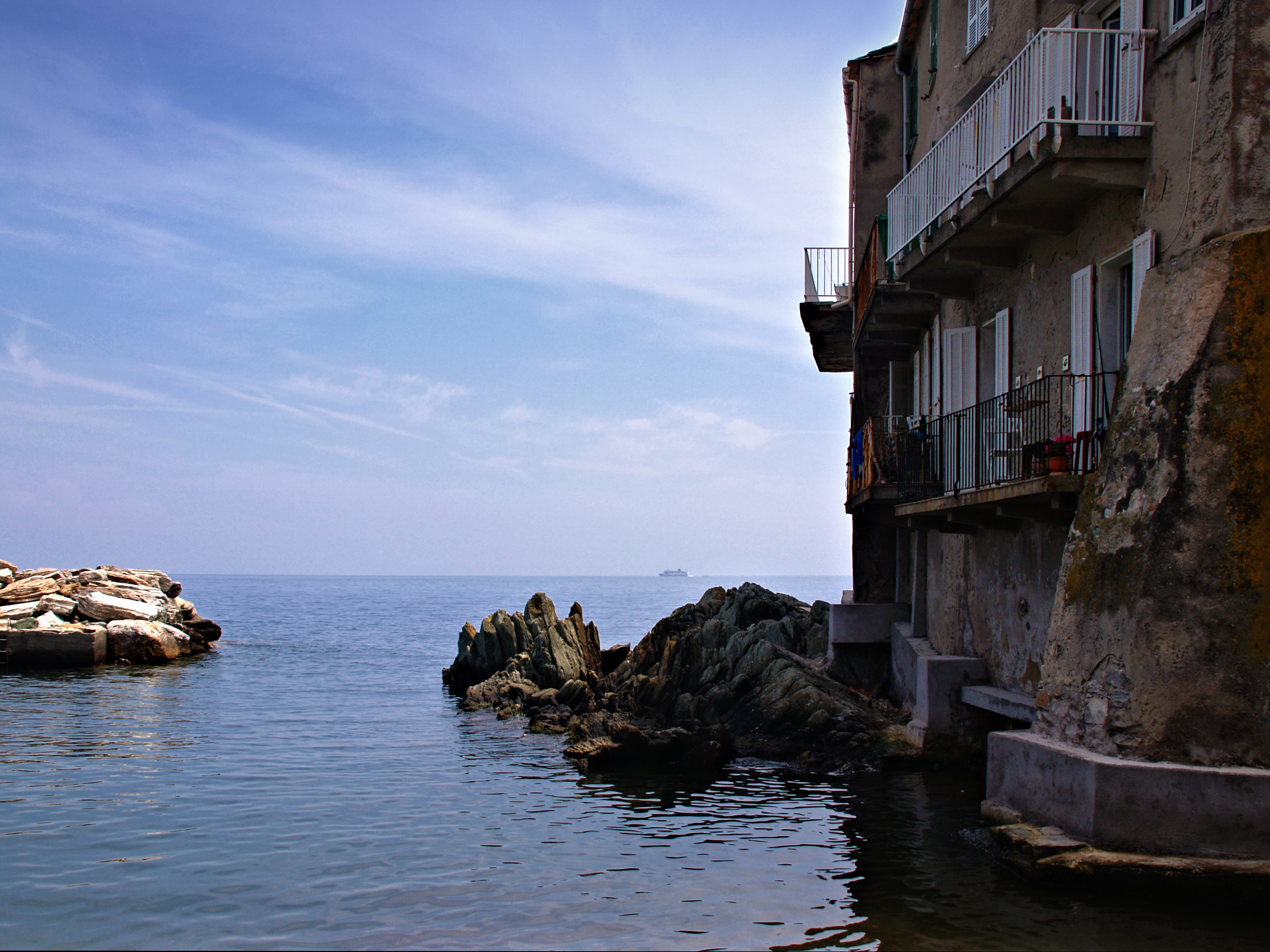
Harbour entrance

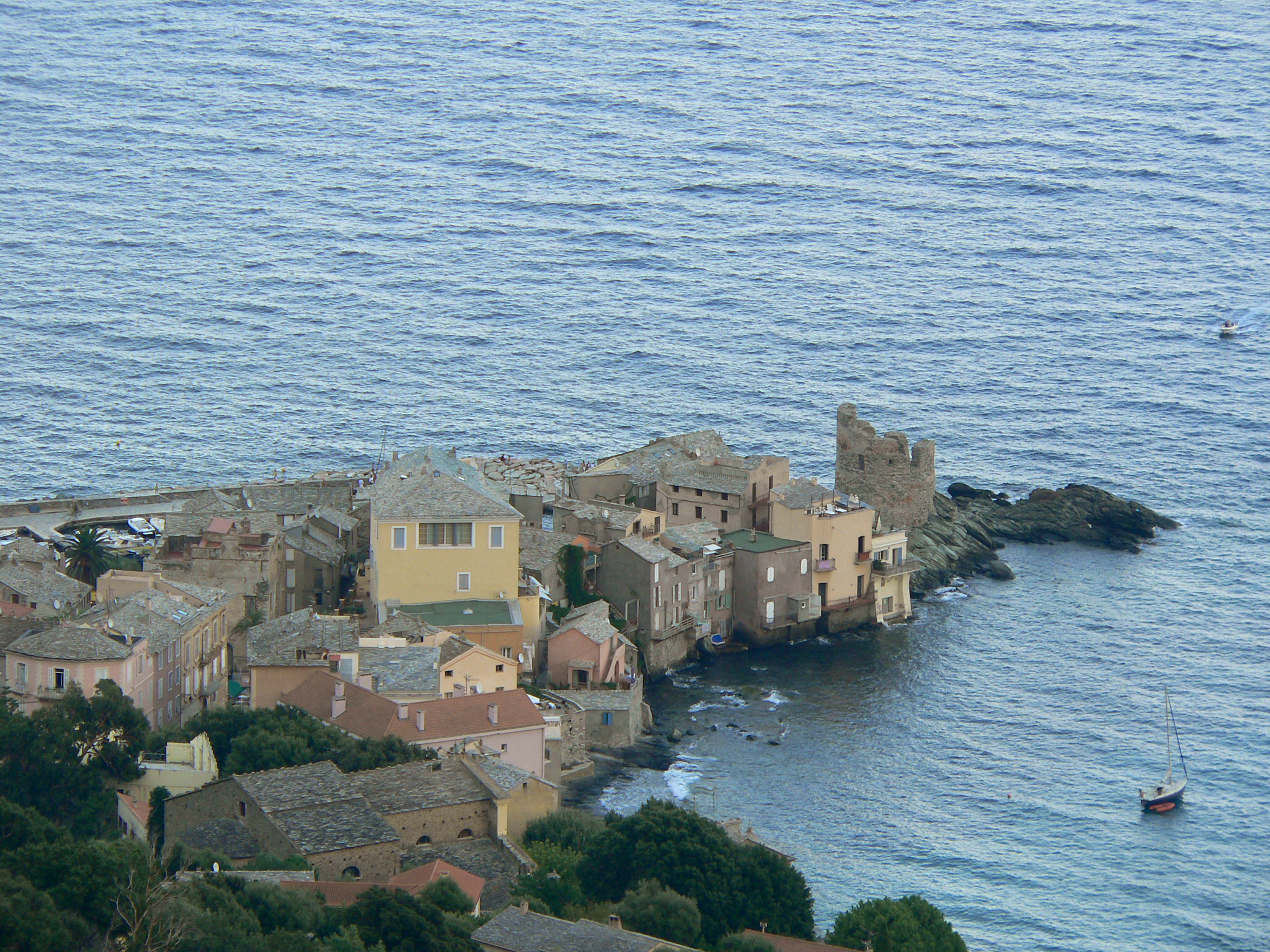
Erbalunga from above

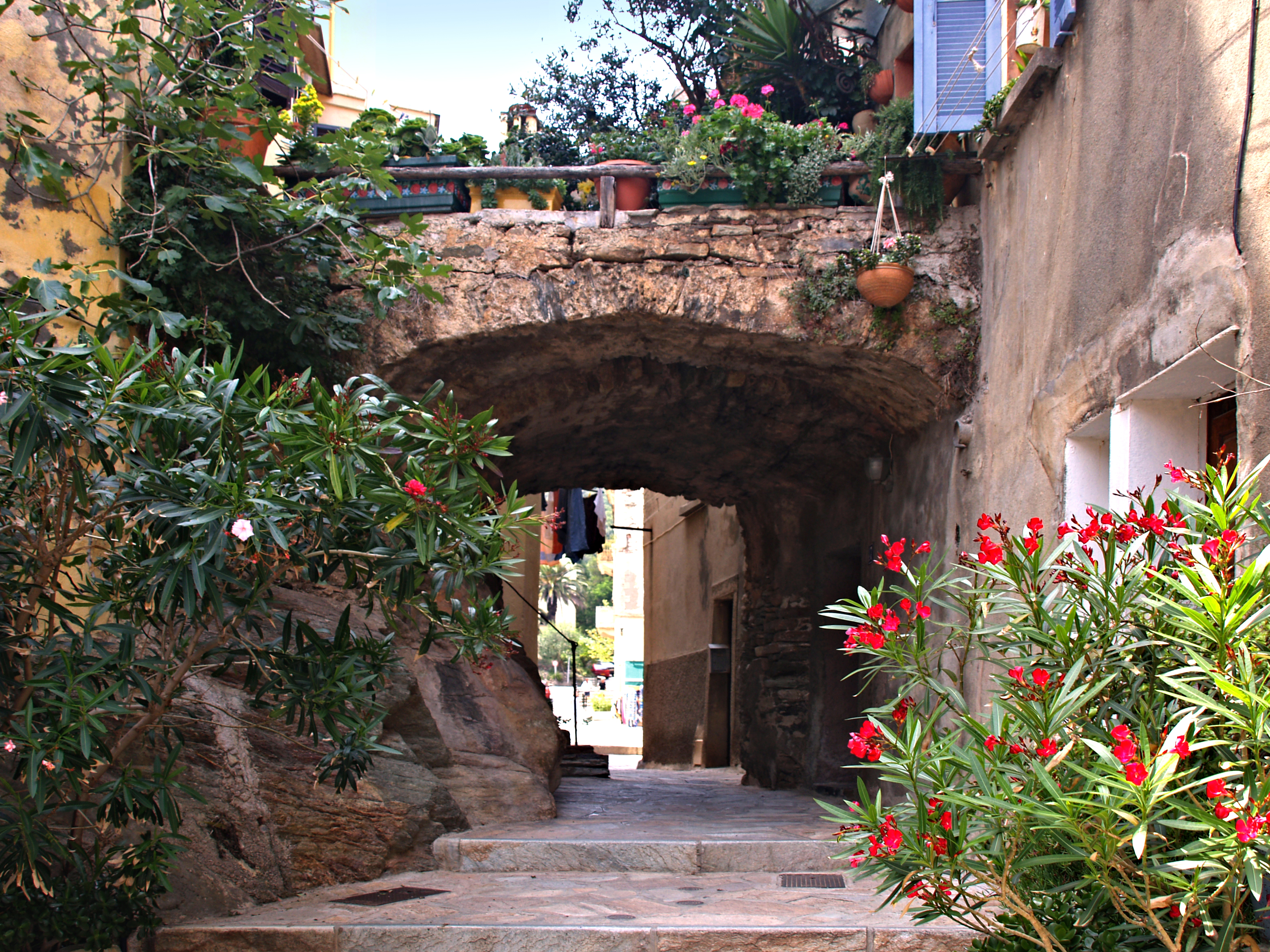
A side alley

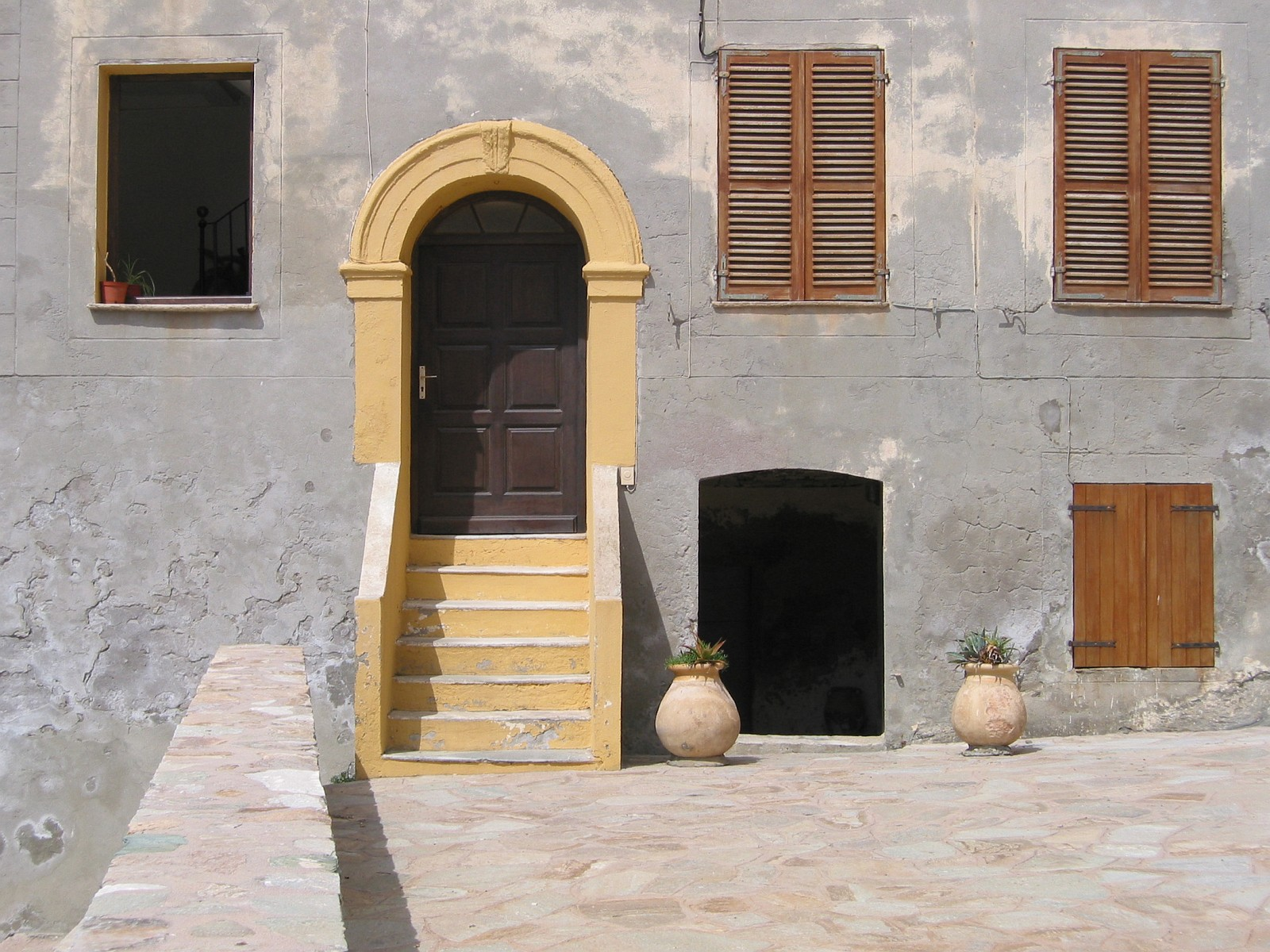
House in Erbalunga
