= Brando, Haute-Corse =

Brando
- Commune
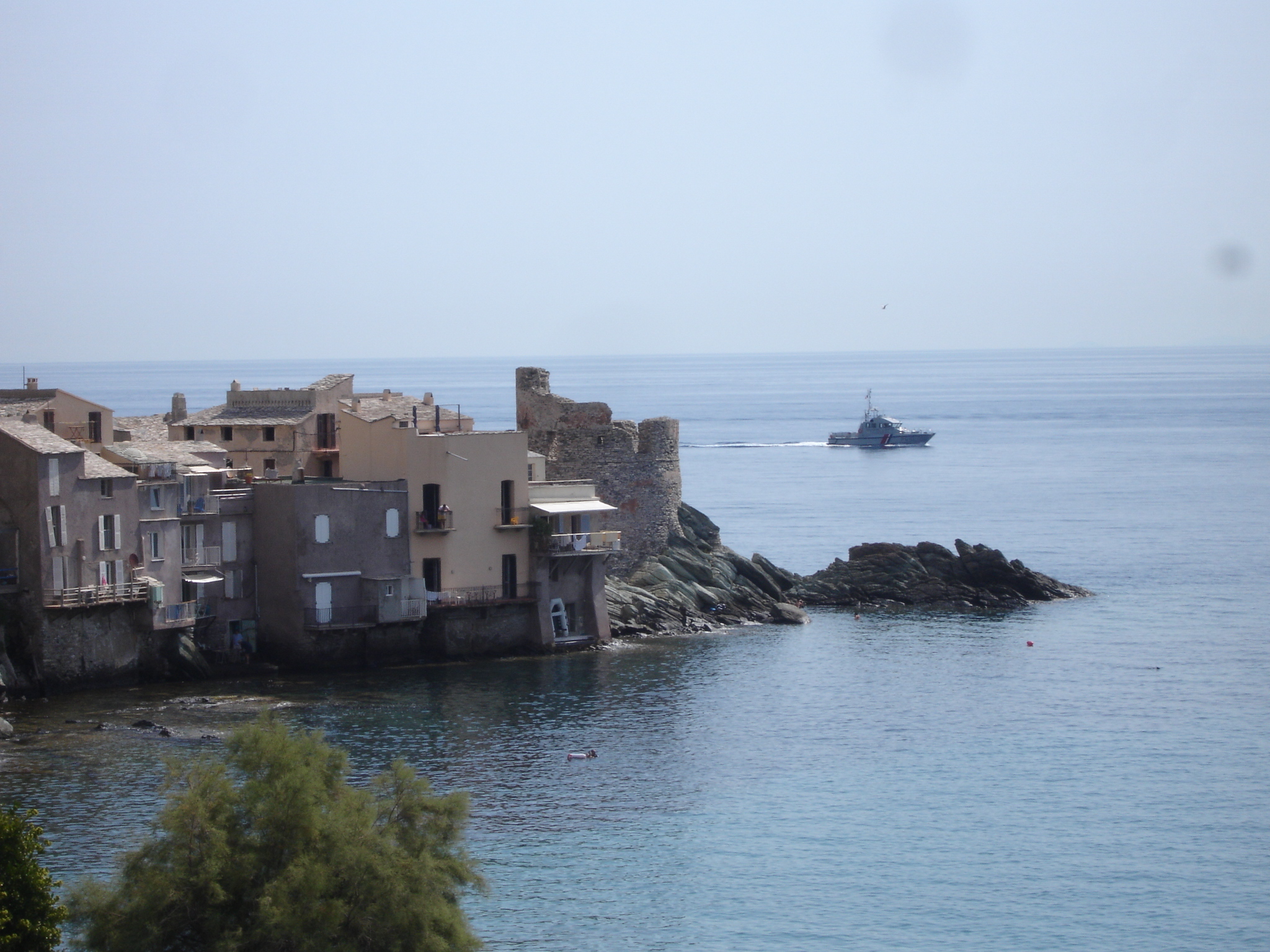
- Erbalunga and Genoese tower
- Location of Brando
- Location within France Location within Corsica
- Coordinates: 42°46′34″N 9°28′34″E
- Country: France
- Region: Corsica
- Department: Haute-Corse
- Arrondissement: Bastia
- Canton: Cap Corse
- Intercommunality: Cap Corse

Government
  - Mayor (2020–2026): Patrick Sanguinetti
- Area^{1}: 22.22 km^{2} (8.58 sq mi)
- Elevation: 300 m (980 ft)
- Highest elevation: 1,306 m (4,285 ft)
- Lowest elevation: 0 m (0 ft)
- Population (2023): 1,584
  - Density: 71.29/km^{2} (184.6/sq mi)
- Demonym(s): brandenais.e (French) brandincu, brandinca (Corsican) brandinco, brandinca, brandese (Italian)
- Time zone: UTC+01:00 (CET)
  - Summer (DST): UTC+02:00 (CEST)
- INSEE/Postal code: 2B043 /20222
- ^{1} French Land Register data, which excludes lakes, ponds, glaciers > 1 km^{2} (0.386 sq mi or 247 acres) and river estuaries.

Brando (French pronunciation: [bʁɑ̃do], Corsican: Brandu) is a French commune in the Haute-Corse department, island of Corsica.

== Population ==
Historical population
Year	Pop.	±% p.a.
1968	1,066	—
1975	1,157	+1.18%
1982	1,353	+2.26%
1990	1,334	−0.18%
1999	1,527	+1.51%
2007	1,537	+0.08%
2012	1,654	+1.48%
2017	1,630	−0.29%
2023	1,584	−0.48%
Source: INSEE

== See also ==
- Torra d'Erbalunga
- Torra di Sacru

== See also ==
- Communes of the Haute-Corse department
