= Midland History =

History journal

- Discipline: European history
- Language: English
- Edited by: Malcolm Dick

Publication details
- History: 1971–present
- Publisher: Taylor & Francis (United Kingdom)
- Frequency: Biannually

Standard abbreviations
- ISO 4: Midl. Hist.

Indexing
- ISSN: 0047-729X (print); 1756-381X (web)
- OCLC no.: 01757425

Links
- Journal homepage

Midland History is a peer-reviewed academic journal of the history of the Midlands region of England. It was established in 1971 and is published by Taylor & Francis for the University of Birmingham.
