= Æthelberht II of East Anglia =

8th-century king and saint

Saint Ethelbert of East Anglia
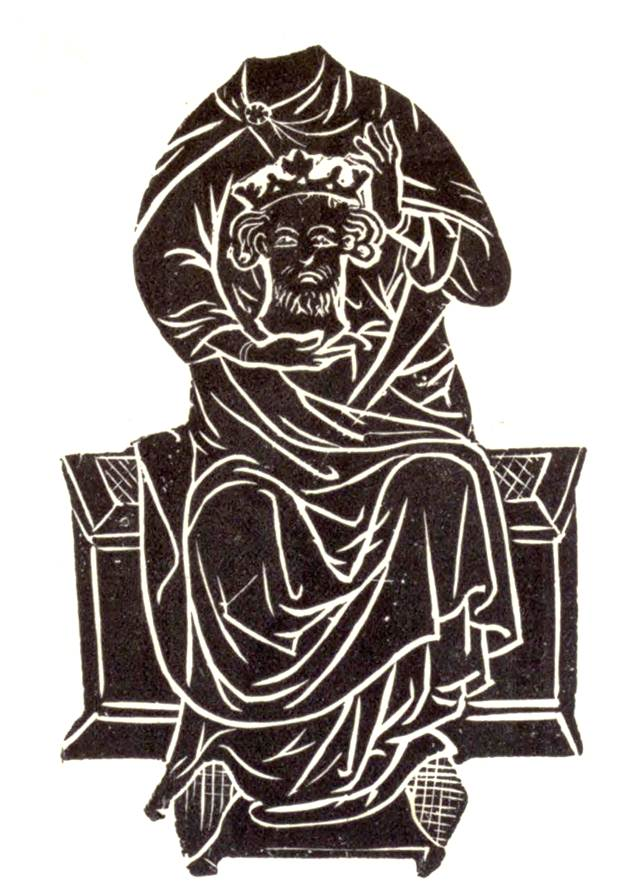
- Brass plate from Hereford Cathedral
- Born: c. 774
- Died: 20 May 794 (aged 19–20); Hereford
- Cause of death: Decapitation
- Venerated in: Catholic Church, Church of England
- Major shrine: Hereford Cathedral, England
- Feast: 20 May
- Attributes: A young king, sometimes bearded, holding a church and a palm branch
- Patronage: Hereford, England

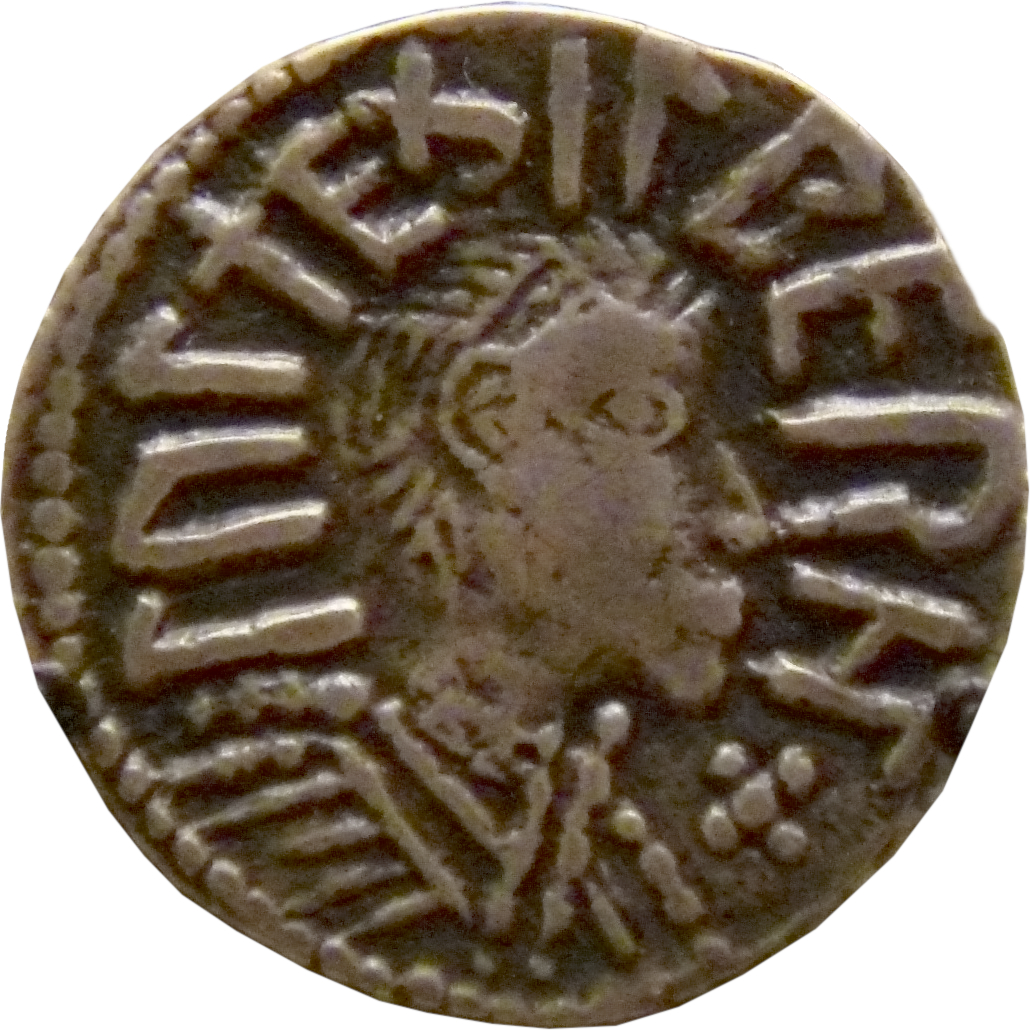
One of the four known coins depicting Æthelberht II (British Museum)

Æthelberht (Old English: Æðelbrihte, Æþelberhte), also called Saint Ethelbert the King (c. 774 – 20 May 794) was an 8th-century saint and a king of East Anglia, the Anglo-Saxon kingdom which today includes the English counties of Norfolk and Suffolk. Little is known of his reign, which may have begun in 779, according to later sources, and very few of the coins he issued have been discovered. It is known from the Anglo-Saxon Chronicle that he was killed on the orders of Offa of Mercia in 794.

Æthelberht was locally canonised and became the focus of cults in East Anglia and at Hereford, where the shrine of the saintly king once existed. In the absence of known historical facts, medieval chroniclers provided their own details for his ancestry, life as king, and death at the hands of Offa. His feast day is 20 May. There are churches in Norfolk, Suffolk, and western England dedicated to him and he is a joint patron of Hereford Cathedral.

== Life and reign ==
The kingdom of East Anglia

Æthelberht's name in the Anglo-Saxon Chronicle

Little is known of Æthelberht's life or reign, as few East Anglian records have survived from this period. Æthelberht's reign may have begun in 779, the date provided on the uncertain authority of a much later saint's life. Medieval chroniclers have provided dubious accounts of his life, in the absence of any real details. The first extensive accounts of his life date to the 12th century and are connected to his cult centred at Hereford Cathedral. The earliest of these, the Passio S. Æthelberhti, authored around 1080, records that Æthelberht's parents were Æthelred I of East Anglia and Leofrana of Mercia.

It narrates in detail a story of Æthelberht's piety, election as king, and wise rule. Urged to marry against his will, he apparently agreed to wed Eadburh, the daughter of Offa of Mercia, and set out to visit her, despite his mother's forebodings and his experiences of terrifying events—an earthquake, a solar eclipse and a vision. This story is recounted in later saints' lives by Osbert of Clare and Gerald of Wales, and elements of it were borrowed into the histories of William of Malmesbury, Roger of Wendover, Matthew Paris and Richard of Cirencester, among other later medieval chroniclers.

Four pennies minted by Æthelberht are known (as of 2014)—two of which have been known since the 18th century, and one since the beginning of the 20th century. One of these, a "light" penny, said to have been discovered in 1908 at Tivoli, near Rome, is similar in type to the coinage of Offa. On one side is the word REX, with an image of Romulus and Remus suckling a wolf: the obverse names the King and his moneyer, Lul, who also struck coins for Offa and Coenwulf of Mercia. The author Andy Hutcheson has suggested that the use of runes on the coin may signify "continuing strong control by local leaders". The numismatist Marion Archibald notes that the issuing of "flattering" coins of this type, with the intention to win friends in Rome, probably indicated that as a sub-king, Æthelberht, was assuming "a greater degree of independence than [Offa] was prepared to tolerate".

The coins provide one of the few contemporary sources for Æthelberht. In March 2014, metal detectorist Darrin Simpson found a coin minted by Æthelbert in a Sussex field. Such coins, struck as a sign of independence, may have led to Æthelbert's death. It sold at auction on 11 June 2014 for £78,000. According to the British numismatist Rory Naismith, "Æthelberht's coins could have been issued over a number of years, either during a spell when some or all of East Anglia asserted independence from Offa, or by some sort of arrangement to share minting rights with the Mercian ruler." Offa stopped Æthelberht from minting his own coins.

In 793 the vulnerability of the English east coast was exposed when the monastery at Lindisfarne was looted by Vikings, and a year later Jarrow was also attacked, which the historian Steven Plunkett reasons would ensure that the East Anglians were "forced to seek firm leadership" in order to strengthen the region's defences. Æthelberht's claim to belong to the ruling Wuffingas dynasty, suggested by the use of a Roman she-wolf and the title REX on his coins, arose from the need for strong kingship in response to the Viking attacks.

== Death and canonisation ==
In 794, Æthelberht was put to death by Offa under unclear circumstances. According to the historian Andy Todd, Æthelberht was killed at the royal estate of Sutton in Herefordshire, while Michael Lapidge locates the murder at the nearby village of Marden. According to the Anglo-Saxon Chronicle, he was beheaded. Medieval sources tell how he was captured while visiting his intended bride Ælfthryth and was then murdered and buried. While the Passio S. Æthelberhti implies that Offa's queen, Cynethryth, was complicit in the murder, she becomes the focus of the plot in later versions of the story.

John of Worcester in the 12th century declared that Cynethryth persuaded her husband to kill his guest. Roger of Wendover in the 13th century, whose account is borrowed by Matthew Paris, offers a story in which Cynethryth personally oversees a trap in which Æthelberht falls into a pit in his bedroom, at the bottom of which her executioners were waiting. Roger was based at the Abbey of St Albans which was founded by King Offa. Matthew Firth argues that Roger had vested interest in absolving Offa of his role in the martyrdom of the saint.

Richard of Cirencester, writing in the 15th century, states that Æthelberht was bound and beheaded by a certain Grimbert, at the queen's urging, and disposed of his body. Another 15th-century text, Chronicon attributed to John Brompton, reports how the King's detached head fell off a cart into a ditch where it was found, before it restored a blind man's sight. According to the Chronicon, Ælfthryth became a recluse at Crowland and her remorseful father founded monasteries, gave land to the Church and travelled on a pilgrimage to Rome.

The execution of an Anglo-Saxon king on the orders of another ruler was very rare, although criminals were hanged and beheaded, as has been discovered at Sutton Hoo. Æthelberht's death made the possibility of any peaceful union between the Anglian peoples, including Mercia, less likely than before.

== Legacy ==
=== Veneration ===
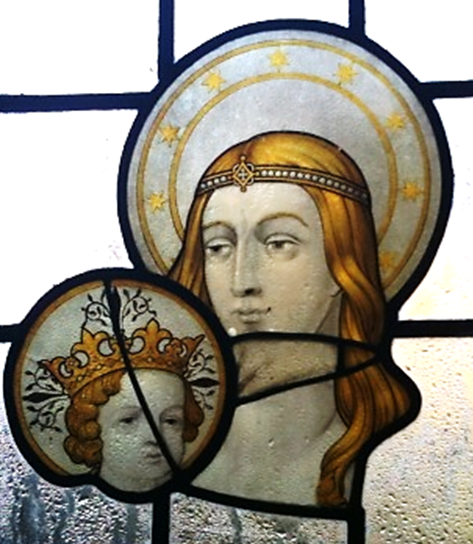
St Ethelbert (left) with Christ, from St Ethelbert's Church, Alby, Norfolk

After his death, Æthelberht was canonised by the English Church. He was venerated in religious cults in both East Anglia and at Hereford. The Anglo-Saxon church of the episcopal estate at Hoxne Bishopric was one of several dedicated to him in Suffolk. The church is mentioned in the will of Theodreusus, Bishop of London and Hoxne (c. 938 – c. 951), which is a possible indication of the existence of a religious cult devoted to the saintly king.

Very few dedications for Æthelberht are near where he died – Hereford Cathedral and, some way off, Littledean in Gloucestershire – the other eleven being in Norfolk or Suffolk. The historian Lawrence Butler has argued that this unusual pattern may be explained by the existence of a royal cult in East Anglia, which represented a "revival of Christianity after the Danish settlement by commemorating a politically 'safe' and corporeally distant local ruler".

=== Christian buildings dedicated to Æthelberht ===
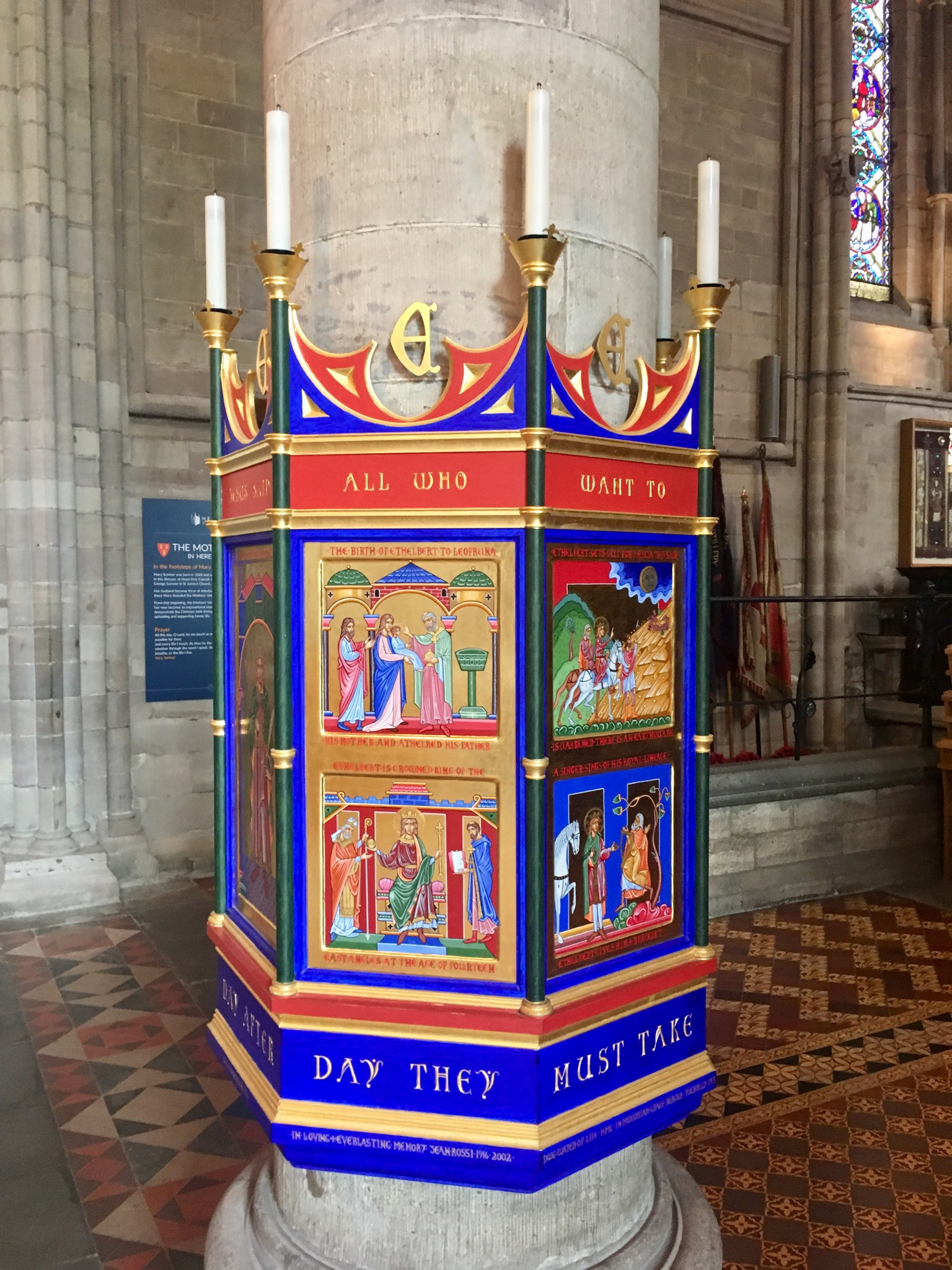
The modern (2008) shrine of St Ethelbert in Hereford Cathedral

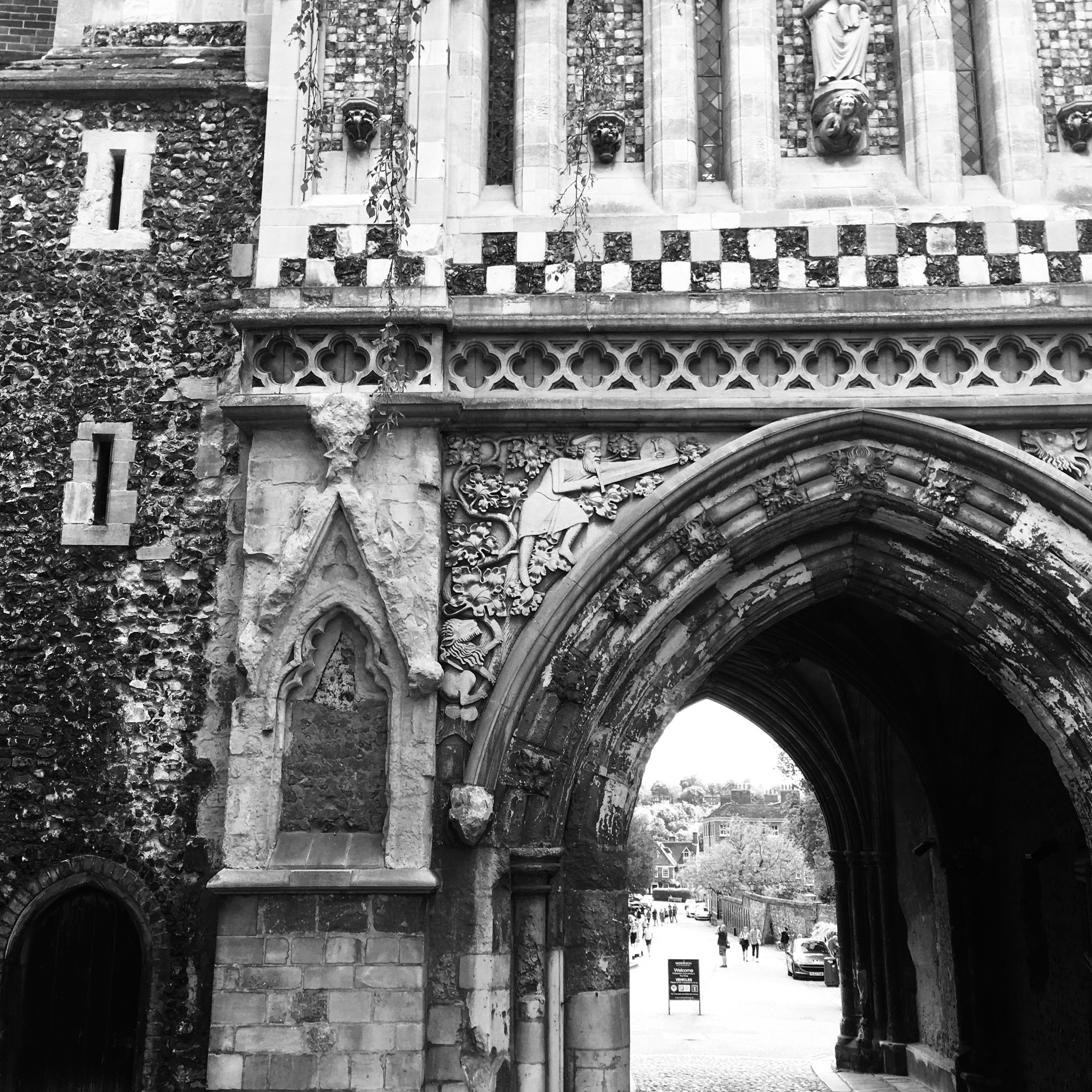
A portion of the Saint Ethelbert Gate at Norwich Cathedral

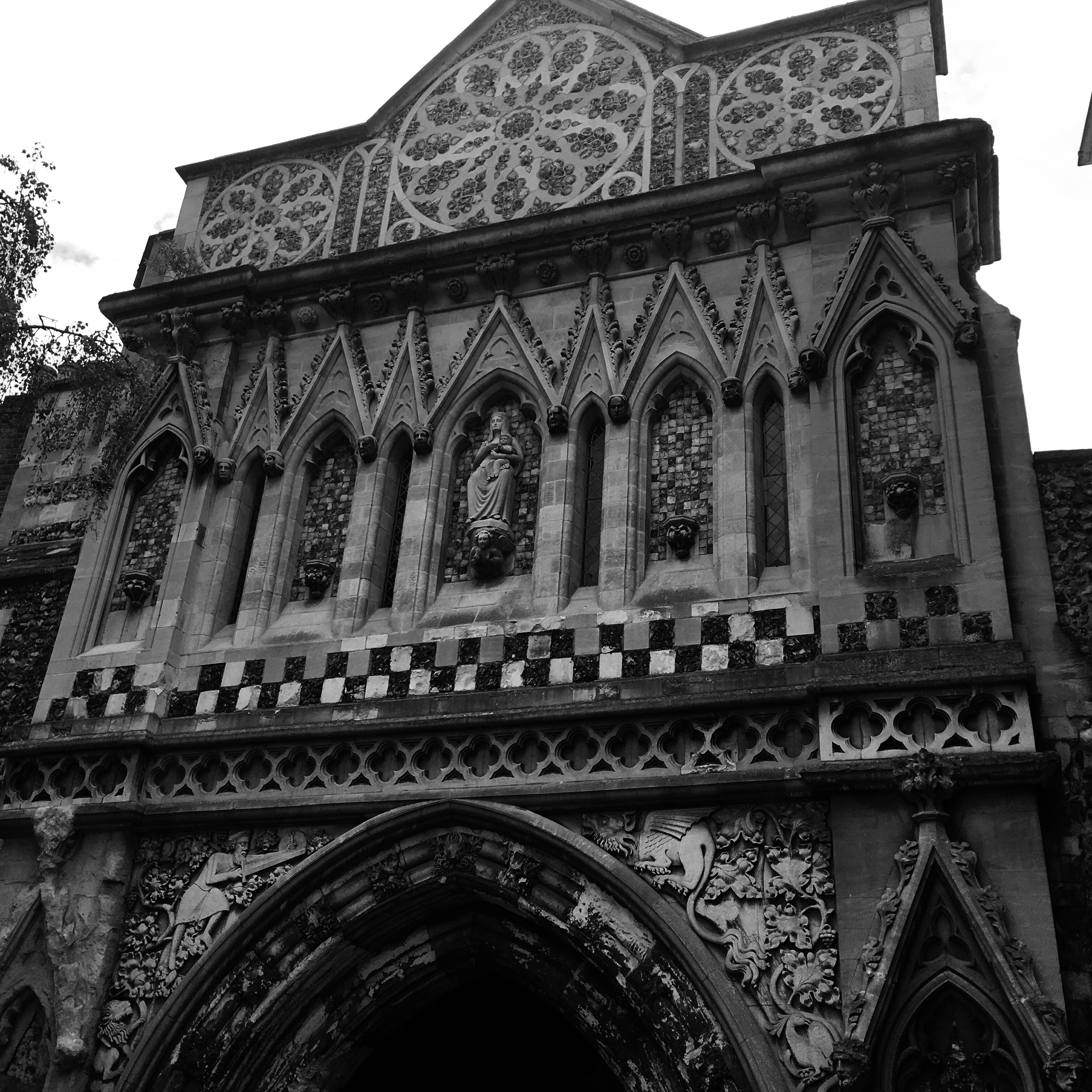
The upper part of the St Ethelbert Gate at Norwich Cathedral

The Blessed Virgin Mary and St Ethelbert are joint patron saints of Hereford Cathedral, where the music for the Office of St Ethelbert survives in the 13th-century Hereford Noted Breviary.

St Ethelbert's Gate is one of the two main entrances to the precinct of Norwich Cathedral. The chapel at Albrightestone, at a location near an important excavated Anglo-Saxon cemetery at Boss Hall in Ipswich, was dedicated to Æthelberht. In Wiltshire, the Church of England parish church at Luckington is dedicated to St Mary and St Ethelbert. In Norfolk, the Church of England parish churches at Alby, East Wretham, Larling, Thurton, Mundham and Burnham Sutton, where there are remains of the ruined church, are dedicated to St Ethelbert.

The Suffolk churches at Falkenham, Hessett, Herringswell and Tannington are all dedicated to the saint. In neighbouring Essex, the parish church at Belchamp Otten is dedicated to St Ethelbert and All Saints. The church at Stanway, originally an Anglo-Saxon chapel, is dedicated to St Albright, which is believed to be the same saint. In 1937, St Ethelbert's name was added to the parish church of St George in East Ham, Essex (now London), at the behest of Hereford Cathedral which had funded the rebuilding of the church, previously a temporary wooden structure.

== Sources ==
- Archibald, Marion M. (1985). "The Coinage of Beonna in the light of the Middle Harling Hoard" (PDF). British Numismatic Journal. 55. British Numismatic Society: 10–54. ISSN 0143-8956.
- Butler, L. A. S (1986). Butler, L. A. S; Morris, R. K. (eds.). "Church dedications and the cults of Anglo-Saxon saints in England" (PDF). The Anglo-Saxon Church (60). London: Council for British Archaeology Research Report: 44–50. Archived from the original (PDF) on 17 December 2010.
- Buckler, George (1856). Twenty-Two Of The Churches Of Essex: Architecturally Described And Illustrated. London: Bell and Daldy.
- Caldwell, John (2001). "St Ethelbert, King and Martyr: his cult and office in the West of England". Plainsong and Medieval Music. 10 (1). Cambridge University Press: 39–46. doi:10.1017/S0961137101000043. ISSN 0961-1371. S2CID 162245405.
- Cubitt, Catherine (2000). "Sites and Sanctity: Revisiting the Cult of Murdered and Martyred Anglo-Saxon Royal Saints". Early Medieval England. 9: 53–83. doi:10.1111/1468-0254.00059.
- Firth, Matthew (2020). "The Character of the Treacherous Woman in the passiones of Early Medieval English Royal Martyrs". Royal Studies Journal. 7: 1–21. doi:10.21039/rsj.188.
- Hutcheson, Andrew (2009). "Coinage in the East Anglian Landscape c. AD 749–939: from Beonna through to the Death of Athelstan" (PDF). The Origins of East Anglian Towns: Coin Loss in the Landscape, AD 470–939 (PhD). University of East Anglia.
- James, M. R. (1917). "Two Lives of St. Ethelbert, King and Martyr". The English Historical Review. 32: 214–244. doi:10.1093/ehr/XXXII.CXXVI.214.
- Kirby, D. P. (2000). The Earliest English Kings. London and New York: Routledge. ISBN 978-0-415-24211-0.
- Lapidge, Michael (1993). Anglo-Latin Literature 900–1066. London, UK: The Hambledon Press. ISBN 978-1-85285-012-8.
- Naismith, Rory (2014). "A new type for Æthelberht II of East Anglia" (PDF). British Numismatic Journal. 84. British Numismatic Society: 230–232. ISSN 0143-8956.
- Plunkett, S. J. (2005). Suffolk in Anglo-Saxon Times. Stroud: Tempus. ISBN 978-0-7524-3139-0.
- Swanton, Michael (1997). The Anglo-Saxon Chronicle. London: Routledge. ISBN 978-0-415-92129-9.
- Thacker, Alan (1985). "Kings, Saints, and Monasteries in Pre-Viking Mercia". Midland History. 10: 1–25. doi:10.1179/mdh.1985.10.1.1.
- Todd, Andy (2004). "Æthelberht [St Æthelberht, Ethelbert]". Oxford Dictionary of National Biography (online ed.). Oxford University Press. doi:10.1093/ref:odnb/8903. OCLC 56568095. (Subscription, Wikipedia Library access or UK public library membership required.)
- Warner, Peter (1996). The Origins of Suffolk. Manchester and New York: Manchester University Press. ISBN 978-0-7190-3817-4.
- Yorke, Barbara (2002). Kings and Kingdoms of Early Anglo-Saxon England. London and New York: Routledge. ISBN 978-0-415-16639-3.
- Zaluckyj, Sarah (2001). Mercia: The Anglo-Saxon Kingdom of Central Europe. Almeley: Logaston Press. ISBN 1873827628.

Preceded by Æthelred I	King of East Anglia	Succeeded by Offa of Mercia
