= Rory O'Moore =

Organizer of the Irish Rebellion of 1641

Sir Rory O'Moore (Irish: Ruaidhrí Ó Mórdha; c. 1600 – 16 February 1655), also known Sir Roger O'Moore or O'More or Sir Roger Moore, was an Irish landowner, and is most notable for being one of the four principal organisers of the Irish Rebellion of 1641.

Rory O’Moore

== Early life ==
O'Moore belonged to an ancient Irish noble family descended from Conall Cernach. He was born in either Laois around 1600, or more likely at Balyna, his father's estate in County Kildare, about 4km west of Johnstownbridge. His father was Calvagh O'More, son of nobleman Rory Caoch O'More, and his mother was Margaret Scurlock (Sherlock).

O'Moore's uncle Rory Oge O'More, Lord of Laois, had fought against the English during the Tudor conquest of Ireland. In 1556 Queen Mary I confiscated Clan O'Mores' lands and created "Queens County" (modern-day County Laois). Over 180 family members, who were peaceful and had taken no part in any rebellion, were murdered with virtually all of the leaders of Laois and Offaly by the English at a feast at Mullaghmast, County Kildare in 1577, Rory Óg and his wife Maighréad O'Byrne, sister of Fiach MacHugh O'Byrne, were hunted down and killed soon afterwards. This led to the political downfall of the O'Moore family; their estates in Laois were given to English settlers.

In contrast, Rory's father Callough/Calvagh, a lawyer, was granted his estate at Balyna near Carbury, County Kildare in 1574 by Elizabeth I. His descendants sold it in 1961, and it is now a popular hotel.

== Leader of the Rebellion of 1641 ==
Given the causes of the rebellion and the Crown's weakness during the Bishops' Wars into 1641, O'More planned a bloodless coup to overthrow the English government in Ireland.

On 5th October 1641 he met at Loughross with Connor Maguire, 2nd Baron of Enniskillen, Heber McMahon then the Vicar of Clougher, Sir Phelim O'Neill and Captain Turlough O'Neill. They planned to seize Dublin Castle, that was held by a small garrison, on 23 October 1641. Allies in Ulster led by Sir Phelim O'Neill would seize forts and towns there. The leaders would then assume the governing of their own country and with this provision offer allegiance to King Charles. They were betrayed, and the plan was discovered on 22 October and the rising failed in its first objective. O'Neill had some success in Ulster, and O'More quickly succeeded in creating for the first time a military alliance between the Ulster Gaelic clans and the Old English gentry in the Pale of Leinster.

This alliance was arranged at a meeting on 15 December 1641 at Knocklofty, near Duleek, between O'Moore and Lords Gormanston, Fingall, Slane and Dunsany who were prominent in County Meath.

In November 1641 the Irish forces besieged Drogheda and a royalist force came north from Dublin to oppose them. O'More was one of the leaders of the rebel army that intercepted and defeated the relief force at the Battle of Julianstown on 29 November. The Kildare rebels did not stop the occupation of Naas by a royalist force in February 1642, and then in April they lost the Battle of Kilrush. By the stage O'Moore was more of a politician in the evolving management of Confederate Ireland that lasted for another decade.

In the ensuing Irish Confederate Wars, a major achievement by O’Moore was to recruit Owen Roe O'Neill from the Spanish service in 1642. He commanded the Confederate forces in what is now County Laois and County Offaly, which remained peaceful, and helped arrange alliances with Inchiquin in 1647 and Ormonde in 1648. The resulting larger alliance failed to stop the Cromwellian invasion of Ireland (1649–53), by the end of which an estimated one-third of the Irish population had died.

The Irish historian Charles Gavan Duffy wrote:

Then a private gentleman, with no resources beyond his intellect and his courage, this Rory, when Ireland was weakened by defeat and confiscation, and guarded with a jealous care constantly increasing in strictness and severity, conceived the vast design of rescuing the country from England, and even accomplished it; for, in three years, England did not retain a city in Ireland but Dublin and Drogheda, and for eight years the land was possessed and the supreme authority exercised by the Confederation created by O'Moore. History contains no stricter instance of the influence of an individual mind.

Gavan Duffy's comment about "no resources" ignored that O'Moore owned over 3,000 acres (1,235 Ha.) of land in Carbury barony, and his other great importance in 1641 was his descent from prominent families of Gaelic and Old English ancestry.

== Final years ==
Bishop Michael Comerford wrote that after O'More's defeat at the Battle of Kilrush in April 1642 he retired and died in Kilkenny city in the winter of 1642–43, having co-founded the Irish Catholic Confederation there a few months earlier. However this ignores his contacts with Inchiquin and Ormonde in 1647–48. Others say that he fled to the island of Inishbofin, County Galway after Galway city fell in 1652. St Colman's Church on the island once bore a tablet with the inscription:

In memory of many valiant Irishmen who were exiled to this Holy Island and in particular Rory O'More a brave chieftain of Leix, who after fighting for Faith and Fatherland, disguised as a fisherman escaped from his island to a place of safety. He died shortly afterwards, a martyr to his Religion and his County, about 1653. He was esteemed and loved by his countrymen, who celebrated his many deeds of valour and kindness in their songs and reverenced his memory, so that it was a common expression among them; "God and Our Lady be our help and Rory O'More".

Comerford quoted earlier historians who wrote that a similar watchword in Kildare was: "Our trust is in God and Our Lady, and Rory O'More".

== Family ==
O'More married Jane, daughter of Sir Patrick Barnewall, of Donabate, County Dublin and his second wife Mary Bagenal, and they had two sons and four daughters.

The Balyna estate was inherited from Calvagh O'More by Rory's brother Lewis. Balyna was passed down to Lewis' last surviving O'More descendant, Letitia, who was also descended from Rory O'More because her grandfather married a second cousin. Letitia married a Richard Farrell in 1751: this Farrell family henceforth took the surname More O'Ferrall. Prominent members included Richard More O'Ferrall.

His daughter Anne, married Patrick Sarsfield from an Old English Catholic family from The Pale. His grandsons included Patrick Sarsfield, 1st Earl of Lucan, who led a Jacobite force in the Williamite War in Ireland, and his brother William Sarsfield, whose descendants include all the Earls of Lucan and the 4th and all subsequent Earls Spencer, through which Rory is an ancestor to Diana, Princess of Wales.

Following the Irish War of Independence, the 1861 "Victoria & Albert Bridge" across the River Liffey in Dublin, was renamed the Rory O'More Bridge in honour of him.

== Family tree ==
Family tree of the Irish O'More clan

Murtagh O’More; Lord of Laois
Conn O’More fl. 1520	Conall O'More died 1537; Lord of Laois, 1523-1537	Gormflaith O'Carroll	Peter O'More; Lord of Laois, 1537-1538
Lysaght O'More died 1537; Lord of Slemargy	Kedagh Ruadh O'More died 1542; Lord of Laois, 1538-1542	Margaret Butler; Daughter of Thomas Butler	Rory Caoch O'More c. 1515 - 1547; Lord of Laois, 1542-1547	O'Dunne; Daughter of Tadhg O'Dunne	Giolla Pádraig O'More died 1548; Lord of Laois, 1547-1548	Conall Oge O'More died 1557; Lord of Laois, 1548-1557
James O'More; Lord of Laois, 1578	Domhnall MacLysaght O'More died 1557; Lord of Slemargy, 1557	Murtagh O’More died 1577; Lord of Slemargy, 1557-1577	Kedagh O'More fl. 1565	Lysaght O'More died 1570	Rory Oge O'More c. 1544 - 1578; Lord of Laois, 1557-1578	Margaret O'Byrne died 1577	Calvagh O'More; 1540 - 1618
Richard Tyrrell fl. 1565 - 1632	Doryne O'More	Owny MacRory O'More c. 1575 - 1600; Lord of Laois, 1594 - 1600	Fiach O’More	Remainn O'More fl. 1600-1601	Rory O'Moore c. 1600 - 1655
Owen O'Shiel; 1584-1650	Catherine Tyrrell fl. 1648	Richard Tyrrell Jr	Annabel Tyrrell	Elish Tyrrell

Sources

- Annals of the Four Masters
- Dictionary of Irish Biography (October 2009)
- Ó Raghallaigh, Eoghan (2010). "A poem to Rudhraighe Caoch Ó Mórdha, lord of Laois 1542-7" (PDF). Ossory, Laois and Leinster. 4.
- Dictionary of National Biography
- "The Church in Ireland During the Reigns of Henry VIII and Edward VI (1509-1553) @ ELCore.Net". 7 June 2010.
- "Combs &c. Families of County Laois, Ireland". combs-families.org.
- "Rory O Moore Genealogy". Archived from the original on 7 April 2011.
- Heitzler, Michael James (2005). Goose Creek, A Definitive History: Volume One, Planters, Politicians and Patriots. The History Press. p. 275. ISBN 978-1-59629-055-6. Retrieved 8 October 2011.
- Thaddeus Dowling. "Annales Breves Hiberniae".

== Depiction in film ==
The film Rory O'More, made by the Kalem Company in 1911, directed by Sidney Olcott and Robert G. Vignola, set O'More's rebellion in 1798 rather than the 17th century, and moved the action to the Lakes of Killarney. O'More is portrayed in the film by Jack J. Clark.
