= Owny MacRory O'More =

Irish chieftain and rebel

Owny MacRory O’More Uaithne mac Ruairí Ó Mórdha
- Lord of Laois
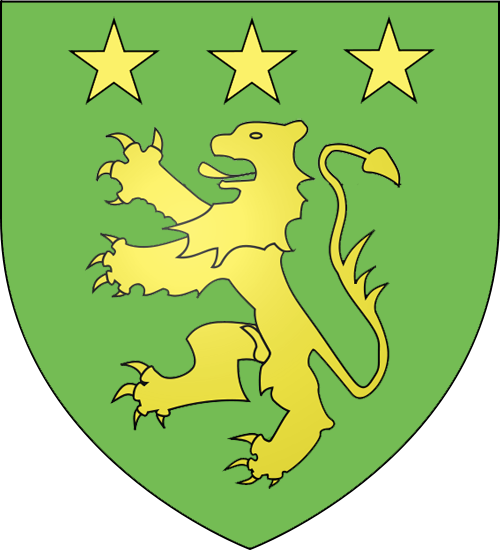
- Coat of arms
- Tenure: 1594 - 1600
- Predecessor: James O'More
- Successor: Owny MacShane O'More
- Born: c. 1575; Leinster, Ireland
- Died: 11-17 August 1600 (aged ~25); Near Vicarstown, Queen's County, Ireland
- Father: Rory O'More
- Mother: Margaret O’Byrne

Owny MacRory O’More (Irish: Uaithne mac Ruairí Ó Mórdha; c. 1575 - August 1600) was an Irish chieftain and rebel.

The son of clan chief Rory O'More, he was brought up in County Wicklow by his maternal uncle Fiach O'Byrne. He succeeded as The O'More around 1594, and notably won 1599's Pass of the Plumes against the 2nd Earl of Essex. Considered the "last great Lord of Laois", O'More's death in 1600 marked the end of the O'Mores as one of the most important Irish clans.

== Early life ==
Born around 1575, O'More was the son of Rory Oge O'More, Lord of Laois, and Margaret O’Byrne, daughter of Hugh McSeán O'Byrne. He had six full-siblings, which include Fiach, Remainn (fellow rebels) and Doryne, who later married Captain Richard Tyrrell. He also had at least four half-brothers.

In 1556, Queen Mary I had approved the Settlement of Laois and Offaly Act, which shired Laois and Uí Failghe (now Offaly), renaming them Queen's County and King's County respectively. This dispossessed the rest of Clan O'More and started the Plantations of Ireland.

In 1578, Rory was killed by troops led by loyalist Barnaby Fitzpatrick, 2nd Baron Upper Ossory. After Rory's death, his friend John Burke, son of the Earl of Clanricarde, took charge of Owny O'More.

O'More and Doryne were brought up in Glenmalure, territory of the O'Byrne clan, under the protection of their uncle Fiach McHugh O'Byrne. O'More's upbringing was turbulent and surrounded by the conflict of the Tudor conquest of Ireland - in 1582, two of his half-brothers were publicly executed at Dublin for their involvement in the Leinster conflict.

O'Byrne took him under his wing, training him in the arts of politics and warfare. He anticipated the young O'More's eventual return to Laois to claim his family's lordship. Owny O'More became Lord of Laois around 1594. He may have succeeded his father's cousin, James.

== Rebellion ==
On 15 August 1594, Queen Elizabeth I reintroduced martial law throughout Leinster to suppress O'Byrne. In response, O'Byrne dispatched his teenaged nephew, supervised by his ally Piers Grace, to terrorise the Irish midlands. By June the next year, O'More had received his uncle's orders to stand down - however they continued their carnage in early 1596.

The English captured O'More after some difficulty, and eventually allowed him to return to Ireland. Upon returning he became "as great a rebel as his father", recovering almost all Laois. The Annals of the Four Masters records O'More's rebellious actions of 1596:

[Owny O'More] was at this time a gentleman skilled in the arts of war; and Leix was totally ravaged by him, both its crops, corn, and dwellings, so that there was nothing in the territory outside the lock of a gate or a bawn which was not in his power. He slew a gentleman of the English, who was seated at Stradbally-Leix, who possessed a large portion of the territory by authority of the Sovereign, namely, Alexander Cosby, the son of Master Frauus.

On 7 December 1597, O'More and his allies Tyrrell and Nugent killed Walter Hovenden in battle, defeating his troops. Ironically, Hovenden was the foster-brother of the Irish confederacy leader Hugh O'Neill.

Upon 1598's Battle of the Yellow Ford and O'More's Leinster Irish irruption into Munster, Lord President of Munster Thomas Norris concentrated his forces to the neighbourhood of Mallow; but not feeling sufficiently strong to encounter O'More, he withdrew to Cork.

=== Pass of the Plumes ===
One of O'More's most significant battles, the Pass of the Plumes, took place on 17 May 1599 against Lord Deputy Robert Devereux, 2nd Earl of Essex. It was named this because O'More's men captured many feathered helmets of the English soldiers.

Essex set out from Dublin on 9 May to muster his army in the Curragh. He took the castle of Athy, and was harried by O'More's men as he passed beyond the Pale. He relieved the fort of Maryborough, headed towards the pass of Cashel in Queens County. The pass was wooded and boggy, with a plashed trench at either end. At the head of Essex's advance were 40 shot and 20 swordsmen. In the face of rebel resistance, the calivermen moved to point blank range and the swordsmen jumped into the trenches on the flanks; the vanguard moved through the calivermen in a frontal assault and pressed through to open country, where they halted until the whole column had joined them. Essex was said to have flown like lightning between the vanguard, battle, and rearguard. The English admitted to the loss of three officers and several men although the Irish claimed 500 were killed.

According to Geoffrey Keating's History of Ireland, "in the year 1599, Owny MacRory O'More cut off a great number of the troops of the Earl of Essex, in a defile in their progress through Leinster, at a place called from that circumstance Bearna-Cleitigh, signifying the Pass of Plumes, from the great quantity of plumes left there, which were worn in the helmets of the English knights who were slain."

== Death ==
In mid-August 1600, O'More and his men advanced towards Maryborough. He was shot and killed by Baron Mountjoy's soldiers in a skirmish on the borders of Queen's County. Sources differ on the exact location - either near Timahoe or Vicarstown. According to writer Philip O'Sullivan Beare, O'More "incautiously advanced with one comrade beyond his own troops [and] was struck by a leaden bullet."

== Legacy ==
Upon his death, almost all of O'More's men lost their fighting spirit - only his brother Remainn continued to fight before surrendering in 1601. According to Archbold, Owny's death meant the O'More clan was doomed. Laois was seized by the English, "for there was no heir worthy of it like Owny, to defend it against them". He was succeeded as Lord of Laois by Owny MacShane O’More.

English travel writer Fynes Moryson called O'More "a bloody and bold young man", and the Annals of the Four Masters called him an "illustrious, renowned, and celebrated gentleman".

O'More seems to have died without any sons or daughters.

His first cousin, born around the time of his death, was Rory O'Moore, a principal organiser of the Irish Rebellion of 1641.

== Family tree ==
Family tree of the Irish O'More clan

Murtagh O’More; Lord of Laois
Conn O’More fl. 1520	Conall O'More died 1537; Lord of Laois, 1523-1537	Gormflaith O'Carroll	Peter O'More; Lord of Laois, 1537-1538
Lysaght O'More died 1537; Lord of Slemargy	Kedagh Ruadh O'More died 1542; Lord of Laois, 1538-1542	Margaret Butler; Daughter of Thomas Butler	Rory Caoch O'More c. 1515 - 1547; Lord of Laois, 1542-1547	O'Dunne; Daughter of Tadhg O'Dunne	Giolla Pádraig O'More died 1548; Lord of Laois, 1547-1548	Conall Oge O'More died 1557; Lord of Laois, 1548-1557
James O'More; Lord of Laois, 1578	Domhnall MacLysaght O'More died 1557; Lord of Slemargy, 1557	Murtagh O’More died 1577; Lord of Slemargy, 1557-1577	Kedagh O'More fl. 1565	Lysaght O'More died 1570	Rory Oge O'More c. 1544 - 1578; Lord of Laois, 1557-1578	Margaret O'Byrne died 1577	Calvagh O'More; 1540 - 1618
Richard Tyrrell fl. 1565 - 1632	Doryne O'More	Owny MacRory O'More c. 1575 - 1600; Lord of Laois, 1594 - 1600	Fiach O’More	Remainn O'More fl. 1600-1601	Rory O'Moore c. 1600 - 1655
Owen O'Shiel; 1584-1650	Catherine Tyrrell fl. 1648	Richard Tyrrell Jr	Annabel Tyrrell	Elish Tyrrell

Sources

- Annals of the Four Masters
- Dictionary of Irish Biography (October 2009)
- Ó Raghallaigh, Eoghan (2010). "A poem to Rudhraighe Caoch Ó Mórdha, lord of Laois 1542-7" (PDF). Ossory, Laois and Leinster. 4.
- Dictionary of National Biography
- "The Church in Ireland During the Reigns of Henry VIII and Edward VI (1509-1553) @ ELCore.Net". 7 June 2010.
- "Combs &c. Families of County Laois, Ireland". combs-families.org.
- "Rory O Moore Genealogy". Archived from the original on 2011-04-07.
- Heitzler, Michael James (2005). Goose Creek, A Definitive History: Volume One, Planters, Politicians and Patriots. The History Press. p. 275. ISBN 978-1-59629-055-6. Retrieved 8 October 2011.
- Thaddeus Dowling. "Annales Breves Hiberniae".
