= Rory O'Moore (disambiguation) =

Rory O'Moore (c. 1600–1655) was a leader of the 1641 Rebellion.

Rory O'Moore may refer to:

- Rory O'More (c. 1544–1578), Irish rebel
- Rory Caoch O'More (died 1547), Irish noble
- Rory O'Moore, namesake of the O'Moore Medal
- Rory O'More Bridge, a road bridge spanning the River Liffey in Dublin, Ireland
- Rory O'More (film), a 1911 American silent film
