= Rory Caoch O'More =

Irish noble (died 1547)

Rory Caoch O'More Ruaidhrí Caoch Ó Mórdha
- Lord of Laois
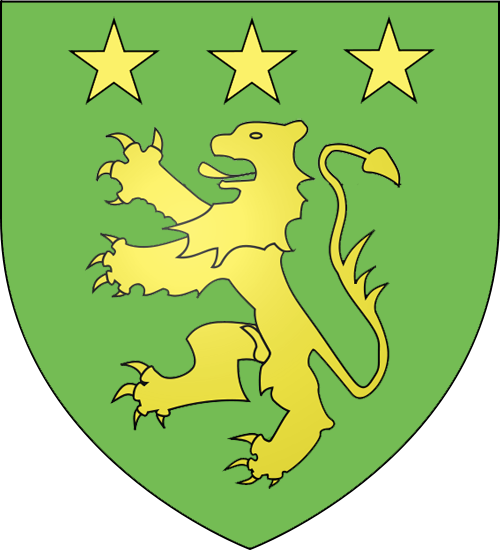
- Coat of arms
- Tenure: 1542-1547
- Predecessor: Kedagh O'More
- Successor: Giolla Pádraig O'More
- Born: c. 1515; Ireland
- Died: 1547; Ireland
- Spouses: O'Dunne; Margaret Butler
- Issue: Rory Oge O'More; Calvagh O'More

Rory Caoch O'More (Irish: Ruaidhrí Caoch Ó Mórdha; c. 1515 – 1547) was an Irish noble. He ruled as Lord of Laois until his death in 1547 at the hand of his brother Giolla Pádraig O'More.

== Early life ==
Born about 1515, O'More was the son of Connell O'More (d. 1537) and Gormflaith O'Carroll. His brothers were Lysaght, Kedagh, Giolla Pádraig and Conall.

According to historian William Arthur Jobson Archbold, O'More "early acquired the character of a violent and successful chieftain." O'More's first wife was the daughter of Tadhg O'Dunne.

In October 1537, O'More was subpoenaed to the king's court in Kilkenny to give evidence. He irreverently tossed the writ into mud and stepped on it, much to the dismay of the official who delivered it.

== Power struggle ==
Upon Connell's death in 1537, a dispute broke out between Rory, Lysaght, Kedagh, and their uncle Peter, who was the Tanist in line to head the family. Peter seized the title with the support of Piers Butler, 1st Earl of Ossory. The three brothers refused to accept Peter's lordship, and led by Lysaght (the eldest brother and Lord of Slemargy), they declared war in late 1537.

Peter O'More was for the time a friend of the Butlers - consequently, Lord Deputy Leonard Grey supported Connell's sons. Lysaght was killed by the gallowglass in 1537. Kedagh and Rory continued fighting against Peter.

On 14 January 1538, Grey negotiated a peace between Rory, Kedagh and Peter. This was short-lived, and Grey later encouraged the brothers to attack Peter. In June 1538, in the presence of the local army commander, Rory attempted to kill Peter at Athy, County Kildare. The commander arrested Peter for his own safety.

Once again, Grey assembled a meeting in Dublin between the brothers and their uncle. This was all a ruse - Grey imprisoned Peter and led him about in chains for some time. He allowed Kedagh and Rory to return to Laois and resume their attacks. Peter was eventually released in August 1538, still the Lord of Laois.

Kedagh secured the chieftainship that year, and the two brothers exiled Peter from Laois.

== O'More vs O'Connor ==
In the early 1540s, Rory O'More's brother Giolla Pádraig set about his plan to seize the lordship of Laois. He entered an alliance with Rory's rival, Brian O'Connor Faly, by marrying O'Connor Faly's daughter.

Giolla Pádraig and O'Connor Faly were favoured by the new Lord Deputy, Anthony St Leger. In September 1540, St Leger forced the submission of the O'More brothers. Kedagh and Rory attempted to garner goodwill from St Leger and they were pardoned on 27 June 1541.

In 1542, Kedagh was killed in Carlow by Gaelic warlord Domhnall MacMurrough Kavanagh. Rory succeeded him via election.

== Lordship ==
On 13 May 1542, he took part in the surrender and regrant process, under the anglicised name "Rory O'More of Lex".

O'More responded to Giolla Pádraig's hostility by allying with James Butler, 9th Earl of Ormond; he married Margaret Butler, the Earl's niece, between 1543 and 1544.

St Leger forced O'More and his brother to submit to the authorities, bringing them to Dublin in hopes of stopping their bloodshed. In O'More's absence, O'Connor Faly devastated Laois, and St Leger detained O'More in his attempts to leave Dublin. O'More wrote to Henry VIII, accusing St Leger of favouritism.

== Death ==
In 1547, O'More faced another revolt from his brother Giolla Pádraig. O'More was initially successful and forced Giolla Pádraig to retreat. However, Giolla Pádraig returned with O'Connor Faly's troops, and O'More was killed during the attack.

== Legacy ==
O'More had three recorded sons, including Calvagh O'More and Rory Oge O'More. Upon his death, his widow Margaret apparently left Ireland with his young sons.

Giolla Pádraig seized the lordship of Laois. He died around 1548 in the Marshalsea, and the lordship passed to his brother Conall Óg O'More, then finally Rory Oge O'More.

Rory Caoch O'More's brother Kedagh left a son, who, in 1565, petitioned the privy council in Dublin to be restored to his father's inheritance. In a grant afterwards made to his eldest son, his services to King Edward VI are spoken of; but an order of 15 March 1550-1 forbade any of the name of O'More to hold land in Laois.

Through his son Calvagh, O'More is a direct ancestor of Diana, Princess of Wales and, by extension, her son William. The prominent Moore family of Carolina in the United States supposedly claimed patrilineal descent from Rory Caoch O'More through his grandson of the same name, though in actuality they were descended from an English family in Devonshire.

== Family tree ==
Family tree of the Irish O'More clan

Murtagh O’More; Lord of Laois
Conn O’More fl. 1520	Conall O'More died 1537; Lord of Laois, 1523-1537	Gormflaith O'Carroll	Peter O'More; Lord of Laois, 1537-1538
Lysaght O'More died 1537; Lord of Slemargy	Kedagh Ruadh O'More died 1542; Lord of Laois, 1538-1542	Margaret Butler; Daughter of Thomas Butler	Rory Caoch O'More c. 1515 - 1547; Lord of Laois, 1542-1547	O'Dunne; Daughter of Tadhg O'Dunne	Giolla Pádraig O'More died 1548; Lord of Laois, 1547-1548	Conall Oge O'More died 1557; Lord of Laois, 1548-1557
James O'More; Lord of Laois, 1578	Domhnall MacLysaght O'More died 1557; Lord of Slemargy, 1557	Murtagh O’More died 1577; Lord of Slemargy, 1557-1577	Kedagh O'More fl. 1565	Lysaght O'More died 1570	Rory Oge O'More c. 1544 - 1578; Lord of Laois, 1557-1578	Margaret O'Byrne died 1577	Calvagh O'More; 1540 - 1618
Richard Tyrrell fl. 1565 - 1632	Doryne O'More	Owny MacRory O'More c. 1575 - 1600; Lord of Laois, 1594 - 1600	Fiach O’More	Remainn O'More fl. 1600-1601	Rory O'Moore c. 1600 - 1655
Owen O'Shiel; 1584-1650	Catherine Tyrrell fl. 1648	Richard Tyrrell Jr	Annabel Tyrrell	Elish Tyrrell

Sources

- Annals of the Four Masters
- Dictionary of Irish Biography (October 2009)
- Ó Raghallaigh, Eoghan (2010). "A poem to Rudhraighe Caoch Ó Mórdha, lord of Laois 1542-7" (PDF). Ossory, Laois and Leinster. 4.
- Dictionary of National Biography
- "The Church in Ireland During the Reigns of Henry VIII and Edward VI (1509-1553) @ ELCore.Net". 7 June 2010.
- "Combs &c. Families of County Laois, Ireland". combs-families.org.
- "Rory O Moore Genealogy". Archived from the original on 7 April 2011.
- Heitzler, Michael James (2005). Goose Creek, A Definitive History: Volume One, Planters, Politicians and Patriots. The History Press. p. 275. ISBN 978-1-59629-055-6. Retrieved 8 October 2011.
- Thaddeus Dowling. "Annales Breves Hiberniae".
