= Calvagh O'More =

Irish-born landowner (1540–1618)

Calvagh O'More An Calbhach Ó Mórdha
- Born: 1540; Portlaoise, County Laois, Ireland
- Died: March 27, 1618 (aged 77–78); Balyna, County Kildare, Ireland
- Other names: Callagh; The Calough; Charles
- Parents: Rory Caoch O'More (father); Margaret Butler (mother)

Calvagh O'More (Irish: An Calbhach Ó Mórdha; 1540 – 27 March 1618), also known as Callagh, The Calough or Charles, was an Irish-born landowner of noble ancestry.

He was raised in England. Upon returning to Ireland in his early thirties, he was granted an estate in Balyna by the Crown, which was owned by his descendants until 1960.

His brother and father were Irish chiefs - the Lord of Laois - and his son Rory O'Moore was a leader of the Irish Rebellion of 1641.

== Early life ==
Calvagh O'More was born in 1540 in Portlaoise, Laois. His father was Rory Caoch O'More, Irish chief and Lord of Laois, and his mother was Margaret Butler, granddaughter of Piers Butler, 8th Earl of Ormond.

Upon Rory's death at the hands of his brother Giolla Pádraig, it seems that Margaret removed Calvagh and his siblings from Laois.

== Time in England ==
O'More was brought up in England, and was called 'The Calough' by the English. As he describes himself as of Gray's Inn in 1568, he may be the John Callow who entered there in 1567.

His loyalist tendencies were in stark contrast to his brother Rory Oge O'More, a staunch rebel who became Lord of Laois in 1557, and returned to Ireland in the 1560s to lead his clan against the Tudor army.

== Return to Ireland ==
In 1571, Thomas Butler, 10th Earl of Ormond petitioned for Calvagh O'More's return. Soon afterwards O'More came back to Ireland, and in 1574, was granted an estate at Balyna, near Moyvalley, County Kildare. The estate was granted by Elizabeth I in an attempt to stop the ongoing violence between the Tudors and O'More's brother Rory.

In 1582, O'More was thought to be a sufficiently strong adherent to the English to receive a grant of land in Laois. He also possessed part of the ancestral property of Owen Roe O'Neill in County Armagh, and received grants of land in Meath and Dublin.

In 1585, Sir Thomas FitzGerald of Laccagh posted bond for O'More, referencing his "good conduct [and] appearance when called for."

== Personal life ==
O'More married Margaret Scurlock. Their son Rory was born about 1600, either in Laois, or more likely at the Balyna estate. Another son was named Lewis.

== Death and legacy ==
On 27 March 1618, O'More died in Balyna. His son Lewis inherited his Balyna estate, and it remained in the ownership of the O'More family until it was sold in 1960.

O'More's son Rory went on to become one of the principal organisers of the Irish Rebellion of 1641. Through Rory, O'More is a direct ancestor of Diana, Princess of Wales and, by extension, her son William.

== Family tree ==
Family tree of the Irish O'More clan

Murtagh O’More; Lord of Laois
Conn O’More fl. 1520	Conall O'More died 1537; Lord of Laois, 1523-1537	Gormflaith O'Carroll	Peter O'More; Lord of Laois, 1537-1538
Lysaght O'More died 1537; Lord of Slemargy	Kedagh Ruadh O'More died 1542; Lord of Laois, 1538-1542	Margaret Butler; Daughter of Thomas Butler	Rory Caoch O'More c. 1515 - 1547; Lord of Laois, 1542-1547	O'Dunne; Daughter of Tadhg O'Dunne	Giolla Pádraig O'More died 1548; Lord of Laois, 1547-1548	Conall Oge O'More died 1557; Lord of Laois, 1548-1557
James O'More; Lord of Laois, 1578	Domhnall MacLysaght O'More died 1557; Lord of Slemargy, 1557	Murtagh O’More died 1577; Lord of Slemargy, 1557-1577	Kedagh O'More fl. 1565	Lysaght O'More died 1570	Rory Oge O'More c. 1544 - 1578; Lord of Laois, 1557-1578	Margaret O'Byrne died 1577	Calvagh O'More; 1540 - 1618
Richard Tyrrell fl. 1565 - 1632	Doryne O'More	Owny MacRory O'More c. 1575 - 1600; Lord of Laois, 1594 - 1600	Fiach O’More	Remainn O'More fl. 1600-1601	Rory O'Moore c. 1600 - 1655
Owen O'Shiel; 1584-1650	Catherine Tyrrell fl. 1648	Richard Tyrrell Jr	Annabel Tyrrell	Elish Tyrrell

Sources

- Annals of the Four Masters
- Dictionary of Irish Biography (October 2009)
- Ó Raghallaigh, Eoghan (2010). "A poem to Rudhraighe Caoch Ó Mórdha, lord of Laois 1542-7" (PDF). Ossory, Laois and Leinster. 4.
- Dictionary of National Biography
- "The Church in Ireland During the Reigns of Henry VIII and Edward VI (1509-1553) @ ELCore.Net". 7 June 2010.
- "Combs &c. Families of County Laois, Ireland". combs-families.org.
- http://clannmuironline.ning.com/forum/topics/rory-o-moore-genealogy
- Heitzler, Michael James (2005). Goose Creek, A Definitive History: Volume One, Planters, Politicians and Patriots. The History Press. p. 275. ISBN 978-1-59629-055-6. Retrieved 8 October 2011.
- https://celt.ucc.ie/published/L100012/text001.html
