= Cathal O'Connor Faly =

Irish rebel (c. 1540 – 1596)

Cathal O'Connor Faly Cathal Ó Conchobhair Failghe
- Born: c. 1540; Leinster, Ireland
- Died: October 1596 (aged about 56); Corcubión, Galicia, Crown of Castile
- Other names: Charles; Don Carlos; Don Carolo
- Parents: Brian O'Connor Faly (father); Mary FitzGerald (mother)
- Family: O'Connor dynasty FitzGerald family

Cathal O'Connor Faly (Irish: Cathal Ó Conchobhair Failghe; c. 1540 – October 1596) was an Irish rebel of noble ancestry.

As a young man, O'Connor Faly was a political spy for Catholics in Great Britain. He became a rebel and killed English soldier Henry Mackworth before escaping to Spain in the 1580s, where he joined the Spanish Armada. Known by the Spanish as Don Carlos, he died in a shipwreck on the 2nd Armada.

His claim to the lordship of Offaly (Irish: Uí Failghe) was recognised by the Spanish, but not by the English.

== Early life and career ==
Cathal O'Connor Faly (Note: Anglicisations of his forename include Cathal, Caell, Cahill and Cahil, as well as Charles. O'Connor has also been anglicised O'Conor and O'Conogher.) was born about 1540 into the O'Connor family, specifically the O'Connor Faly branch of the Kingdom of Uí Failghe. The suffix Faly (Irish: Failghe) is used to distinguish them from other O'Connor families. During O'Connor Faly's youth, lands in Uí Failghe were confiscated, shired and renamed to King's County (modern-day County Offaly).

His father was Brian O'Connor Faly, Baron Offaly, and his mother was Lady Mary FitzGerald, daughter of the 9th Earl of Kildare. He had seven brothers—Cormack, Donough, Rory, Teige, Callough, Arte and Rosse. He was also a foster-brother of Richard Tyrrell, who went on to command confederate troops at the Siege of Kinsale. O'Connor Faly's family were traditionally the rulers of Uí Failghe. The Crown created the title Baron Offaly in the Irish peerage for O'Connor Faly's father Brian, but forfeited it in 1550 over Brian's insubordination.

O'Connor Faly was taken to Scotland as a child. In 1560, he accompanied representative Henri Cleutin to France, and appealed to Catholic Englishman Francis Throckmorton to intercede for his pardon. On Throckmorton's advice, O'Connor Faly became a spy in the service of Mary, Queen of Scots. In 1563, he obtained a grant of Castle Brackland and other lands in King's County.

== Rebellion ==
O'Connor Faly was involved in the Desmond Rebellions, led by James FitzMaurice FitzGerald and the Earl of Desmond. In response to the massacre of Mullaghmast led by Francis Cosby, who killed over 100 Gaelic nobles, the enraged O'Connor Faly began to carry out attacks against English forces. In April 1582, he killed Pallas man Donnell McTibbott O'Molloy in a fight, and killed forty-five of his men. O'Connor Faly also burned Sir Edward Harbert's residence in Durrow Abbey, King's County.

In May 1582, O'Connor Faly and his followers ambushed and captured English Captain Henry (or Humfrey) Mackworth. They met Mackworth at Rosbrye, County Kildare, where he was returning from Dublin to Philipstown, under the pretence of parleying with Mackworth. Instead, the group captured him and carried him off to the woods. Lord Deputy Arthur Grey ordered Henry Warren, sheriff of King's County, to command O'Connor Faly to release Mackworth. O'Connor Faly refused, unless his safety could be granted via royal pardon from Elizabeth I. Robert Dunlop stated that when the administration refused, O'Connor Faly had Mackworth put to death. Philip O'Sullivan Beare detailed an account in his Historiae Catholicae Iberniae. (Note: O'Sullivan Beare refers to Mackworth as "MacFort".) A day was arranged for Mackworth to produce the pardon. On the day, as agreed, he arrived on horseback and O'Connor Faly arrived on foot with his ally Conal MacGeoghegan. During their parley, Mackworth frequently showed the two men a parchment but refused to let them read it. He began to leave, but O'Connor Faly sprang from the high ground, grabbed him around the neck and dragged him off his saddle to the ground. Mackworth put the parchment in his mouth and started to swallow, to stop O'Connor Faly and MacGeoghegan from reading it. The men pried his jaws open with their hands, and upon reading the parchment, O'Connor Faly discovered it was an order from the Queen for Mackworth to capture and kill him. O'Connor Faly and MacGeoghegan killed Mackworth for his deception.

In response to Mackworth's murder, Grey went to war against O'Connor Faly. The rebel and his followers dispersed themselves among the wilderness of Kildare to escape Grey's incoming forces; they planned to remain hidden until winter for a better chance of retaliation. Eventually, the majority of O'Connor Faly's men submitted and received pardons. Only O'Connor Faly, who had no chance of a pardon, continued resisting and eluded every attempt by the garrison at Philipstown to apprehend him.

== Exile and death ==
O'Connor Faly subsequently fled to Scotland in a pinnace; then, disguised as a sailor, he stowed away on a Scottish vessel to Spain. He joined the Spanish Armada under the Duke of Parma in the Spanish Netherlands. After the Armada's defeat, he returned to Spain. By 1588, he was known as Don Carlos (Carlos being the Spanish variation of Cathal). (Note: He was also known as Don Carolo and Don Carolos.) He is not to be confused with Carlos, Prince of Asturias (Philip II of Spain's son commonly known as Don Carlos).

In 1595, O'Connor Faly was in Lisbon, and he received a pension of thirty crowns per month from Philip II. He claimed the lordship of Offaly, which was recognised by the Spanish, but not by the English. During this time he regularly corresponded with Hugh O'Neill, Earl of Tyrone, leader of the Irish confederacy during the Nine Years' War. Tyrone sought military reinforcements from Philip II, and he feigned reconciliation with English authorities to buy time for the arrival of Spanish troops. Tyrone submitted a letter from Philip II to Lord Deputy William Russell as a show of transparency. Philip II soon learned of Tyrone's maneuver and was indignant at this breach of trust. O'Connor Faly assisted Tyrone by tempering the subsequently tense Spanish-Irish relations.

In January 1596, the English Crown received a report that 17 ships were set to take 12,000 Spanish soldiers through St George's Channel to Lambay Island, Ireland. O'Connor Faly and Cornelius O'Mulrian, Bishop of Killaloe, would be on board.

In late October 1596, O'Connor Faly embarked the 2nd Spanish Armada at Lisbon with his mother, wife, and children, intending to sail back to Ireland. A storm occurred off Cape Finisterre, and the vessel - the Sonday - perished in a shipwreck at the port of Corcubión, Galicia. O'Connor Faly and his family drowned. Reports of his death reached the English by November.

== See also ==
- Giolla Pádraig O'More (died 1548), ally of his father Brian O'Connor Faly
