= Follow Me up to Carlow =

Irish folk song

"Follow Me Up to Carlow" is an Irish folk song which celebrates the battle of Glenmalure, a 1580 engagement of the Second Desmond Rebellion which saw an army of 700 rebels under Fiach McHugh O'Byrne rout 2,000 English and Irish troops under Arthur Grey, 14th Baron Grey de Wilton.

== Composition ==
The air is reputed to have been played as a marching tune by the pipers of Fiach MacHugh O'Byrne in 1580.

The words were written by Patrick Joseph McCall (1861–1919) and appear in his Songs of Erinn (1899) under the title "Marching Song of Feagh MacHugh".

=== Characters mentioned ===
- Brian Mac Cahir Óg Kavanagh, Fiach's brother-in-law (as "MacCahir Óg")
- Queen Elizabeth I of England ("Queen Liza")
- William FitzWilliam, Lord Deputy of Ireland
- Baron Arthur Grey
- Fiach McHugh O'Byrne
- Sir Pierce (or Piers) Fitzgerald, High Sheriff of Kildare (as "Lord Kildare")
- Rory Óg O'More

== Performances ==
The song performed by Christoph Nolte.

It has been performed by numerous Irish folk bands, including Planxty and Wolfe Tones.

== See also ==
- O'Donnell Abu
