= Giolla Pádraig O'More (died 1548) =

Irish noble (died 1548)

Giolla Pádraig O'More Giolla Pádraig Ó Mórdha
- Lord of Laois
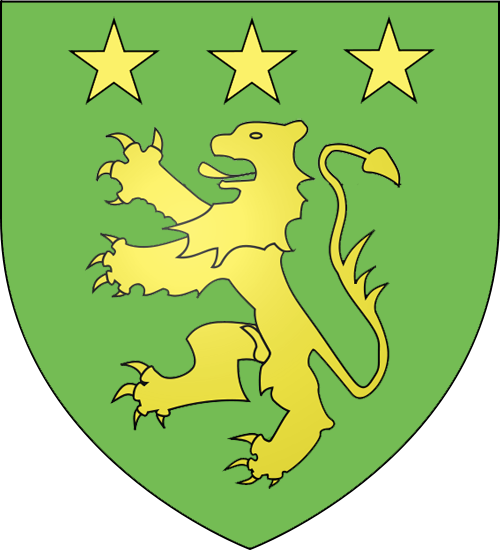
- Coat of arms
- Tenure: 1547-1548
- Predecessor: Rory Caoch O'More
- Successor: Conall Oge O'More
- Born: Ireland
- Died: c. December 1548; Southwark, London, England

Giolla Pádraig O'More (Irish: Giolla Pádraig Ó Mórdha), also spelt Giollapádraig, anglicised Gilla-Patrick, was an Irish noble. He was Lord of Laois from 1547 until his death in 1548.

He seized the lordship by allying with his family's rivals to kill his brother Rory Caoch O'More. He was later captured by English forces and died in the Marshalsea, a London prison.

== Early life ==
Giolla Pádraig O'More was born in Ireland to father Connell O'More, the Lord of Laois. His brothers were named Lysaght, Kedagh, Rory and Conall.

After his father's death in 1537, there was a power struggle between his uncle Peter and his older brothers. Kedagh eventually claimed the lordship - however, he died early in 1542, and Rory succeeded him.

== Alliance with O'Connor Faly ==
According to historian Emmett O’Byrne, O'More had ambitions to seize the lordship from his brother as early as 1543. He entered an alliance with Brian O'Connor Faly, the Lord of Offaly - a rival noble who was mistrusted by O'More's father and brother - by marrying his daughter. As O'Connor Faly's ally, O'More gained the favour of the Lord Deputy of Ireland, Englishman Anthony St Leger.

With his new father-in law, O'More attacked the Pale in May 1540. It seems O'Connor Faly encouraged the feud between Rory and Giolla Pádraig. Rory responded to his brother's hostility by allying with James Butler, 9th Earl of Ormond - he married Margaret Butler, the Earl's niece, between 1543 and 1544.

== Rebellion ==
In March 1546, Lord Deputy St Leger faced charges of misgovernment. O'More and O'Connor Faly feared they could lose their patron, and invaded Co. Kildare in late 1546, attacking the Anglo-Irish settlements. O'More was forced to flee into Offaly.

St Leger forced Rory and Giolla Pádraig to submit to authorities, bringing them to Dublin in hopes of stopping their bloodshed. In Rory's absence as Lord of Laois, O'Connor Faly devastated Laois, and St Leger detained Rory in his attempts to leave Dublin. Rory wrote to Henry VIII, accusing St Leger of favouritism.

The Annals of the Four Masters writes of O'More's destruction during this time:

"The plain of Cairbre and Castle-Carbury were plundered and burned... [Brian O'Connor Faly] and [Giolla Pádraig O'More] afterwards rose up, to join in this insurrection. When the Lord Justice, Anthony St. Leger, had heard of this, he came into Offaly, and plundered and burned the country as far as the Togher of Cruachan; and he remained there two nights, but he returned without receiving battle or submission. O'More... attacked the town of Ath-Ai, and burned the town and monastery, and destroyed many persons, both English and Irish, both by burning and slaying, on this occasion.”

By 1546, O'More and O'Connor Faly were proclaimed traitors throughout Ireland for siding with the English governance.

The following year, O'More launched another revolt against his brother. Rory was initially successful and forced O'More to retreat. However, O'More returned with O'Connor Faly's troops, killing Rory in battle. Giolla Pádraig O'More subsequently claimed control over Laois.

Upon Rory's death, his widow Margaret apparently left Ireland with his young sons, Rory and Callagh.

== As Lord of Laois ==
Although he had for some time enjoyed the privileges of being in St Leger's favour, by the time O'More had seized the lordship, the English authorities had become more antagonistic towards Irish nobles.

Following a string of losses, O'More and O'Connor Faly had to flee across the River Shannon into Connacht. They returned in early 1548, but none of their tribesmen would offer them protection.

Sir Edward Bellingham replaced St Leger as Lord Deputy in May 1548. That winter, the nobles faced starvation, having lost both Gaelic and loyalist allies.

The two nobles submitted themselves to the English in November, under the protection of "an English gentleman, i.e. the Lieutenant." However, their protection was very poor. The two men were pardoned their lives, but their territories were transferred to the King.

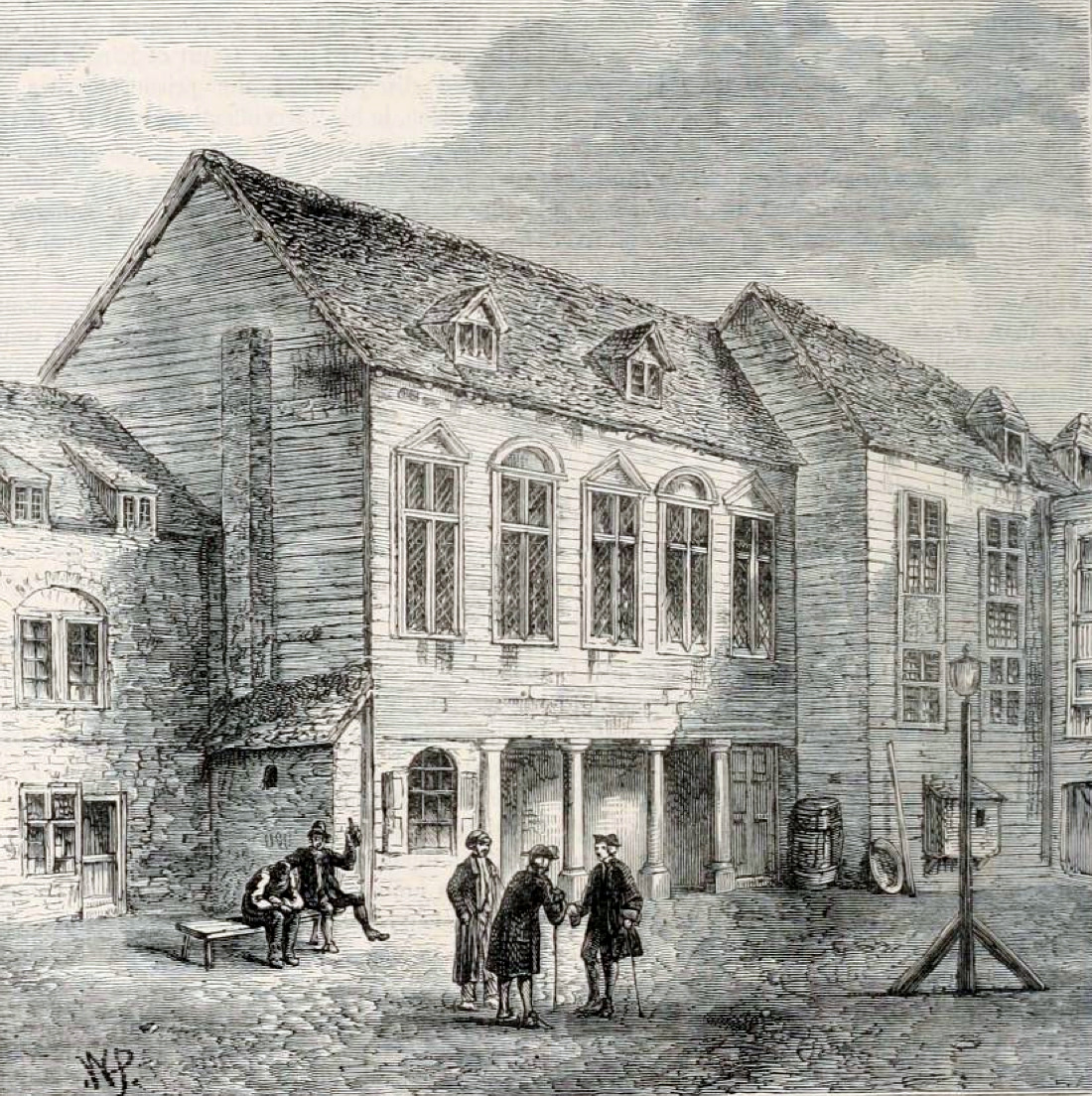
The Marshalsea, O'More's place of death

== Death ==
O'More and O'Connor Faly were brought to England and imprisoned in the Marshalsea, a prison in Southwark, London. In late 1548, O'More died during his imprisonment. His death is referenced in the Annals of the Four Masters:

"Giolla Pádraig O'More died suddenly in England; and he would have been a lamentable loss, were it not for the power of the English."

== Legacy ==
After O'More's death, his brother Conall Oge O'More succeeded him as Lord of Laois. In 1557, Conall was crucified in Leighlinbridge. In the early 1560s, it seems Rory's son, Rory Oge O'More, returned to Ireland and reclaimed his father's lordship.

== Family tree ==
Family tree of the Irish O'More clan

Murtagh O’More; Lord of Laois
Conn O’More fl. 1520	Conall O'More died 1537; Lord of Laois, 1523-1537	Gormflaith O'Carroll	Peter O'More; Lord of Laois, 1537-1538
Lysaght O'More died 1537; Lord of Slemargy	Kedagh Ruadh O'More died 1542; Lord of Laois, 1538-1542	Margaret Butler; Daughter of Thomas Butler	Rory Caoch O'More c. 1515 - 1547; Lord of Laois, 1542-1547	O'Dunne; Daughter of Tadhg O'Dunne	Giolla Pádraig O'More died 1548; Lord of Laois, 1547-1548	Conall Oge O'More died 1557; Lord of Laois, 1548-1557
James O'More; Lord of Laois, 1578	Domhnall MacLysaght O'More died 1557; Lord of Slemargy, 1557	Murtagh O’More died 1577; Lord of Slemargy, 1557-1577	Kedagh O'More fl. 1565	Lysaght O'More died 1570	Rory Oge O'More c. 1544 - 1578; Lord of Laois, 1557-1578	Margaret O'Byrne died 1577	Calvagh O'More; 1540 - 1618
Richard Tyrrell fl. 1565 - 1632	Doryne O'More	Owny MacRory O'More c. 1575 - 1600; Lord of Laois, 1594 - 1600	Fiach O’More	Remainn O'More fl. 1600-1601	Rory O'Moore c. 1600 - 1655
Owen O'Shiel; 1584-1650	Catherine Tyrrell fl. 1648	Richard Tyrrell Jr	Annabel Tyrrell	Elish Tyrrell

Sources

- Annals of the Four Masters
- Dictionary of Irish Biography (October 2009)
- Ó Raghallaigh, Eoghan (2010). "A poem to Rudhraighe Caoch Ó Mórdha, lord of Laois 1542-7" (PDF). Ossory, Laois and Leinster. 4.
- Dictionary of National Biography
- "The Church in Ireland During the Reigns of Henry VIII and Edward VI (1509-1553) @ ELCore.Net". 7 June 2010.
- "Combs &c. Families of County Laois, Ireland". combs-families.org.
- "Rory O Moore Genealogy". Archived from the original on 7 April 2011.
- Heitzler, Michael James (2005). Goose Creek, A Definitive History: Volume One, Planters, Politicians and Patriots. The History Press. p. 275. ISBN 978-1-59629-055-6. Retrieved 8 October 2011.
- Thaddeus Dowling. "Annales Breves Hiberniae".

== Sources ==
- This article incorporates text from a publication now in the public domain: Archbold, William Arthur Jobson (1895). "O'More, Rory (d.1578)". In Lee, Sidney (ed.). Dictionary of National Biography. Vol. 42. London: Smith, Elder & Co. p. 175.
