= Brian O'Connor Faly =

Irish noble

Brian O'Connor Faly Brian mac Cathaoir Ó Conchobhair Failghe
- Baron Offaly
- Tenure: 1520-1560
- Predecessor: An Calbhach O'Connor Faly
- Born: c. 1490; Ireland
- Died: 1560; Dublin Castle, Ireland
- Spouse: Mary FitzGerald (married c. 1524)

Brian O'Connor Faly (Irish: Brian Ó Conchobhair Failghe; c. 1490 – 1560), also called Bernard, was an Irish noble and Lord of Offaly.

O'Connor Faly raided the Pale many times from the early 1520s to the mid-1540s, assuring his political position via alliances with the Earl of Kildare and Lord Deputy of Ireland. However, his many attacks on the territories of his fellow Gaelic nobles estranged him from both Gaelic and English allies, and facing threat of starvation, he surrendered to the English in 1548. He escaped the Tower of London c. 1552, but was recaptured and eventually died in Dublin Castle.

== Family background ==
Born in Ireland around 1490, he was the eldest son of Cathaoir (1474–1511), Lord of Offaly. He had four brothers, one named Cahir. He was born into the O'Connor Faly family of the Kingdom of Uí Failghe, which, by the start of the sixteenth century, had extended their territory westward as far as the River Shannon. The people of Meath and Kildare paid a yearly black rent to the O'Connor Falys. The suffix Faly (Irish: Failghe) is used to distinguish them from other O'Connor families.

In 1511, Cathaoir attempt to assert Offaly's independence from Gerald FitzGerald, 8th Earl of Kildare. The Earl's allies, Cathaoir's cousins Brian and An Calbhach, responded by assassinating Cathaoir. Cousin Brian seized rule of Offaly until his death in 1517, when he was succeeded by his brother An Calbhach.

By 1520, Brian O'Connor Faly had become Lord of Offaly, and was "at the height of his power" - though it is uncertain whether he obtained the throne from his uncle An Calbhach by force or succeeded him naturally.

== Raiding the Pale ==
In the early 1520s, O'Connor Faly, Maolruanaidh O'Carroll and Lord of Laois Connell O'More raided the Pale. The three men informed Thomas Howard, Lord Lieutenant of Ireland, that their attack was on the orders of Gerald FitzGerald, 9th Earl of Kildare. Howard retaliated by capturing Monasteroris, O'Connor Faly's stronghold in Offaly. After a time refusing to cooperate, O'Connor Faly eventually submitted. Monasteroris was given back to him and Howard invested him as Lord of Offaly. However, upon Howard's departure, O'Connor Faly continued his raids.

O'Connor Faly strengthened his alliance with the Earl of Kildare when married the Earl's daughter, Lady Mary FitzGerald, sometime between 1523 and 1526.

In 1528, during the Earl's detention in England, vice-deputy Richard Nugent, 7th Baron Delvin, attempted to withhold O'Connor Faly's black rents from Meath. On May 12, O'Connor Faly retaliated by persuading Nugent to the borders of Offaly - under the false impression of a parley - and taking him prisoner. He refused to release Nugent unless his demands were met. Thomas Boleyn, Earl of Ossory, made plans with Brian's brother Cahir to secure Nugent's release - but this was unsuccessful. Delvin was O'Connor Faly's prisoner until early 1529.

== Alliance with Kildare ==
O'Connor Faly invaded the Pale in autumn 1529, under secret orders from the Earl of Kildare. He was subsequently pardoned shortly after the Earl's restoration.

In 1534, O'Connor Faly was a staunch ally of Silken Thomas, son of the recently deceased Kildare. It was from O'Connor Faly's castle that Thomas addressed Lord Deputy Leonard Grey.

O'Connor Faly felt betrayed by his brother Cahir's dealings with the English administration, and he expelled Cahir from Offaly. In May 1537, Grey forced O'Connor Faly from Offaly and appointed Cahir as Lord of Offaly instead. On 2 March 1538, O'Connor Faly made a "full and complete submission", renouncing his Catholicism, eschewing back rents and agreeing to pay a yearly rent to the crown. He was pardoned, but his request to be created Baron of Offaly was apparently ignored.

== Alliance with O'More ==
O'Connor Faly entered an alliance with Giolla Pádraig O'More, son of Connell. He encouraged a feud between O'More and his brother Rory, the then-Lord of Laois. Together, O'Connor Faly and O'More attacked the Pale in May 1540.

Brian O'Connor Faly was in the favour of the Lord Deputy, Englishman Anthony St Leger. In March 1546, Lord Deputy St Leger faced charges of misgovernment. O'Connor Faly and O'More feared they could lose their patron, and invaded Co. Kildare in late 1546, attacking the Anglo-Irish settlements.

When St Leger called Rory O'More to Dublin, O'Connor Faly devastated Laois in his absence. Rory wrote to Henry VIII, accusing St Leger of favouritism - St Leger detained Rory when he tried to leave Dublin.

By 1546, O'Connor Faly was proclaimed a traitor throughout Ireland for siding with the English governance. Following a string of losses, O'Connor Faly and Giolla Pádraig O'More fled across the River Shannon into Connacht. They returned in early 1548, but none of their tribesmen would offer them protection. In May, St Leger was replaced as Lord Deputy by Sir Edward Bellingham. Having lost both Gaelic and loyalist allies, the nobles faced starvation that winter.

In November, O'Connor Faly and O'More surrendered themselves to the English under the "very poor" protection of an English lieutenant. The two men's lives were pardoned, but their territories were transferred to the King.

== Imprisonment and death ==
O'Connor Faly and O'More were brought to England and imprisoned in the Marshalsea, a London prison. O'More died during imprisonment in late 1548. O'Connor Faly was later incarcerated in the Tower of London. He escaped in late 1551 or early 1552, but was recaptured near the Scottish border, "while in the company of women".

In September 1553, his fortunes briefly changed when St Leger was reappointed Lord Deputy. St Leger paid for O'Connor Faly's daughter Margaret to travel to England and petition for her father's release. O'Connor Faly's son Rory offered himself to the Dublin government in return for his father's freedom. Their petition was successful and he was released by Queen Mary I.

In 1554, he returned to Ireland with his daughter and Gerald FitzGerald, the 11th Earl of Kildare. However, later the same year, the Earl thwarted St Leger's plan by acknowledging Brian's son Donnchadh as the rightful lord. Consequently, Rory was freed, while Brian was recommitted to imprisonment in Dublin Castle.

Brian O'Connor Faly died in Dublin Castle in 1560.

== Family & legacy ==
Brian O’Connor Faly and Mary FitzGerald had at least ten recorded children - eight (possibly nine) sons and two daughters, including Cathal, Donnchadh, Calvach, Cormac, Margaret, Rory, Teige, Art, Rosse and Connor.

Connor became the chief rebel leader in Offaly and was one of Rory Oge O'More's most trusted captains. Cathal became a prominent rebel and fled to Spain in the 1580s to escape execution. In 1596, Cathal and his mother died in a shipwreck on the 2nd Spanish Armada.
