= O'Donnell Abú =

Traditional Irish song

"O'Donnell Abú" (Irish: Ó Domhnaill Abú) is a traditional Irish song. Its lyrics were written by a Fenian Michael Joseph McCann in 1843. It refers to the Gaelic lord Red Hugh O'Donnell who ruled Tyrconnell in the late sixteenth century, first with the approval of the Crown authorities in Dublin and later in rebellion against them during Tyrone's Rebellion. The title refers to the Gaelic war cry of "Abú", "To victory", which followed a commander's name.

== Style ==
Stylistically the song draws on the romantic nationalism of the mid-nineteenth century, similar to those of McCann's contemporary Thomas Davis.

== Lyrics ==
Loudly the note of the trumpet is sounding;
Proudly the war cries arise on the gale;
Fleetly the steed by Lough Swilly is bounding,
To join the thick squadrons on Saimear's green vale.
On, ev'ry mountaineer,
Strangers to flight or fear,
Rush to the standard of dauntless Red Hugh.
Bonnaught and Gallowglass,
Throng from each mountain pass.
On for old Erin, "O'Donnell Abú!"

Princely O'Neill to our aid is advancing
With many a chieftain and warrior clan.
A thousand proud steeds in his vanguard are prancing
'Neath the borderers brave from the Banks of the Bann:
Many a heart shall quail
Under its coat of mail.
Deeply the merciless foeman shall rue
When on his ears shall ring,
Borne on the breeze's wing,
Tír Chonaill's dread war-cry, "O'Donnell Abú!"

Wildly o'er Desmond the war-wolf is howling;
Fearless the eagle sweeps over the plain;
The fox in the streets of the city is prowling--
All who would scare them are banished or slain!
Grasp ev'ry stalwart hand
Hackbut and battle brand--
Pay them all back the debt so long due;
Norris and Clifford well
Can of Tirconnell tell;
Onward to glory--"O'Donnell abú!"

Sacred the cause that Clan Connell's defending--
The altars we kneel at and homes of our sires;
Ruthless the ruin the foe is extending--
Midnight is red with the plunderer's fires.
On with O'Donnell then,
Fight the old fight again,
Sons of Tirconnell,
All valiant and true:
Make the false Saxon feel
Erin's avenging steel!
Strike for your country! "O'Donnell Abú!"

The song portrays the rallying cry for the O’Donnell clan, called to assemble at a location on the banks of the River Erne. The Bonnaught and Gallowglass were Irish and Scots mercenaries employed by O'Donnell to guard the mountain passes. They are now summoned to join the rest of O'Donnell's forces, who await the arrival of Hugh O’Neill, Earl of Tyrone, and the Borderers who protect his lands.

== Legacy ==
In the 1930s, it was adopted as the anthem of the Irish fascist paramilitaries, the Blueshirts.

The song was chosen by 2RN (later Radio Éireann) as the station ID signal in 1936, following a poll of listeners, and it continues to be used: it is played on RTÉ Radio 1 at 5.30 every morning.

In 1956, it was recorded by Irish folk group the Clancy Brothers and Tommy Makem.

It appears in the 1966 film, The Fighting Prince of Donegal.

The music with new lyrics was used by the Christian Brothers from Ireland as the school rally of St. Joseph's College in Hong Kong.

The music with lyrics of Chong Gene Hang College in Hong Kong from 1971 was modified from St. Joseph's College, Hong Kong. In 2000, the lyrics were translated into Chinese.

== See also ==
- Follow Me up to Carlow
