= Giolla Pádraig O'More (died 1420) =

Irish nobleman (died 1420)

Giolla Pádraig O'More Giolla Pádraig Ó Mórdha
- Lord of Laois
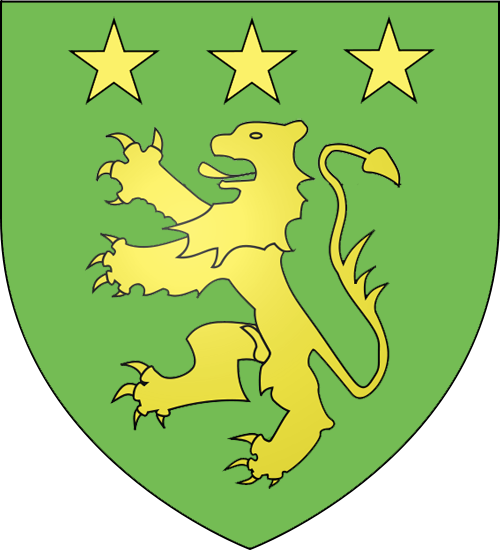
- Coat of arms
- Tenure: c. 1398-1420
- Predecessor: Maolsheachlainn O'More
- Successor: Kedagh O'More
- Died: 1420; Ireland

Giolla Pádraig O'More (Irish: Giolla Pádraig Ó Mórdha), anglicised Gillapatrick, was a medieval Irish nobleman. He was Lord of Laois from about 1398 until his death in 1420.

His father Fachtna O'More died in 1377.

In 1392, Giolla Pádraig O'More probably went with his predecessor Maolsheachlainn O'More to participate in the MacMurrough devastation of Carlow and Kildare.

In 1398, Maolsheachlainn apparently died of natural causes. Giolla Pádraig's rise to power was unexpected, as his grandfather David mac Lysaght O'More had lost the title in 1348. Since the 1340s, the O'More clan's power had declined due to internal conflict.

Giolla Pádraig O'More's wife was the daughter of Murchadh O'Connor Faly and Gormflaith MacMurrough. They had at least one son, Uaithne (c. 1400 - 1490), though they may have had another son named Fachtna. O'More's wife died in 1404.

Later in 1404, O'More gained victory over the English at Atha Duibh. According to the Annals of the Four Masters, "many persons were slain, and great spoil was taken in horses, arms, and armour." He killed Richard "Hardfoot" Butler in 1405. After this, there followed about a decade-long period of relative peace.

In late November 1414, Lieutenant John Talbot, Lord Furnival, arrived in Ireland. He devastated Laois and took O'More's castle in early 1415.

O'More died in 1420. He was succeeded by Kedagh O'More, who died of the plague in 1464.
