= Battle of Kilrush =

Part of the Irish Confederate Wars

Coordinates: 53.062128°N 6.862631°W

- Part of the Irish Confederate Wars
Date	15 April 1642
Location	Kilrush, County Kildare
Result	Crown victory

Belligerents
Kingdom of Ireland	Irish Confederates

Commanders and leaders
Earl of Ormonde	Viscount Mountgarret

Strength
3,000 infantry 500 cavalry	8,000 infantry 400 cavalry

Casualties and losses
60	500

Ireland and Kilrush

The Battle of Kilrush was a fought during the Irish Confederate Wars. It was fought on 15 April 1642 between a Royalist army under the Earl of Ormonde and Irish Confederate troops commanded by Lord Mountgarret.

== Background ==
On 2 April 1642, the Earl of Ormonde, serving as the commander of the Royalist army in Ireland, led his second expedition into the counties of Kildare and Laois, reinforcing Royalist garrisons and wreaking havoc upon the landowners who had joined the Irish Rebellion of 1641. After a ten-day period in which his forces traveled from Dublin to Maryborough (now Portlaoise), Ormonde returned part way back to Athy and became aware of the nearby presence of a large rebel militia attempting to intercept his force as they returned to Dublin.

== Before the battle ==
Although Ormonde had left Dublin with 3,000 foot and 500 horse, his reinforcement activities had significantly reduced the size of his detachment and he desired to avoid a direct confrontation with the rebels if possible. Thomas Carte said that at Kilrush Ormonde's ".. whole army did not in able fighting men exceed above two thousand four hundred men, and four hundred horse .."

The rebel militia, estimated to be as large as 8,000 foot with several hundred horse, was reported to have crossed the River Barrow at Mageny-ford 10 kilometers to the south. The rebel militia was commanded by Lord Mountgarret and attended by other rebel leaders including Rory O'Moore and Hugh O'Byrne. As it happened, Mountgarret was Ormonde's great-uncle.

Given his predicament, Ormonde moved out of Athy early on the morning of 15 April traveling northeast along the high ground through the towns of Ardscull and Funtstown. The rebel militia moved concurrently in the same direction along the high ground southeast of Ormonde's army through the towns of Ballyndrum and Narraghmore. The rebels were attempting to reach the Ballyshannon pass before the Royalists. Slowed by his wagons and baggage, Ormonde decided to send his cavalry on ahead. The rebels arrived first and took positions in Kilrush and Bullhill intercepting Ormonde's force.

== Battle ==
Although he was outnumbered, Ormonde managed to defeat the rebels. Mountgarret's militia was poorly organized and the Royalist cavalry led the way breaking the left wing of the rebel militia with their first charge. The right wing of the rebel militia held for some time but later retreated and broke. Many of the fleeing rebels were overtaken and killed. Other rebels sought the safety of a nearby bog, where the Royalist horse could not follow.

Carte described the rebel right wing at the crux of the fighting: "All this time the right wing of the army of the rebels stood firm, without moving. There were in it the lord Mountgarret, Hugh Byrne and several others of the principal rebels. Against this body ... Ormond advanced with his corps of volunteers, and three hundred foot commanded by sir John Sherlock, lieutenant-colonel of lord Lambert's regiment. The rebels stood the exchanging of several volleys of shot, and then retired in some order till they got to the top of an hill near them, when they broke at once, and ran for their lives .."

Ormonde claimed that over 500 rebels had been killed. The actual number of rebel casualties is unknown although a number of ranked individuals were reported to be lost and the rebel militia participating in this battle ceased to exist. In his biography of Ormonde (1736) Thomas Carte described this campaign in six pages, and assessed the casualties at Kilrush as: "..twenty English slain and about forty wounded; but the rebels lost above seven hundred killed outright."

== Aftermath ==
The Royalists considered the battle such a great victory that the Irish government presented Ormonde with a jewel valued at £500. The rebel leaders including Mountgarret, O'Moore, and O'Byrne all survived the battle and continued to play prominent roles in the Irish Confederate Wars.

At the time the Royalist forces had many garrisons around Ireland, but only one field army, which, if it had been surrounded and destroyed at Kilrush, would have had an enormous strategic effect across the whole island. This was the longer-term outcome of the battle.

== Sources ==
- Bagwell, Richard (1909). Ireland Under the Stuarts and During the Interregnum: 1642–1660 – Volume 2 of Ireland Under the Stuarts and During the Interregnum. Longmans, Green and Company.
- Carte, T. (1851). Life of Ormonde, 3 vols., 1735–1736 (Republished in 6 vols. ed.). Oxford.
- Jackson, Mason (1885). The Pictorial Press, Its Origin and Progress. London: Hurst and Blackett.
- Kelsey, Sean (2004). "Butler, Richard, third Viscount Mountgarret". Oxford Dictionary of National Biography (online ed.). Oxford University Press. doi:10.1093/ref:odnb/4202. (Subscription, Wikipedia Library access or UK public library membership required.)
- Rawson, Thomas James (1807). Statistical Survey of the County of Kildare: With Observations on the Means of Improvement; Drawn Up for the Consideration, and by Direction of the Dublin Society. Graisberry and Campbell.
