= Lord of Slemargy =

Gaelic Irish noble title

The Lord of Slemargy was a title held by Irish Gaelic nobility, specifically the O'More and McMurrough families.

== Origin ==
Slievemargy (Irish: Sliabh Mairge) is a barony in County Laois, named after mountains in the area. The name has been anglicised "Slieuemargue", "Slewmergie", "Slieuemargue" and "Slieuemargy" - The Dictionary of Irish Biography uses the spelling "Slemargy".

== Title history ==
In 1398, Maurice Boy O'More held the title.

In March 1557, the Lord of Slemargy, Domhnall MacLysaght O'More, and his uncle Conall Og O'More, Lord of Laois, were respectively hanged and crucified by the English administration in Leighlinbridge.

By the early 1560s, Domhnall's brother Murtagh O'More (Irish: Muircheartach Ó Mórdha) was using the title. Murtagh was killed around 1577 in the Massacre of Mullaghmast, a mass killing of Gaelic nobility. His cousin, infamous rebel and Lord of Laois Rory O'More, avenged Murtagh's death by gathering an army and burning the town of Naas.
