= Fiach McHugh O'Byrne =

Fiach mac Aodha Ó Broin Fiach MacHugh O'Byrne
- Lord of "Clann Uí Bhroin"
- The armorial achievements of Fiach McHugh O'Byrne
- Reign: 1579–1597
- Coronation: 1587, County Wicklow
- Predecessor: Aodh mac Seáin Ó Broin
- Successor: Féilim mac Fiach Ó Broin
- Born: c. 1534; Ballinacor
- Died: 8 May 1597; Farranerin, County Wicklow
- Spouse: Rose Ó Tuathail (second wife)
- House: Ballinacor – Ranelagh

Fiach mac Aodha Ó Broin (anglicised as Feagh or Fiach MacHugh O'Byrne) (1534 – 8 May 1597) was Chief of the Name of Clann Uí Bhroin (Clan O'Byrne) and Lord of Ranelagh during the Elizabethan wars against the Irish clans.

== Background ==
During the reign of Queen Elizabeth I of England, the O'Byrnes controlled territory in the Wicklow mountains south of Dublin, covering about 153,000 acres (620 km^{2}). The fastness of the Ranelagh O'Byrnes lay toward the south, at Ballinacor in Glenmalure, where they maintained a fort near to a ford with a bridge and a castle at Drumkitt (now encompassed within Ballinacor House). The territory included the oak wood of Shillelagh and part of County Wexford.

The Kiltimon, Downs, Cloneroe and Newrath branches of the clan were generally loyal to the Crown, having benefited under English law by primogeniture and the system of 'surrender and regrant'. The Ranelagh O'Byrnes were unsubmissive and were reckoned capable of fielding one hundred expert swordsmen, posing a constant threat to Tudor authority within the Pale through raids on the lowlands, which weighed in the balance of power between the Butler (Ormond) and Fitzgerald (Kildare) dynasties in Leinster.

The O'Byrne territory had been under the nominal authority of a sheriff, but in 1562 the task of bringing order to the border area was given to an English captain. So varied were the local allegiances, and so difficult did the territory prove to police, that little was achieved by the crown government and during the rest of the queen's reign (to 1603) the O'Byrnes proved adept at securing official pardons.

== Early career ==
In 1569 the Ranelagh O'Byrnes, under the leadership of Fiach's father, Hugh, had given help to the rebels during the Desmond Rebellions. Fiach (in Irish, the raven) assisted the escape of the imprisoned Edmund Butler, when the latter fell from a rope while climbing from the battlements of Dublin Castle. Thereafter he proved wily and skilful, and ultimately betrayed an ambition to undermine Tudor authority in Ireland.

In 1572, Fiach was charged with complicity in the murder of Robert Browne of Mulcranan, son-in-law of the seneschal of County Wexford, Sir Nicholas White. The crown commander in Wicklow led a punitive expedition from Newcastle near Bray, seizing a mountain man and forcing him at the peril of his life to lead the crown troops into the heart of O'Byrne territory, where sixteen villages were burned and hundreds slaughtered. Fiach escaped with the loss of two sisters and two foster brothers. In retaliation he led 400 men in raids on villages in Wexford, managing to retire to Glenmalure after evading the seneschal's forces. But in August he surrendered custody of the original murderer in return for a pardon and a fine of 20 marks.

Under the government of Sir Henry Sidney, O'Byrne gave support to his own brother-in-law, Rory Oge O'More, the pretender to the lordship of Leix, who broke out in rebellion in 1577. In a bloody fight with Sir John Harrington, many of O'More's household were killed, although O'Byrne's sister was spared by the crown forces. After O'More's death, O'Byrne took in the rebel's son for training at Ballinacor, which by that time had become a martial academy.

O'Byrne was in correspondence with Gerald FitzGerald, 15th Earl of Desmond and never lost touch with Gerald FitzGerald, 11th Earl of Kildare, for whom he did a great favour by hanging an important witness when Kildare was under government investigation. The O'Byrnes continued with their cattle raids, until Fiach made his submission in early 1579 at Christ Church Cathedral, Dublin, where he gave pledges of allegiance and acknowledged the authority of the crown government. This sequence of raids and pardons continued for some time.

== Desmond rebellions ==
In 1579, after succeeding his father in the leadership of the O'Byrnes, Fiach joined with James Eustace, Viscount Baltinglass – despite a history of mutual enmity between their families – during the Second Desmond Rebellion. In the summer of 1580, the Earl of Desmond fled Munster into Queens County (aided by the O'Mores), where he joined the O'Byrnes near the Wicklow border. In August Fiach joined with the Kavanagh clan to ambush crown forces in Idrone (County Carlow): the Irish fought their way through the territory and, after burning the manor house, executed those Kavanaghs who had succumbed to the rule of the English Carew family.

In the same month in 1580 a new Lord Deputy of Ireland, Arthur Grey, 14th Baron Grey de Wilton, arrived with 6,000 newly recruited troops. He found the country in a nervous state, owing to the threat of Spanish intervention in favour of the rebels: Crown commanders throughout the country were on guard, and Grey was beset at every point of the compass. It was clear that cutting off the source of so many raids against the underbelly of Dublin, within twenty five miles of the city, was necessary. An offensive into the province of Munster was expected, and before he might engage on that campaign Grey had to deal with the O'Byrnes to prevent them attacking him in the rear as he marched south. The campaign resulted in the Battle of Glenmalure.

== Battle of Glenmalure ==
In 1580, Grey led his army westward through the Pale, ignoring certain veterans who implored him to delay the campaign. He planned to enter Glenmalure from the neighbouring Glen of Imaal and attack O'Byrne's stronghold; the enemy was expected to be flushed from its fastness, whereupon the English cavalry would ride them down in their flight. O'Byrne had remained in the Liffey valley with Baltinglas, but at the approach of the crown army he withdrew into Glenmalure.

Grey altered his course and travelled several miles south, where he was joined by Kildare, before heading east in a loop and making an arduous ascent into the mountains. After a row amongst his chief officers, Grey sent an expedition of half his force in royal livery with their colours aloft.

The rebel lookout on the peak of Lugnaquilla sounded the alarm, and Grey ordered his men to descend into the glen with a drum roll. O'Byrne had concealed his men in the craggy terrain, and the English troops, conspicuous in their red and blue coats and white hose, instantly found themselves sliding along a river course. Decimated by sniping gunfire, they hit bottom fully a mile in depth from the point where the glen was entered. The Irish did not wait: shots were fired from both sides, and the kern descended to engage in hand-to-hand combat. Grey's troops were routed with the loss of hundreds, and much valuable equipment had to be discarded. Grey spurred his cavalry on to check the pursuit and force the rebels back into the glen, but even on the retreat to Dublin the punishment was withering.

Despite this disturbing setback, Grey was in a position to post a garrison in the locality, in the hope that this would contain O'Byrne; but the raids kept coming, even into the suburbs of Dublin. In the campaign that ensued, O'Byrne did suffer losses and failed to dislodge the garrison, but he held out, even after the crown had asserted its command in Munster with the massacre at Smerwick of the Papal invasion force.

In the following spring, when Grey passed through Wicklow, O'Byrne showed his forces on the hills and sent sorties to cut off the straggling plate wagons. He insisted that the terms offered to him include a pardon for Desmond and a guarantee of freedom of conscience. But the glens now became so frequented with crown troops that he was forced to accept the original terms and, once hostages had been given to the government, he received his pardon.

== Quiet times ==
For some years after, O'Byrne remained docile and, following the death of the Earl of Desmond in 1583, had even received into his territory his old foe, Nicholas White, upon the first visit to that place by a senior crown judge. He gave his uncle and sons as hostages to the new governor, Sir John Perrot, who hanged a piper sent in by O'Byrne after a cattle raid which had been carried out to the piper's tune. Some of the hostages escaped, but O'Byrne soon appeared before Perrot in English dress and supplied more hostages.

In March 1587 the Irish wife of the English captain, Sir Thomas Lee, let it be known that her husband was plotting to capture O'Byrne, and Lee decided to separate from her. In 1589 twenty-two O'Byrne hostages escaped custody – including two of Fiach's sons and his brother-in-law – eleven were recaptured. O'Byrne's docility remained in doubt, and he was soon found attacking Arklow Castle in revenge for a private wrong.

== Cat and mouse ==
In 1592 O'Byrne involved himself in another escape from Dublin Castle. Hugh Roe O'Donnell had escaped the castle in the previous year, only to be betrayed while on the run. His second attempt was a success, and although he suffered frostbite O'Donnell was guided to Glenmalure, whence O'Byrne despatched him home to the province of Ulster. The grave of Art O'Neill (son of Shane O'Neill), a fellow prisoner who died during the escape, lies southwest of Granabeg towards Glenmalure, in the townland of Oakwood.

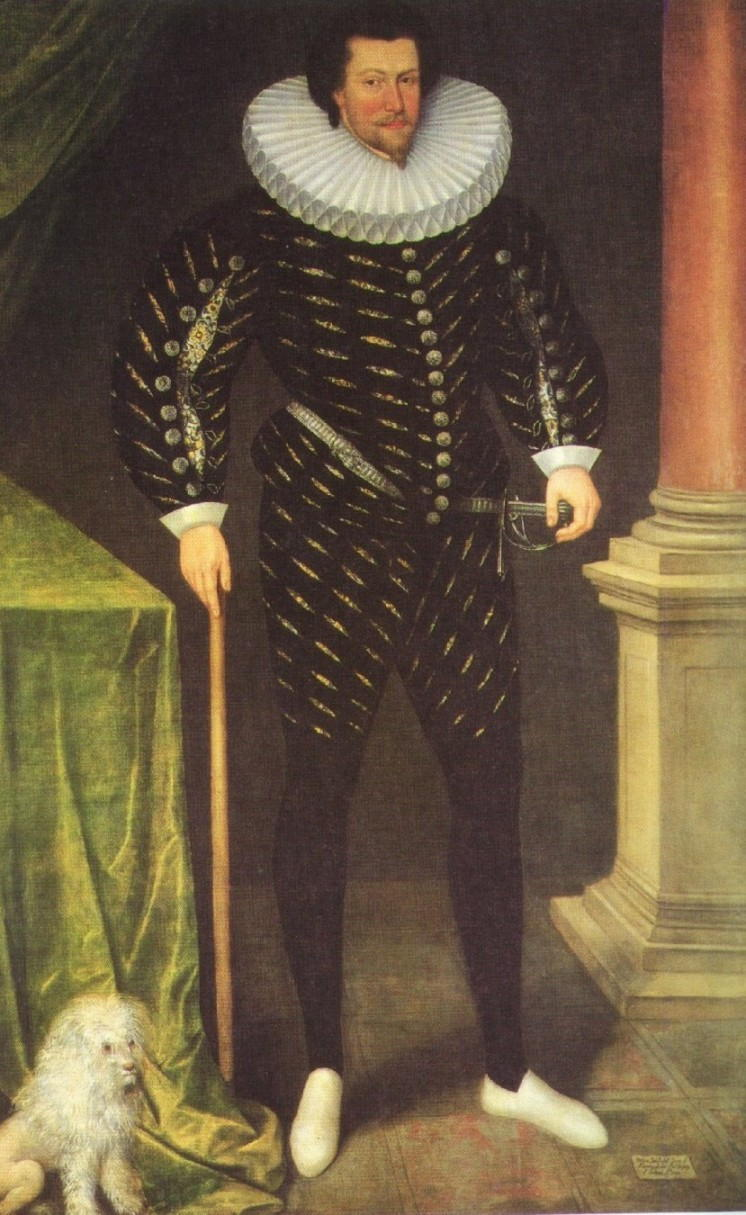
Lord Deputy William Russell sought to defeat O'Byrne.

O'Byrne fell quiet again, but Lee insisted throughout the period 1594–96 that he was a traitor to the crown, and a new initiative against him was directed by the lord deputy, Sir William Russell. After the Christmas festivities of 1594, Russell drove O'Byrne from Ballinacor in a three-day offensive and garrisoned his house. On their approach to the ramparts of Ballinacor a drum had been accidentally sounded before the troops could reach the gate, which put O'Byrne on his guard, and the gate was defended while those inside fled to safety. It was a mark of how close the government was coming in its efforts to tame the Wicklow highlands, and a reward of £150 was posted for O'Byrne's capture (or £100 for his head).

O'Byrne and his second wife, Rose O'Toole, were proclaimed traitors. Days later the Dublin suburb of Crumlin was burned by his son-in-law, Walter Reagh, and the flames of the raid were seen in the centre of Dublin, whereupon Russell ordered the city gates opened as he sent cavalry in pursuit, but to no avail. In response, a fort was built at Ballinacor with 100 O'Byrne labourers, and the pressure on the clan territory was increased. Walter Reagh Fitzgerald was captured and hanged alive in chains for 24 hours before being impaled on a spike.

Russell set up spring camp at Shillelagh, hunting and fishing and receiving the heads of rebels, but O'Byrne was elusive and he intrigued with Hugh O'Neill, Earl of Tyrone. The O'Byrnes executed an attack at Athy, but Fiach denounced the raid. At about this time his wife, Rose O'Toole, was captured and, upon her conviction for treason by a Dublin jury, sentenced to death by burning; her life was spared, only because she had been convinced to convey information to Fiach that his son Turlough was betraying him. O'Byrne delivered over Turlough, who was executed.

== Ulster alliance ==
In his negotiations with Russell, during a truce in the Nine Years War, Hugh O'Neill included terms for the treatment of O'Byrne, and reinforced his point with the capture of the Blackwater fort, which was said to have been in response to the lord deputy's campaign in Wicklow. O'Byrne sought pardon for himself and his family – excluding his most wayward sons – in the summer of 1596, by which time he was old and sick. He presented himself on his knees to the council sitting at Dublin to seek mercy and was granted his pardon upon petition to the queen. Even so, he was in alliance with O'Neill, acting as a Leinster base for rebel influence and maintaining a force on the borders of the Pale.

The fort at Ballinacor was retaken by O'Byrne, and the attacks on government forces in Wicklow began again. He had also allied with the O'Mores, Kavanaghs, O'Connors and O'Tooles, and was thought by Russell to be of far greater ability than O'Neill. However, the rest of the O'Byrnes were not considered a threat, indeed the clan were divided, with some engaging in the hunting down of Fiach, and a new fort was built at Rathdown.

During the winter, Russell scoured the mountains, taking in cattle and heads. He crossed the bridge at Ballinacor ford against resistance on 24 September 1596 and stayed on the mountain with his cavalry. Meanwhile, Captain Lee was sent with a force to Fananerin, on the west side of Glenmalure (i.e. in Manning's bog 1-mile (1.6 km) north of Greenane north of the river), where he burned the town before returning to camp. O'Neill complained of the attacks on O'Byrne, and Lee was left to engage in sporadic fighting. The government believed that O'Neill was attempting to divert the attacks, and so Russell made the final push in March 1597, when he marched over the mountains to Fananerin and on to Ballinacor and into the glen. There he made a show of dining, and knighted an officer in the place where one of the Carews had been slain during Grey's campaign in 1580.

Russell withdrew, only to return two months later on the information of the northern branch of the O'Byrne clan. He was due for recall to London, and it seems that the defeat of O'Byrne himself had become the ultimate aim of his government. Again the Lord Deputy came to Fananerin (Sunday, 8 May 1597), with troops converging on the town from three directions. O'Byrne was in the company of a few swordsmen, who were killed at the first incursion, and fled on foot. He was compelled by exhaustion to seek refuge in a cave, where Captain Thomas Lee caught up with him. He was executed by Lee's soldiers, and his own sword was used to cut off his head, which was presented to Russell before his return to Dublin the next day. It was the governor's final success in Ireland. Lee later met with O'Byrne's son, Phelim, at Rathmines, and swore the killing had not been of his choice.

== Lost head ==
O'Byrne's corpse was dismembered and for months the head and quarters hung on pike staffs on the wall over Dublin Castle's drawbridge. Several months later the pickled head was presented to the council secretary in London by an English adventurer, who was disappointed to find that the head-silver due on O'Byrne had already been paid in Ireland. The queen was angered that, "the head of such a base Robin Hood was brought solemnly into England". The offending item was prepared for burial, but was found a day or two later in Enfield Chase, outside London, placed in the fork of a tree.

== Descendants ==
"Many efforts have been made over the years to find modern descendants of the Glenmalur Chief, Feach mac Hugh O'Byrne. None have met with any notable success."

Toirdelbhach, Fiach's eldest son, was executed on 18 July 1595. He had two daughters and no sons.

Fiach's second son, Felim Buidh na Laragh, was an MP for County Wicklow and died in 1630. He married Winifred O'Toole of Castlekevin (daughter of Luke), who died in 1628. A son of the couple was Brian O'Birn of Ballincor, outlawed in 1652. His son was Colonel Shane mac Brian O'Birn, who served in the army of the Irish Catholic Confederation in the 1640s.

A family genealogy brings Fiach's descendants down to 1875, in the persons of brothers Alfred and John Byrne of Sleaty, County Laois. Alfred, a soldier, was the eldest and would have been ninth in descent from Felim, his pedigree been Alfred, son of Gerald of Sleaty, son of Charles of Sleaty, son of Gerald of Ballinakill, son of Charles, son of Edmond of Ballinakill (died 1737,) son of Hugh, son of Shane, son of Brian, son of Felim, son of Fiach.

Mac Brádaigh agrees that the descent down to Colonel Shane O'Birn is correct, it has been verified in the genealogies of the Gabhal Raghnail. He furthermore is inclined to accept the descent from Edmond O'Birn of Ballinakill, Clonmore (died 1737) down to Alfred and John.

However, Mac Brádaigh casts grave doubts on the authenticity of Aodh Ó Broin, putative son of Colonel Ó Broin, stating that he "does not belong naturally in either section. ... He is called Aodh Gancagh in the description of his putative son Éamon, a description which associates the latter, and by implication the former, with the place called Clonmore. This makes it apparent that simple 'Aodh Ó Broin' is meant to be Aodh Gancagh of Clonmore but the later in its full form was the name of an uncle of Feach mac Aodha and brother to his mother Sadhbh. Could a member of Feach's family, five generations removed from Sadhbh, by strange chance be named Hugh and be connected with Clonmore? It seems very unlikely! Aodh Ó Broin looks phoney, so the genealogy ... is probably false, but perhaps there is someone out there who could prove me wrong."

Sadhbh Ní Bhroin was the daughter of Feidhlim Buidhe Ó Broin of Clonmore.

== Legacy ==
O'Byrne's role has been overshadowed by accounts of O'Neill in the Nine Years War. In June 1597, O'Neill attacked on several fronts – Carrickfergus, Newry and Westmeath – in retaliation for the killing of his ally. O'Byrne's sons, Phelim and Redmond, survived their father and were active during the remainder of the war.

On going north into Ulster, Phelim was given charge of the Blackwater fort. In October 1597, the brothers returned south and began active operations at O'Neill's direction with a force under the command of the O'Mores. In 1599, Phelim had a success against the ill-fated army of the Earl of Essex (see Essex in Ireland), and Redmond returned to O'Neill's ranks. The war ended with the Treaty of Mellifont, and in 1606 Phelim and Redmond received grants of what lands were left to them in their father's estate.

It was under the patronage of Fiach McHugh O'Byrne that part of the Book of O'Byrne, a collection of Irish bardic poetry, was compiled. A manuscript copy was sold at auction in 2000 in Dublin.

== In popular culture ==
Fiach McHugh O'Byrne is celebrated in the song by P. J. McCall Follow me up to Carlow, which has been covered by many groups including Planxty, The Wolfe Tones and Cruachan.
