= Lord of Laois =

Hereditary title in Ireland (1016–)

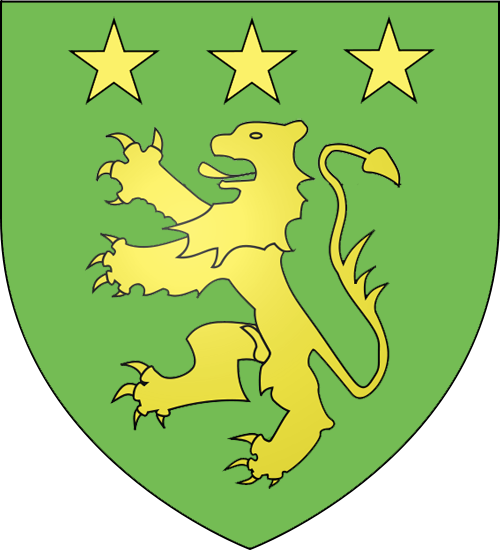
- Arms of the Lord of Laois Arms of O'More: Vert a lion rampant and in chief three mullets Or
- Seats: Dunamase Castle, later Balyna
- Motto: Cu Reu Bhaid ("The hounds to victory")

Lord of Laois is a title that was historically associated with County Laois (formerly the minor kingdom of Loígis) in Ireland. It was held by members of the O'More family. The title is recorded, as "lord of Laeighis", in the Annals of the Four Masters, the first mentioned being Oghran or Odhran (fl. 926–931), and the first with a surname being Cearnach Ua Mordha (O'More, d. 1017).

== History ==
Lords of Laois (non-inclusive list)
Anglicised name	Irish-language name	Reign	Lifespan	Notes	Citations
Lysaght O'More	Laoiseach Ó Mórdha		died 1342		
Conall O'More	Conall Ó Mórdha	1342–1348	died 1348	Lysaght's son	
Rory O'More	Ruaidhrí Ó Mórdha		died 1354	Slain by his own kinsmen and household	
Maolsheachlainn O'More		c.1370–1398	died 1398		
Gillapatrick O'More	Giolla Pádraig Ó Mórdha	c.1398–1420	died 1420		
Kedagh O'More	Céadach Ó Mórdha		died 1464	Died of the plague	
Donnell O'More	Domhnall Ó Mórdha		died 1467		
Uaithne O'More	Uaithne Ó Mórdha	1467–c.1487	died c.1487		
Conall mac David O'More		began c.1487	died 1493	Succeeded his uncle Uaithne	
Kedagh O'More	Céadach Ó Mórdha		died 1523	Son of Lisagh O’More	
Connell O'More	Connell Ó Mórdha	1523–1537	died 1537		
Peter O'More	Piaras Ó Mórdha	1537–1538		Succeeded his brother; was exiled from Laois by his nephews	
Kedagh Roe O'More	Céadach Ruadh Ó Mórdha	1538–1542	died 1542	Killed by Gaelic warlord Domhnall MacMurrough Kavanagh	
Rory Caoch O'More	Ruaidhrí Caoch Ó Mórdha	1542–1547	c.1515–1547	Killed by brother Giolla Pádraig's forces	
Gilla Patrick O'More	Giolla Pádraig Ó Mórdha	1547–1548	died c. December 1548	Died during imprisonment in London	
Conall Oge O'More	Conall Óg Ó Mórdha	1548–1557	died 1557	Crucified in Leighlinbridge	
Rory Oge O'More	Ruairí Óg Ó Mórdha	1557–1578	c.1544–30 June 1578	Succeeded his uncle	
James O'More	Seamus Ó Mórdha	began 1578		Son of Rory Caoch O'More's brother Lysaght	
Owny MacRory O'More	Uaithne mac Ruairí Ó Mórdha	1594–1600	c.1575–August 1600		
Owny MacShane O’More	Uaithne mac Séan Ó Mórdha	began 1600			

== See also ==
- Calvagh O'More
- Richard More O'Ferrall
