= Richard Tyrrell =

Anglo-Irish Lord of Norman ancestry

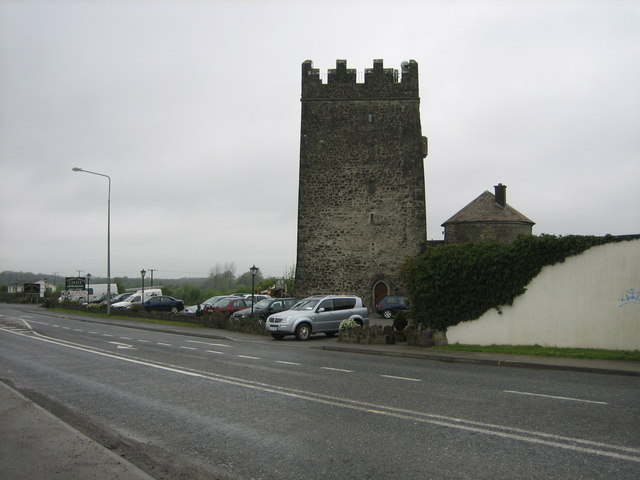
Tyrrellspass Castle, which belonged to Tyrrell's Old English family

Richard Tyrrell (c. 1545 - after 1632) was an Anglo-Irish Lord of Anglo-Norman ancestry who commanded rebel Irish forces in the Irish Nine Years War, most notably at the Siege of Kinsale. He was considered one of Hugh O'Neill's most accomplished allies.

== Family background ==
Born about 1545, (Note: The Dictionary of Irish Biography gives his birthdate as c. 1570. However, he is recorded in 1565 being accused of Garrot Nugent's death, and he was also raised with Charles O'Connor, who was born c. 1540.) Tyrrell was a member of the Old English Tyrrell family. The Tyrrells were the Lords of Fartullagh, a barony in County Westmeath based on the village of Tyrrellspass, and had held this position since the time of Henry II.

Sources differ on Tyrrell's upbringing and the identity of his immediate family. The Annals of the Four Masters names his father as Thomas Oge Tyrrell, son of Richard. However, he may have been born in Spain, the son of Phillip Tyrrell and his Spanish wife.

Richard Tyrrell had a brother, William, who assisted him in negotiations with the English in 1600. He was also foster-brother to Charles O'Connor of Uí Failghe, an Irish rebel known to the Spanish as "Don Carlos". O'Connor is sometimes mistaken for Prince Carlos, heir apparent to King Philip II of Spain.

== Early military career ==
Tyrrell saw military service for the English-backed Crown forces in Ireland. In 1565, he was falsely accused by the Earl of Kildare of the murder of Garrot Nugent, son of the Baron of Delvin. As a result, he subsequently allied himself with the Irish cause after spending some time in custody.

== Battle of Tyrrellspass ==
When the Nine Years' War commenced in 1594, Tyrrell became a commander of the rebel forces in Leinster under Hugh O'Neill, Earl of Tyrone. In 1597 the Crown forces commenced a new campaign, involving a three-pronged attack on Ulster, aiming to link up in Ballyshannon.

One force under Robert Barnewall, with 1000 men from the Pale, marched from Mullingar towards Tyrell's small band of 300 men. Despite Barnewall's great numbers, Tyrrell managed to ambush the force by leading Barnewall into thick woods, then attacking them from the front whilst his lieutenant O'Connor attacked from the rear. Only one man escaped, and Barnewall was taken as a prisoner for O'Neill. The location of the battle became known as Tyrrellspass.

In recognition of his military victories, Súgán Earl James FitzThomas FitzGerald appointed Tyrrell Colonel General of O'Neill's Munster forces.

== Defeat by Baron Mountjoy ==
In June 1600, Tyrrell and his brother William negotiated with an English emissary for a pardon from Queen Elizabeth I. Despite his loyalty to O'Neill, Tyrrell elected to keep these negotiations secret. The same year, Lord Deputy Baron Mountjoy was sent to Ireland by the Queen to quell the rebellion.

Tyrrell had established himself at "Tyrrell's Island" - a bog in Westmeath, the exact location of which is not known - with a force of 400 men. Mountjoy besieged "Tyrrell's Island", but Tyrrell escaped and joined O'Neill in Ulster.

In December 1601, Tyrrell captured Killurie Castle and Walter Castle, in Firceall and Upper Ossory, respectively.

== Battle of Kinsale ==
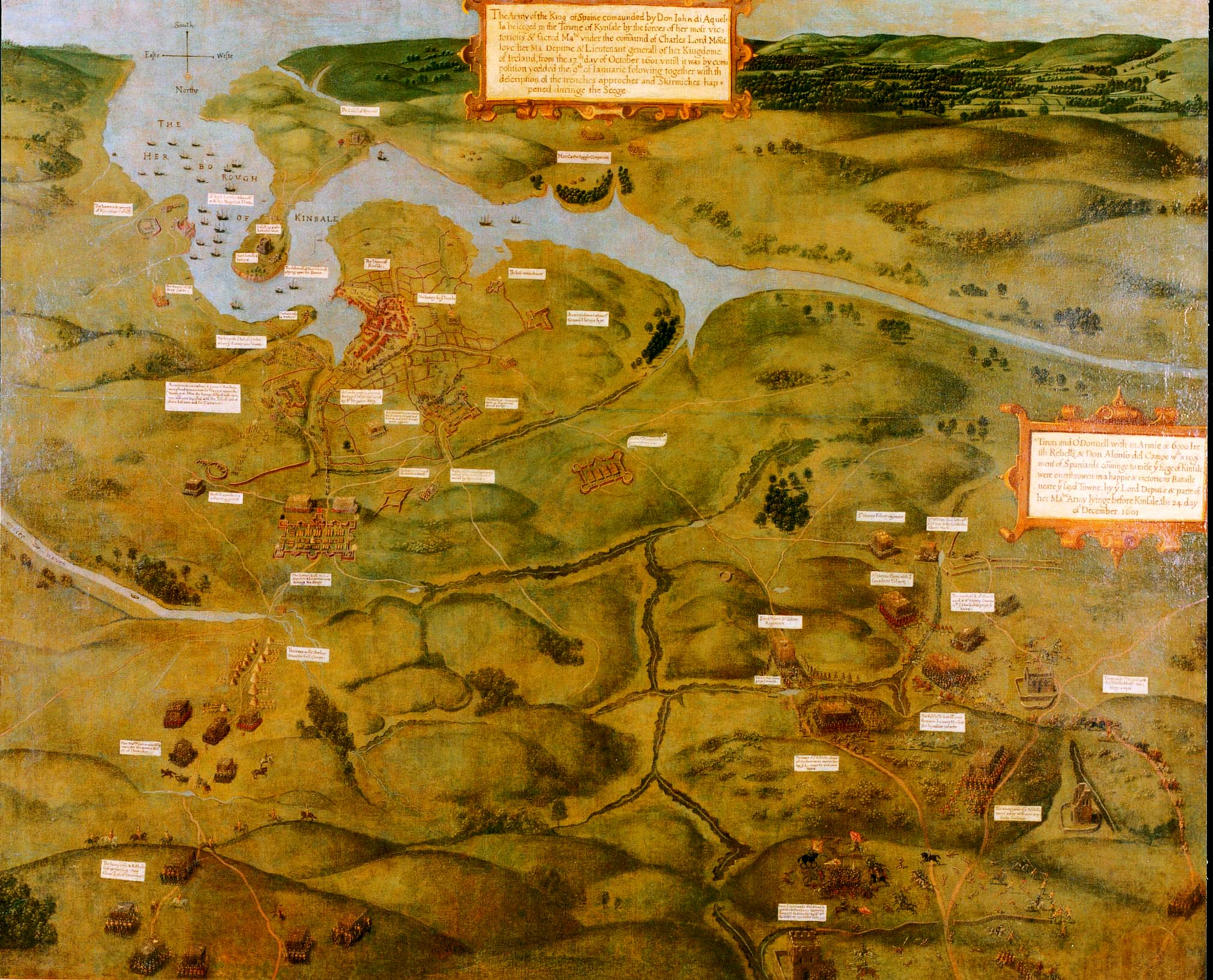
Map of the Siege of Kinsale, where Tyrrell's military career largely ended

Captain Richard Tyrrell joined Hugh Roe O'Donnell on his march southwards to Kinsale where a Spanish armada had landed in September. On 3 January 1602, the battle of Kinsale began between the Irish Gaelic and English Tudor forces. During the battle, Tyrrell commanded an infantry squadron of 600 men - 400 of his own troops, plus 200 Spanish soldiers commanded by Captain Alonso de Ocampo.

The English emerged victorious in the battle, and Tyrrell's troops, like the rest of the confederate forces, faced a decisive defeat. O'Neill retired to Ulster and Tyrrell decided to submit to George Carew, Lord President of Munster, after which he retired to County Cavan with his brother William.

== Later life ==
Around 1601, Tyrrell married Doryne O'More, daughter of Irish noble Rory O'More. They had four children - Richard, Catherine, Annabel and Elish. Catherine married famed physician Owen O'Shiel.

One source suggests he may have married a woman named Maud which whom he had two children, Godfrey and Rita.

In 1632, he was detained by authorities while heading to Flanders. Tyrrell had raised a company of 100 men, to be commanded by his son Richard, to ship from Dublin to Dunkirk. Allegedly, he had a contract with captain Thomas Preston of the Army of Flanders. Tyrrell and his son were questioned by the English administration, and eventually dismissed back to Ireland.

In his old age, he became known as "Old Captain Tyrell."

== Death ==
The date and circumstances of Tyrrell's death are unknown. According to the Dictionary of Irish Biography, he was last recorded in 1648 - though this would make him over 100 years old.
