= Owen O'Shiel =

Irish physician (1584–1650)

- Born: 1584; Moycashel, County Westmeath, Ireland
- Died: June 21, 1650 (aged 65–66); Near Letterkenny, County Donegal, Ireland
- Other names: The Eagle of Doctors (Iolar na nDochtúirí)
- Spouse: Catherine Tyrrell

Owen O'Shiel (Irish: Eoghan Ó Siadhail; 1584 – 21 June 1650) was an Irish physician. He was the chief military surgeon of the Irish Catholic Confederation from 1642 to 1650, during which he was personal physician to military leader Owen Roe O'Neill.

O'Shiel was born into an Irish medical family. He left the country around 1604 to study medicine in Paris, Leuven and Padua. Famously known as the "Eagle of Doctors" (Irish: Iolar na nDochtúirí), O'Shiel gained renown for his extensive medical expertise and high level of education, becoming highly sought after among the Leinster populace. A particularly staunch Catholic, he joined the Confederate Army and served under Owen Roe O'Neill in the Irish Rebellion of 1641. O'Shiel died at the Battle of Scarrifholis in 1650.

== Family background ==
The O'Shiels were a family of physicians initially in service to the McMahon family of Oriel, the MacCoghlan family of Delvin, and later to the O'Neill family. Ballysheil in County Down was the family's hereditary estate. The Annals of the Four Masters reference the 1548 death of Murtagh O'Shiel, the best physician of his age in the surrounding county.

Having been stripped of his family's lands in Brosna, County Kerry, patriarch James O'Shiel moved to Moycashel, County Westmeath, where his son Owen O'Shiel was born in 1584. (Note: The 2009 Dictionary of Irish Biography gives his birthdate as 1596. This is unlikely, since it means he would have attended university aged 8.)

== Education ==
Around 1604, unsatisfied with his medical education in Ireland, O'Shiel left to study in Paris. After attending university there for a few years, he decided to take his degree in Leuven instead, believing that the Parisian institutions gave out degrees too liberally. He spent three years in Leuven studying the teachings of celebrated doctors Vanderheyden, Van Garet and Vieringhen.

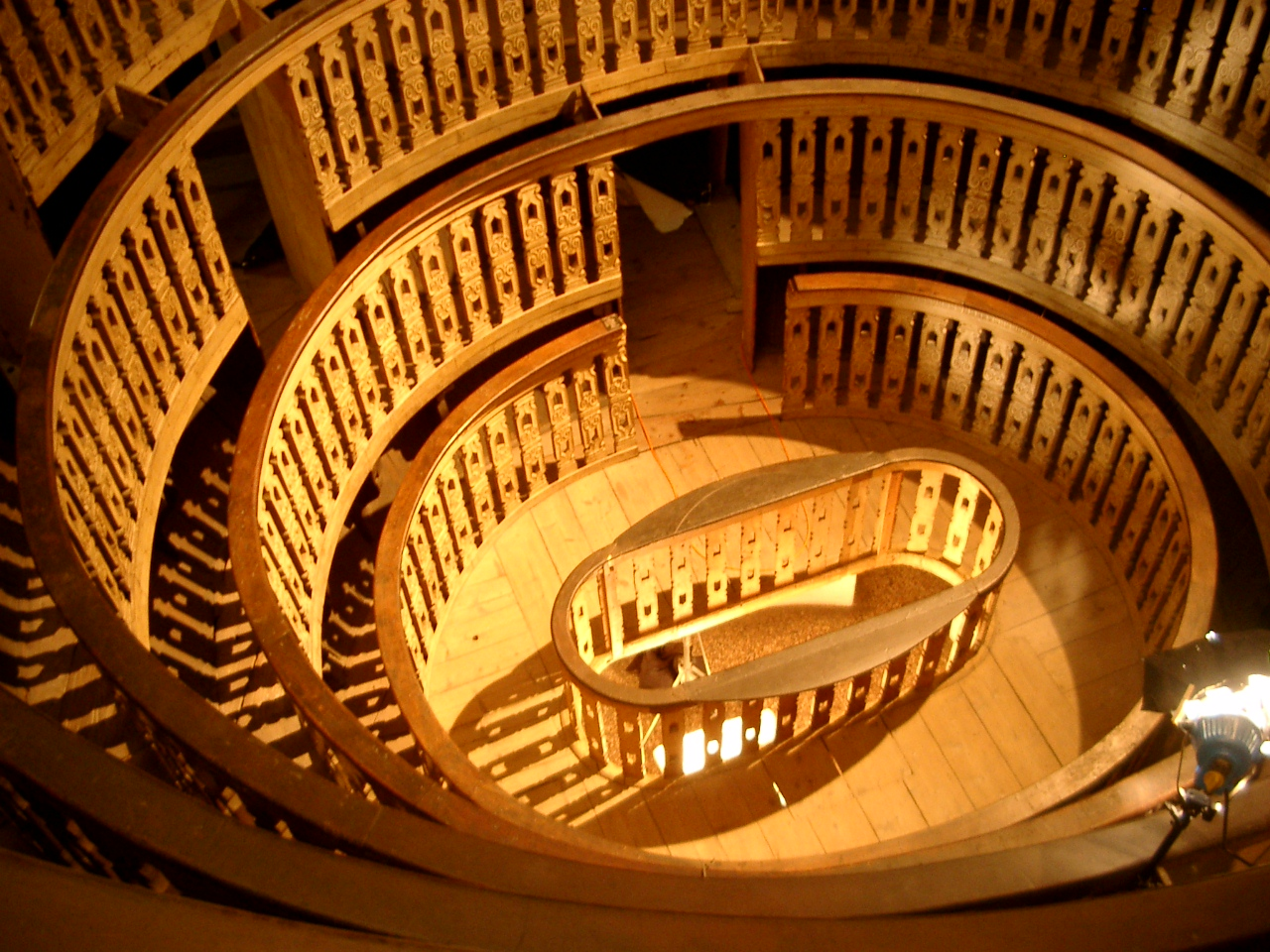
The anatomical theatre at the University of Padua, where O'Shiel received his second degree

O'Shiel then moved to Padua, whose university he considered the most prestigious and sophisticated in Europe. He remained there for an entire year, "observing the chief practitioners and anatomists [and] attending the lectures of the first chirurgeons, apothecaries and herbalists." O'Shiel's reputation grew and he received the degree of doctor.

He then spent half a year in Rome conversing with the best expositors of Galen and Hippocrates.

== Early career ==
In 1618, O'Shiel was recorded leaving Ireland for the Spanish Netherlands. In the Spanish Netherlands, O'Shiel was appointed as chirurgeon-doctor to the army of sovereigns Albert VII and Isabella. O'Shiel also studied medicine at the University of Douai (which then belonged to the Spanish Netherlands) and remained at Douai for three years.

O'Shiel's extensive education was duly noted, and he was quickly nominated chief of the busy royal hospital in Mechelen, where he worked for twelve years. It is unclear whether this was during his time in the Spanish Netherlands in the 1610s or 1630s.

Feeling homesick, he attempted to return to Ireland in 1621, but was detained at Dover in southern England. As a devout Catholic, he refused to take an oath of allegiance to England's Protestant King James I. A contemporary record states that O'Shiel was dressed very shabbily and had little money (30 shillings), but he was eventually released and made his way back to Ireland. He settled in Dublin.

Back in Ireland, O'Shiel cured a seriously ill woman who had been left for dead by many other doctors. Though her identity is unknown, it is apparent she was a person of great significance, as O'Shiel's services suddenly became highly in-demand by both fellow physicians and potential patients - particularly the Leinster nobility. This did not extend to members of the Anglo-Irish Protestant Ascendancy, who preferred Protestant physicians aligned with the Crown. Nevertheless, O'Shiel's expertise became well-known, making him a celebrity throughout Ireland. He became known as the "Eagle of Doctors" ("Iolar na nDochtúirí"). O'Shiel received an annual pension from the Leinster nobility which would have allowed him financial independence.

== Military career ==
By 1631, O'Shiel had returned to the Spanish Netherlands and become the doctor to the regiment of Shane O'Neill, 3rd Earl of Tyrone, a position he held for at least two years. In 1638, he was doctor to the regiment of Owen Roe O'Neill. O'Shiel may have been present at the Siege of Arras in 1640.

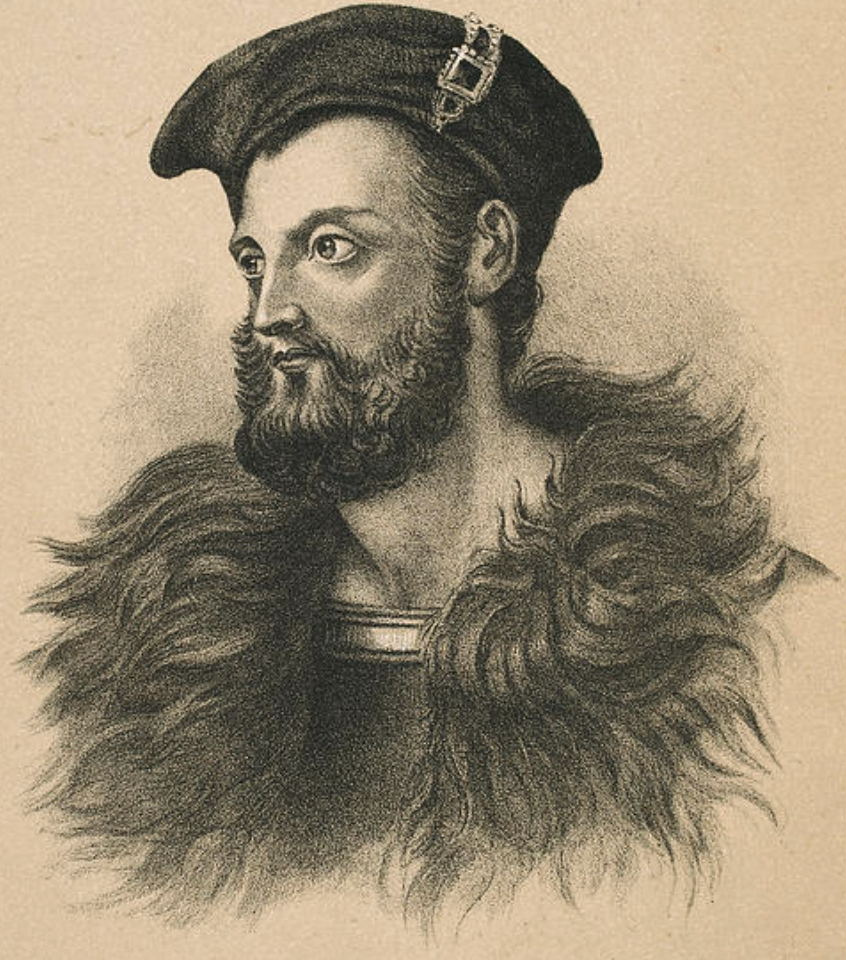
O'Shiel served as personal physician to Owen Roe O'Neill

The Irish Rebellion began in October 1641. O'Shiel was well-known to military leaders Owen Roe O'Neill and Thomas Preston from his time in the Spanish Netherlands, and the two men solicited O'Shiel's assistance. O'Shiel decided he would return to Ireland. Because O'Shiel was a native of Leinster, he joined Preston's Leinster army as Chief Doctor of Physic rather than O'Neill's Ulster army. O'Shiel probably returned to Ireland in September 1642 alongside Preston.

O'Shiel served with the Leinster army throughout the early years of the rebellion, providing medical assistance to injured soldiers. He marched with Preston to the siege of Dungannon—one of Preston's most significant campaigns. However, in August 1646, the two men had a falling out. O'Shiel was affronted by Preston's alcoholism. Additionally Preston had neglected to support O'Neill in a planned combined attack on Dublin, and was apathetic towards the Ormond Peace. With his confidence in Preston lost, O'Shiel left his post and joined the Confederate Ulster army, reuniting with Owen Roe O'Neill as the general's personal physician. Two years later Preston joined the Duke of Ormond's royalist faction and opposed O'Neill and O'Shiel.

O'Neill gave O'Shiel the castle of Woodstock upon gaining control of Athy, County Kildare. In 1648, O'Shiel's wife Catherine defended the castle against Preston, who threatened to hang her husband's nephew Hugh if she did not surrender. Certain staff officers intervened and Hugh was instead held in custody. Hugh was released after Preston received an uncompromising warning from O'Neill.

O'Shiel served under O'Neill throughout the whole of 1648, though he was absent when O'Neill fell ill in Derry in August 1649. When O'Shiel arrived in O'Neill's presence, the general had been ill for at least a month, probably from gout. He was present at O'Neill's death outside Cloughoughter Castle in November 1649. O'Shiel remained faithful to the O'Neill family, and resolved to carry on with his post in the Ulster army under the service of O'Neill's son Henry Roe.

== Marriage ==
Sometime after his return to Ireland, but before 1648, O'Shiel married Catherine Tyrrell, daughter of Anglo-Irish captain Richard Tyrrell and grand-daughter of Irish clan chief Rory O'More. According to historian J Duffy, Catherine inherited "the chivalrous fidelity of her father". O'Shiel and Catherine had multiple children, though their names have not been recorded.

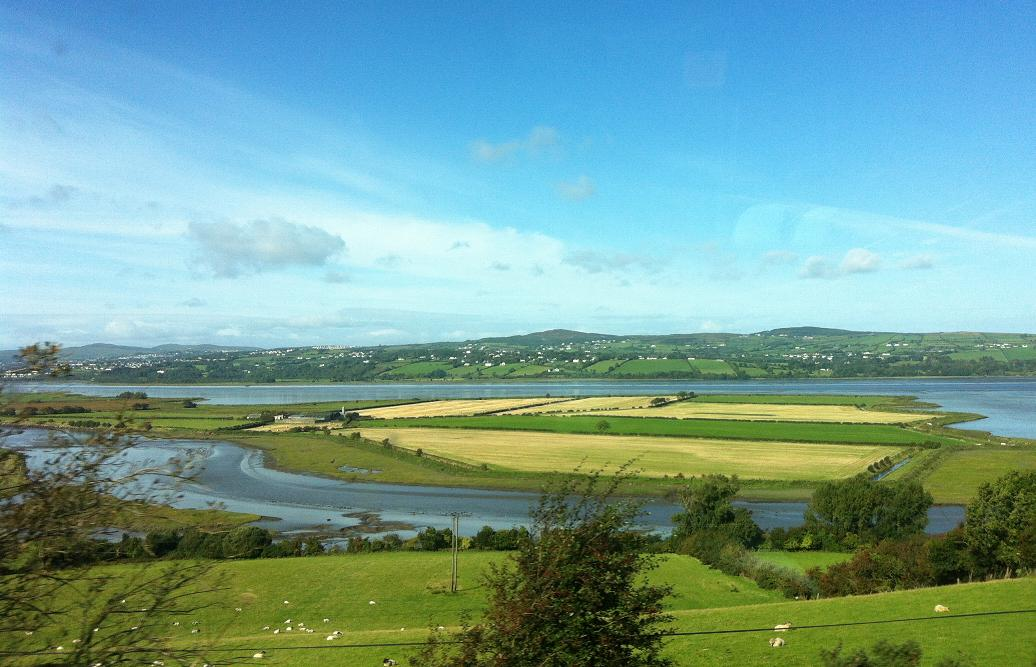
O'Shiel died in battle near Letterkenny

== Death and legacy ==
On 21 June 1650, Owen O'Shiel was killed in the Battle of Scarrifholis near Letterkenny, where the Confederacy Army was defeated. He was found among the slain, heavily scarred and mutilated.

An eminent physician surnamed Shiel—possibly a descendant of Owen O'Shiel—resided in Ballyshannon in 1889.
