= Rory O'More =

Irish noble (died 1578)

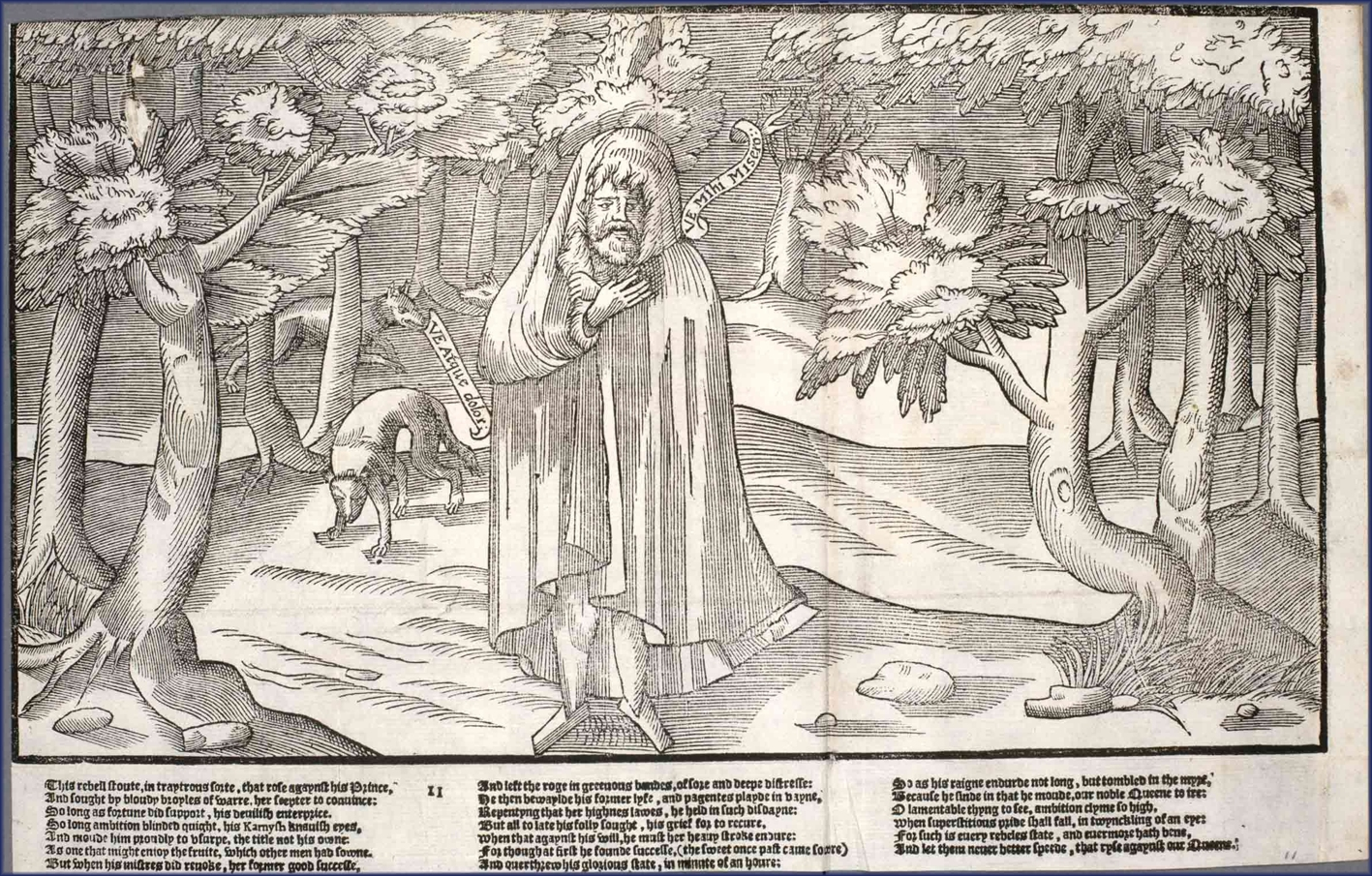
- O'More depicted in The Image of Irelande, with a Discoverie of Woodkarne, c. 1581

Lord of Laois
- Reign: 1557 – 1578
- Predecessor: Conall Óg O'More
- Successor: James O'More
- Born: c. 1544; Ireland
- Died: 30 June 1578 (aged ~34); Ireland
- Spouse: Margaret O'Byrne (m. 1573; died 1577)
- Issue: Owny MacRory O'More; Fiach O'More; Remainn O'More; Doryne Tyrrell (née O'More)
- House: O'More clan
- Father: Rory Caoch O'More

Rory Oge O'More (Irish: Ruairí Óg Ó Mórdha; c. 1544 – 30 June 1578) was an Irish noble and chief of the O'More clan. As the Lord of Laois, he rebelled against the Tudors' sixteenth-century conquest of Gaelic Ireland.

O'More is considered the greatest obstacle to Elizabeth I's conquest of the Irish midlands. He was killed by troops led by his loyalist cousin Barnaby Fitzpatrick, 2nd Baron Upper Ossory.

== Early life ==
Born around 1544, Rory O'More was the son of Rory Caoch O'More, Lord of Laois. His family were Chiefs of one of the most important Irish clans.

His mother was either his father's first wife, the daughter of Tadhg O'Dunne, or his second wife, Margaret, daughter of Thomas Butler and granddaughter of Piers Butler, eighth earl of Ormond. (Note: Margaret's father was Thomas Butler (b. 1498), younger brother of James "The Lame" Butler (b. 1496), 9th earl of Ormonde. This is a different Thomas Butler than "Black Tom," 10th earl of Ormonde born in 1531 and James' first child and Red Piers' grandson. "Black Tom" was fostered in the O'More household in the years leading up to 1544 when he was sent to London to live with his father's comrade in arms, Henry VIII and to be educated alongside Henry's son, Edward. It was around the same time (1543-1544) that Rory's father married Margaret Butler, so the timing would fit with Rory's birth later that year).)

Upon their father's death at the hands of his brother Giolla Pádraig O'More, it seems that Margaret removed Rory and his siblings from Laois. Giolla Pádraig died in the Marshalsea in 1548, and was succeeded by Rory's uncle Conall Óg O'More. In 1557, Conall was crucified in Leighlinbridge.

In 1556, Queen Mary I approved the Settlement of Laois and Offaly Act "..whereby the King and Queen's Majesties, and the Heires and Successors of the Queen, be entituled to the Counties of Leix, Slewmarge, Irry, Glinmaliry, and Offaily, and for making the same Countries Shire Grounds." This shired the new counties of Queen's County (now County Laois) and King's County (now County Offaly), thereby dispossessing the rest of Clan O'More and starting the Plantations of Ireland.

It is possible Rory was raised in England alongside his brother Calvagh. It seems he eventually returned to Laois around 1564.

== Return to Laois ==
The young O'More returned to Laois to find it had changed significantly. Since the death of O'More's father, many senior men of the O'More clan had died - either from illness, execution by fellow Gaelic nobles, or execution by the English authorities - and the English had established planters and government garrisons in the county. According to historian Emmett O'Byrne, this was "a land fraught with continual violence".

He quickly became friends with the Sheriff of Laois, Englishman Sir Francis Cosby. O'More and Cosby extorted fees from both plantation owners and their Gaelic rivals. However their friendship was disrupted when the planters hanged two cousins allied to Rory, and O'More began corresponding with Chief Hugh McSeán O'Byrne of Glenmalure. O'Byrne saw O'More's rebellious ambitions as an opportunity to increase the O'Byrne family's power in Leinster.

Peter Kerr-Smiley alleges in The Peril of Home Rule (1911) that O'More founded the Ancient Order of Hibernians in 1565.

O'More received a pardon on 17 February 1566, and in March the 11th Earl of Kildare was granted a commission to make war upon the O'More clan. It seems O'More became largely peaceful until 1570, when the government executed his cousin Lysaght for conspiracy at Leighlinbridge. This left Rory O'More as the principal leader of the O'More clan (excepting his cousin Murtagh O'More, Lord of Slemargy).

== Early rebellion ==
By April 1571, O'More was constantly engaged in rebellion. The English noted him as being particularly dangerous, and in 1572 he was fighting the Earl of Ormond and Queen Elizabeth. He was favoured by the weakness of the forces at the command of Cosby, the seneschal of Queen's County, and the temporary absence of Ormond in England.

O'More allied with Fiach McHugh O'Byrne, Hugh O'Byrne's son, and the two men considerably terrorised the Pale. In April 1572 Fiach was implicated in the murder of Robert Browne, destabilising East Leinster. In August, Browne's father-in-law Sir Nicholas White, seneschal of Wexford, aggressively attacked Fiach and his allies. Much of Leinster was reduced to chaos. Rory submitted on 26 August, and he was pardoned that September.

The Butlers and the Fitzgeralds were united against him; but in November, when the Earl of Desmond escaped from Dublin, it was O'More who escorted him through Kildare and protected him in Laois.

In July 1573, the Earl of Kildare was granted commission to make war on the O'Mores and his allies, the O'Connor Falys. In November, O'More strengthened his alliance with the O'Byrne clan by marrying Margaret O'Byrne, daughter of Hugh.

O'More and Fiach again attacked the Pale in March 1574. The next year, the Earl of Kildare was charged with conspiring with the O'More and O'Byrne clans as part of a plot to become Lord Deputy.

Francis Cosby had become seneschal of Laois in 1572, and by now O'More considered Cosby to be his enemy. Cosby's enforcement of martial law incited further rebellion from O'More in 1576. O'More and his O'Connor Faly allies devastated Meath and the Irish midlands.

Rory O'More was involved in the Earl of Kildare's plans in 1574, and was taken prisoner by the English in November. However, he quickly escaped captivity.

== Submission and war ==
=== Submission to Sidney ===
The man who would order his killing, Lord Deputy Sir Henry Sidney, called O'More 'an obscure and base varlet'. When on his tour in 1575, Sidney wrote of him:

Rory Oge O'More hath the possession and settling-place in the Queen's County, whether the tenants will or no, as he occupieth what he listeth and wasteth what he will.

O'More was afraid of Sidney and his power. When he came into O'More's territory in December 1575, the two men met in Kilkenny Cathedral. O'More "submitted himself, repenting (as he said) his former faults, and promising hereafter to live in better sort (for worse than he hath been he cannot be)". A new pardon was granted to him on 4 June 1576.

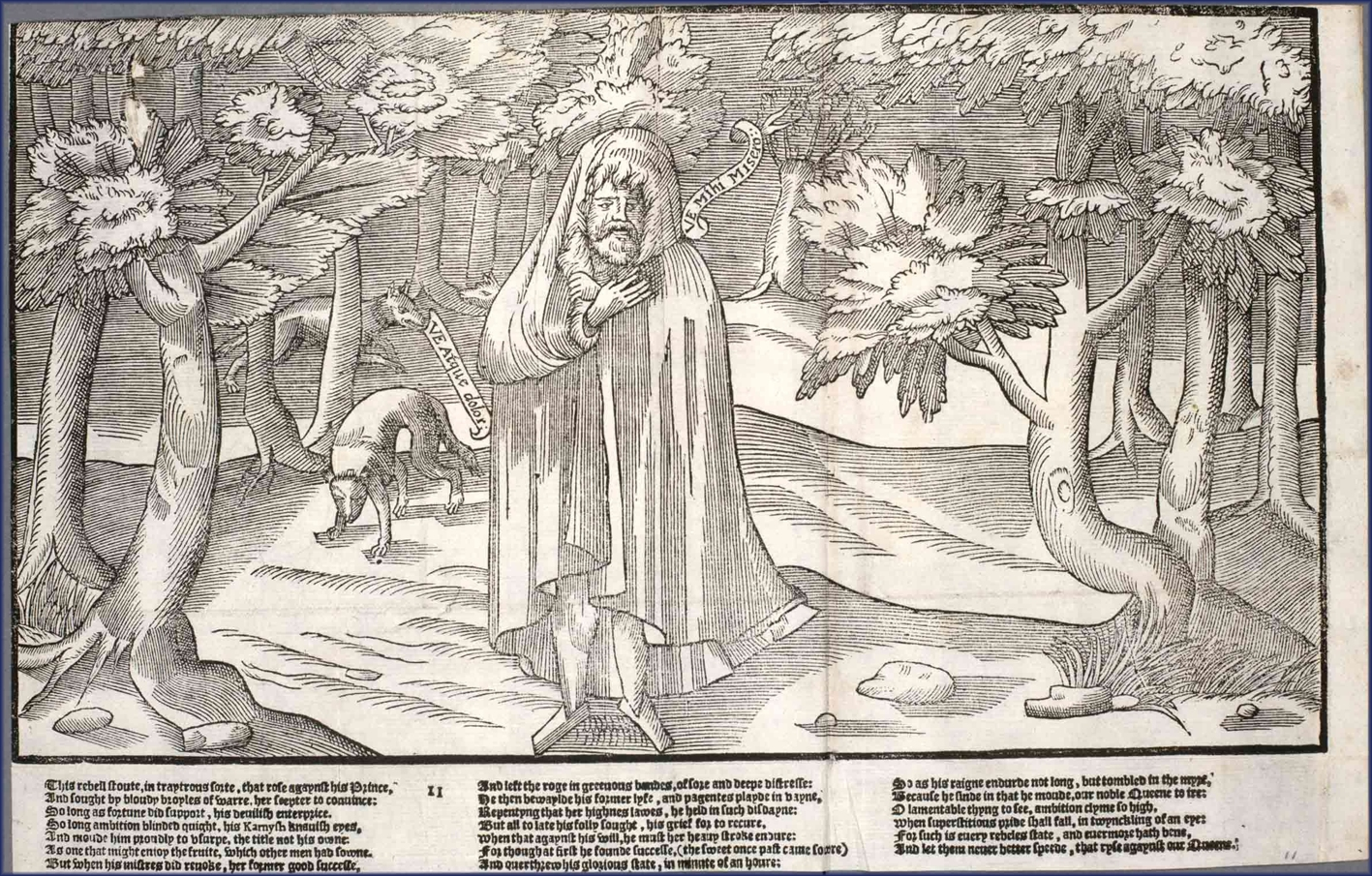
John Derricke's The Image of Irelande, with a Discoverie of Woodkarne, c. 1581. O'More is depicted in a forest with his hunting dog

=== The Massacre of Mullaghmast ===
Around New Year's Day 1577, a massacre of a group of Gaelic gentry by Sir Henry Sidney's troops took place at Mullaghmast in County Kildare. Sidney invited all of the Clan Chiefs and their derbhfine from Laois and Offaly to a peace conference at Mullaghmast. They arrived unarmed and were killed with their whole families by Sidney's troops, who had surrounded the castle. Estimates of the dead range from 40 (the number of Gaelic lords there) to hundreds. Among the dead include Rory's cousin Murtagh O'More, Lord of Slemargy.

=== Aftermath ===
O'More vowed to avenge the deaths of his relatives. He hoped for help from Spain, and with the backing of his friend John Burke, son of the Earl of Clanricarde, he prepared to retaliate for the massacre. He allied himself with the Clan O'Connor, and gathered an army.

On 3 March 1577 he burnt the town of Naas. Sidney wrote to the council later the same month:

Rory Oge O'More and Cormock M'Cormock O'Conor have burnt the Naas. They ranne thorough the towne lyke hagges and furies of hell, with flakes of fier fastned on poles ends. On 18 March, Francis Cosby was ordered to attack Rory and the Clan O'Connor "with fire and sword". In late March, Clans O'More and O'Connor avenged Mullaghmast with a raid into the Pale.

=== Kidnapping of Harrington and Alexander Cosby ===
In November O'More kidnapped two Englishmen, Sir Henry Harrington (Sidney's nephew, a privy councillor) and Alexander Cosby (governor of Laois, probably a relative of Francis Cosby), during a supposed parlay. He imprisoned them in chains in his house in the dense Gallen forests.

The English began negotiating Harrington and Cosby's ransom. One of O'More's huntsman fled to the English - enraged by a heavy fine O'More had inflicted on him - and arrangements were made to betray the Irish chief. Under cover of night, the huntsman guided English military leader Harpole and 200 soldiers towards O'More's residence, which was fortified by a large ditch. The soldiers blocked the house's two avenues, surrounded the door, and fired into the house. O'More awoke, drew his sword and struck Harrington and Cosby four or five times.

During the fighting, all of O'More's allies and family (including his wife Margaret and two of his sons) were killed, with the exception of O'More himself and his kinsman John O'More.

Rory O'More managed to fight his way out, having hacked Harrington to such an extent that Sidney saw Harrington's brains moving when his wounds were being dressed. O'More than rushed between a soldier's legs and escaped badly wounded and practically naked into the night. The English soldiers were struck with such fear that they believed O'More had compelled them not to touch him by magic.

O'More managed to find shelter with his brother-in-law Fiach.

=== Devastation in Carlow and Kildare ===
O'More spent time recovering. He took his revenge in early 1578 by ruthlessly devastating the Anglo-Irish towns of Co. Carlow and Co. Kildare, killing women and children alike. After one such raid he took refuge with the O'Byrnes in Glenmalure, to escape Sir Nicholas Bagenal's forces.

== Death ==
The Queen's agents had put an enormous reward for the time - £1,000 - on his head, as was their practice with Irish clan chiefs who resisted. In an attempt to entrap his loyalist cousin Barnaby Fitzpatrick, 2nd Baron Upper Ossory, O'More was cornered and killed by members of the Fitzpatrick family.

According to Philip O'Sullivan Beare, "500 English and Irish mercenaries under command of Fitzpatrick, chief of Ossory, invaded Leix. [O'More] led four hundred Irish against them, but before he came in sight, leaving his own men to reconnoitre the strength and position of the enemy, he fell by chance into their midst with only two companions, with whom he perished under many wounds. On hearing this news, [O'More]'s soldiers filled with rage rushed thirsting for vengeance against the enemy and routed them, and after many were slain the commander with difficulty escaped on horseback."

He died on 30 June 1578. Although his followers had managed to bury him, his body was exhumed and decapitated. His head was publicly displayed at Dublin Castle, which at the time was ringed by the severed heads on spikes of major 'rebels'.

O'More's cousin, James, son of Lysaght, succeeded him as Lord of Laois. With Rory dead, Fiach O'Byrne became the leader of Gaelic Leinster. Although the English administration was fearful of a revenge plot from Fiach, "for a long time after [O'More's] death no one was desirous to discharge one shot against the soldiers of the Crown".

== Family legacy ==
O'More and his unnamed first wife had four recorded sons. With his second wife Margaret O'Byrne, they had seven children, including Doryne, Fiach, Remainn and Owny. During Harrington and Cosby's 1577 rescue, their troops decapitated Margaret and paraded her head throughout the midlands.

John Burke took charge of Owny, and he became "as great a rebel as his father", eventually becoming Lord of Laois around 1594. After Owny's death in a skirmish in 1600, the O'Mores as an Irish clan were doomed.

== Appraisal ==
Irish nationalists Patrick Pearse and Philip O'Sullivan Beare characterised O'More as a patriot who fought against the tyranny of the English, who had established plantations on his family's land. Unionist Peter Kerr-Smiley claimed that despite O'More's ostensible duty to protect Catholicism in Ireland, he and his followers were "nothing more or less than a band of lawless brigands whose chief aim was to attack small towns or villages, burn the Protestant houses, and murder and mutilate the inhabitants".

== See also ==
- Rory O'Moore (1600–1655), after whom Rory O'More Bridge in Dublin is named
