= Battle of Gabes (741) =

Battle fought between the Berbers and the Umayyads

- Part of Berber Revolt
Date	741
Location	Gabes, North Africa
Result	Berber victory

Belligerents
Berbers	Umayyad Caliphate

Commanders and leaders
Ukkasha	Maslama ibn Sawada

Strength
Unknown	Unknown

Casualties and losses
None	Most of the army

The Battle of Gabes was a battle fought between the Berbers led by Ukkasha and the Umayyads who were led by Maslama ibn Sawada in the year 741. The battle was fought in the area of Gabes in present-day Tunisia.

== Background ==
It had been around two years since the war between the Berbers and the Umayyads began. The Berber Revolt had been so far successful for the Berbers especially after their defeat of the Umayyads in the Tangier expedition (740) and the Battle of The Nobles, where they managed to later isolate the Umayyad armies into Ceuta and begin the Siege of Ceuta. By then most of Northwest Africa had been retaken by the Berbers, with the Berber Revolution reaching areas such as present day Tunisia and Libya.

== Battle ==
Ukkasha who was in Gabes had rebelled against the Umayyads after Kulthum ibn Iyad al-Qushayri had left to attack the Berbers. Maslama ibn Sawada who was the Umayyad responsible for Kairouan went out with an Umayyad army to attack Ukkasha in Gabes. However, the Umayyads were defeated and most of the Umayyads were killed. Maslama ibn Sawada returned to Kairouan after his defeat, and Maslama ordered for Kairouan to be fortified under the leadership of Saeed ibn Bajra al-Ghassani.

== Aftermath ==
Ukkasha would then go to Algeria where he would encounter the other Berber commander Al-Hawwari in the Ziban region of present day Algeria, both decided to split apart and take different paths back into Tunisia. Ukkasha took a valley route while Al-Hawwari marched through the Awras Mountains.

== See also ==
- Berber Revolt
- Siege of Ceuta (741)
- Battle of Tubna
- Battle of Baja
