= Battle of Tubna =

- Part of Berber Revolt
Date	742
Location	Tubna, North Africa
Result	Berber victory
Territorial changes	Tubna is retaken by the Berbers

Belligerents
Berbers	Umayyad Caliphate

Commanders and leaders
Abd al-Wahid Al-Hawwari	Abd al-Rahman ibn Uqba al-Ghifari †

Strength
300,000	Unknown

Casualties and losses
Unknown	Unknown

The Battle of Tubna or Battle of Tobna was a battle fought between the Berbers led by Abd al-Wahid Al-Hawwari and the Umayyads who were led by Abd al-Rahman ibn Uqba al-Ghifari in the year 742. The battle was fought in the area of Tubna in present-day eastern Algeria.

== Background ==
It had been around two years since the war between the Berber's and the Umayyads began. The Berber Revolt had been so far successful for the Berbers especially after their defeat of the Umayyads in the Battle of The Nobles and Battle of Bagdoura, where they managed to later isolate the Umayyad armies from the territory of the Umayyads and besiege them Ceuta. By then most of Northwest Africa was liberated by the Berbers, which caused the Berbers to move eastwards towards areas where the Umayyads still had control.

== Battle ==
Ukkasha went west to seek aid from the Berber Caliphate, Al-Zanati, with who he had previously not met before. On the way, Ukkasha found Abd al-Wahid Al-Hawwari, who was sent to attack Kairouan. The two agreed to cooperate but marched east toward Kairouan but through different routes from the Ziban region, probably because it was difficult to supply their large forces. Ukkasha took a valley route while Abd al-Wahid Al-Hawwari marched over the Awras Mountains to the north.

Hanzala ordered Abd al-Rahman al-Ghifari to stop Abd al-Wahid Al-Hawwari eastern advance. The two armies met near Tubna in eastern Algeria on the 21st of September 742. Abd al-Rahman al-Ghifari was defeated and killed along with several other prominent Umayyad commanders, while his surviving troops fled to Hanzala who was in Kairouan. After this, Abd al-Wahid Al-Hawwari then captured Tubna and possibly other places.

== Aftermath ==
After the Arabs were defeated. Hanzala would send out yet another army under Thabit ibn Khaytham, a Syrian commander from the soldiers of Jordan with previous experience in North Africa. Thabit ibn Kaytham's Umayyad army met Al-Hawwari Berber rebels on the 4th December 742, at the Battle of Baja but Ibn Kaytham would also be defeated and killed by Al-Hawwari. Ibn al-Athir describes this defeat, in which the Umayyads lost many men as well as twenty thousand horses because of lack of fodder.

== See also ==
- Battle of Bagdoura
- Battle of the Nobles
- Battle of Baja
- Berber Revolt
