= Battle of Baja =

- Part of Berber Revolt
Date	742
Location	Baja, North Africa
Result	Berber victory
Territorial changes	Tunis and its naval bases are retaken by the Berbers

Belligerents
Berbers	Umayyad Caliphate

Commanders and leaders
Abd al-Wahid Al-Hawwari	Thabit ibn Khaytham †

Strength
300,000	40,000

Casualties and losses
None	20,000

The Battle of Baja was a battle fought between the Berbers led by Abd al-Wahid Al-Hawwari and the Umayyads who were led by Thabit ibn Khaytham in the year 742. The battle was fought in the area of Baja in present-day Tunisia.

== Background ==
It had been around two years since the war between the Berber's and the Umayyads began. The Berber Revolt had been so far successful for the Berbers especially after their defeat of the Umayyads in the Battle of The Nobles and Battle of Bagdoura, where they managed to later isolate the Umayyad armies from the territory of the Umayyads and besiege them Ceuta. By then most of Northwest Africa was liberated by the Berbers, which caused the Berber Caliph, Al-Zanati to send Al-Hawwari on an eastern offensive to move eastwards towards areas where the Umayyads still had control of North Africa.

== Battle ==
After the Arabs led by Abd al-Rahman al-Ghifari were defeated in the Battle of Tubna. Hanzala sent out yet another army under Thabit ibn Khaytham, a Syrian commander from the soldiers of Jordan with previous experience in North Africa. Thabit ibn Kaytham's Umayyad army met Al-Hawwari Berber rebels on the 4th December 742, where the two sides faced each other in trenches for a month at Baja in northwest Tunisia but Arabs were defeated and Thabit ibn Kaytham killed. Ibn al-Athir describes this defeat, in which the Umayyads lost many men as well as twenty thousand horses because of lack of fodder. The Umayyads lost twenty thousand horsemen in the battle and retreated to Kairouan with only twenty thousand.

== Aftermath ==
After the Arabs were defeated in both the battles of Tubna and Baja, Al-Hawwari would go on to capture Tunis along with the naval bases and declare himself the Berber Caliph, rivaling the current Berber Caliph, Al-Zanati. According to al-Raqiq, the defeated commander was ап unnamed person from the Banu Lakhm probably identical with Thabit, who Hanzala had sent forth with forty thousand troops to stop Abd al-Wahid Al-Hawwari, who had three hundred thousand men. The two sides faced each other in trenches for a month at Baja in northwest Tunisia before the defeat. Due to the Umayyad defeats, Hanzala wrote to al-Mustanir ibn Al-Нагіth al-Harashi, who was the governor of Tunis, which was the Muslim naval base against Sicily, telling him to evacuate the city and come to Kairouan if he thought he could not hold out. Al-Mustanir did not feel he could defend Tunis and therefore he escaped from Tunis his troops and their families to Kairouan, which shows the extent of the Umayyad's weakness in North Africa.

== See also ==
- Battle of Bagdoura
- Battle of the Nobles
- Battle of Tubna
- Berber Revolt
