= Siege of Ceuta (741) =

- Part of Berber Revolt
Date	741
Location	Ceuta, North Africa
Result	Berber victory
Territorial changes	Ceuta is captured by the Berbers

Belligerents
Berbers	Umayyad Caliphate

Commanders and leaders
Maysar al-Matghari; Hamid al-Zanati	Balj ibn Bishr al-Qushayri

Strength
Unknown	10,000

Casualties and losses
Unknown	Many soldiers starved

The Siege of Ceuta, or Siege of Sabta was an eleven-month siege by the forces of the Berber Caliphate against Ceuta which had been captured by Syrian contingents of the Umayyad army sent to crush Berber resistance. It began in 741 in the aftermath of the Battle of Bagdoura, where the Syrian faction of the Umayyad army escape destruction in the battle and then captured Ceuta in which they took refuge away from the Berbers.

== Background ==
For the past year, North Africa was embroiled in a war between the Berbers and the Umayyads. This was due to a revolt by the Berber's caused by oppression from the Umayyads. Due to the need for soldiers, the Umayyads created a monster for itself by arming and training a large number of Berbers, while at the same time oppressing the Berbers. All of the oppression by the Umayyads against the Berbers caused them to send Maysara Matghari, who would go onto become the first Caliph of the Berber Caliphate and leader of the Berber Revolt, along with a delegation to the Caliph Hisham in Damascus. At the end of it the Berber delegation was not even received by the caliph which eventually set the seeds of the rebellion.

== Siege ==
After the disastrous defeat in the Battle of Bagdoura, the remains of Syrian regiments of the Umayyad army, now reduced to some 10,000, were pulled together by Kulthum's nephew, Balj ibn Bishr and scrambled up towards the Strait of Gibraltar, where they hoped to get passage across the sea to al-Andalus. A small Ifriqiyan contingent, under Habib's son Abd al-Rahman ibn Habib al-Fihri, joined the Syrians in their flight, but the rest of the Ifriqiyan forces fled in a scattered way back to Kairouan. A portion of the Berber army led by Ibn Humayd and Abū Yüsuf, were sent off in pursuit of the fleeing Syrians. But the commander of Balj's rear, Hassan b. Ghunáàba or Atafa, turned on the pursuers, defeated them, and killed Abu Yusuf. Balj tried first to enter Tangier, but found out that it was controlled by the Berbers.

As the Berber army were chasing the Syrians, Balji led his forces into Ceuta. Inside Ceuta, the Syrians were trapped. Even though they were safe from direct Berber assault because of Ceuta defensive position, they had no way of escaping. However, they are reported to have defeated repeated Berber attempts to take Ceuta. Then the Berbers resorted to a scorched-earth policy, burning and destroying the land around Ceuta so that the Syrians would find no supplies even by foraging. Soon, the Syrians had to eat their horses to stay alive, beginning an eleven-month siege on Ceuta.

Balji begged the governor of Spain, Abd al-Malik ibn Qatan, to allow him and his men to come to Spain. But Abd al-Malik was naturally reluctant to let a foreign armed force into his Iberia. He was also backed up by Abd al-Rahman ibn Habib, who had also escaped the disaster at the Battle of Bagdoura separately from the others and managed to cross over to Spain. Abd al-Rahman ibn Habib strongly warned Abd al-Malik against allowing Balj and the besieged Syrian soldiers to cross into Spain. And in fact Abd al-Malik refused to even send the besieged Syrian soldiers supplies in Ceuta. The Syrian soldiers might have completely died off if a certain Arab in Spain had not sent them what he could in private. Even then, the Syrian soldiers were finally reduced to eating grass and herbs.

However, due to Berbers revolts in Iberia, encouraged by the success of Berbers in North Africa and in alliance with them. Berbers fought and drove the Arabs from Galicia, including Astorga, Marida, and Talavera near Toledo. After this campaign, Berbers seem to have held most of western Spain. This caused the Arab armies in Spain, from fear of being slaughtered by the Berbers, to withdraw toward their main bases in the center and south. They abandoned all the frontiers except that of Saraqusta in the northeast, where the Arabs had a majority. Abd al-Malik ibn Qatan sent out armies to the rebelling frontier zones, but they were soundly defeated.

This turn of events made Abd al-Malik ibn Qatan fear that the Arabs in Spain might soon meet the same fate as those in North Africa. This forced him to reconsider his Balji's pleas. Abd al-Malik ibn Qatan sent the latter supplies at long last and speedily negotiated a treaty with him. The treaty stated that the Syrians be brought over and maintained for one year, during which they were to fight for Abd al-Malik. At the end of this one year, they would leave Spain. Abd al-Malik would provide ships to transport them as a group to Tunisia where they would be far from the center of the Berber revolt which was now in the most western areas of North Africa.

== Aftermath ==
The Syrians under Balji managed to escape from Ceuta and cross the Strait of Gibraltar to fight in Iberia, saving the Syrians from total destruction. After this one-year period was done, the Syrians asked Abd al-Malik to transport them to Tunisia, however he said that he lacked the ships to transport them altogether, but he could send them in waves. The Syrians rejected this, most likely out of fear that the Syrians left behind could easily be robbed or killed by the Arabs in Spain. Then Abd al-Malik offered to transport them back to Ceuta, but they said they would rather be thrown into the sea than have to face the Berbers again and therefore they stayed to fight in Iberia.
