= Hanzala ibn Safwan al-Kalbi =

Umayyad governor of Egypt and Ifriqiya

Hanzala ibn Safwan al-Kalbi حنظلة بن صفوان الكلبي

Governor of Egypt
- In office 721–724
- Monarch: Yazid II
- Preceded by: Bishr ibn Safwan al-Kalbi
- Succeeded by: Muhammad ibn Abd al-Malik
- In office 737–742
- Monarch: Hisham
- Preceded by: Abd al-Rahman ibn Khalid
- Succeeded by: Hafs ibn al-Walid ibn Yusuf

Governor of Ifriqiya
- In office 742–745
- Monarchs: Hisham al-Walid II; Yazid III; Ibrahim; Marwan II
- Preceded by: Kulthum ibn Iyad al-Qushayri
- Succeeded by: Abd al-Rahman ibn Habib

Personal details
- Parent: Safwan ibn Tuwayl (father)

Military service
- Allegiance: Umayyad Caliphate
- Battles/wars: Berber Revolt: Battle of al-Qarn (742); Battle of al-Asnam (742)

Hanzala ibn Safwan al-Kalbi (Arabic: حنظلة بن صفوان الكلبي, romanized: Ḥanẓala ibn Ṣafwān al-Kalbī) was an Umayyad governor of Egypt from 721 to 724 and again 737 to 742, and subsequently governor of Ifriqiya from 742 to 745.

A scion of a prominent family of the powerful Banu Kalb tribe of Syria, he first served as the head of his brother Bishr ibn Safwan's shurta (select troops) in Egypt in 720 before being promoted to the governorship by Caliph Yazid II the following year. He was dismissed by Yazid II's successor, Hisham ibn Abd al-Malik, in 724 but reinstated in 736 to secure the province from the threat of a Byzantine invasion.

Five years later he was appointed to Ifriqiya to stave off the advance of the Berber revolt. The Berber rebels had taken control of the Maghreb from the Umayyads and inflicted severe losses on their Arab troops. Although the rebels made further gains and closed in on the Ifriqiyan capital Kairouan under Hanzala's watch, he recruited widely among the capitals civilians and dealt decisive blows to the rebels, defeating and killing their key commanders and killed large numbers of their forces. He consolidated the Umayyad position in Ifriqiya but never regained control of the Maghreb. In 745, he was ousted from Kairouan by the Arab nobleman Abd al-Rahman ibn Habib al-Fihri without a fight.

== Background ==
Hanzala hailed from the Banu Kalb, a powerful tribe in Syria and historically, the military mainstay of the Umayyad caliphs. Hanzala and his brother Bishr, sons of Safwan ibn Tuwayl, were direct descendants of the Kalb's famous pre-Islamic chief Zuhayr ibn Janab. (Note: Hanzala's descent from Zuhayr ibn Janab was traced as follows: Hanzala ibn Safwan ibn Tuwayl ibn Bishr ibn Hanzala ibn Alqama ibn Sharahil ibn Arin ibn Abi Jabir ibn Zuhayr ibn Janab.) His grandfather Tuwayl ibn Bishr was killed at the Battle of Siffin in 657 fighting under Mu'awiya I, the first Umayyad caliph. Hanzala's mother was a Christian.

== Governor in Egypt ==
In 720 Caliph Yazid II (r. 720–724) dismissed his predecessor's governor in Egypt and appointed Hanzala's brother Bishr in his place. Bishr installed Hanzala as the chief of the provincial shurta (select troops). Yazid made Hanzala governor of Egypt in April 721 after reassigning Bishr to govern the province of Ifriqiya (central North Africa). Rather than reside in the capital Fustat, Hanzala governed from the port city of Alexandria. He executed Yazid's iconoclastic policy, demolishing Christian statues and effacing paintings.

Yazid's successor, Caliph Hisham (r. 724–743), replaced Hanzala with his own brother, Muhammad ibn Abd al-Malik ibn Marwan upon his accession in 724. Hanzala was restored to office by Hisham in August 736 to strengthen caliphate's position there in response to Byzantine assault in 736. In 739, the Copts of Upper Egypt launched a tax revolt, which Hanzala suppressed.

== Governor of Ifriqiya ==
=== Suppression of Berber revolt ===
In December 741 or January 742, Hisham appointed Hanzala to Ifriqiya to salvage Umayyad rule in North Africa amid severe Arab troop and territorial losses in the Berber revolt. In the preceding months, Berber rebels had taken control of the Maghreb (western North Africa) and advanced on Ifriqiya. The traditional sources hold Hanzala raised a 30,000-strong army in Egypt which was reinforced by 20,000 Syrians sent by Hisham. The historian Khalid Yahya Blankinship deems these figures an exaggeration as Hanzala is later seen to rely mainly on the Arab garrisons in Ifriqiya. Nevertheless, Hanzala likely mobilized significant numbers of troops from Egypt and Syria, as indicated by the troop shortages in Egypt under his successor there. He embarked on the campaign in February 742, arriving in the capital and principal Arab garrison of Ifriqiya, Kairouan, in March or April. By then, Berber forces which had been closing in on the city had been repulsed to its environs by the city's defenders under Abd al-Rahman ibn Uqba al-Ghifari.

The Berber forces ranged against the Arabs in Ifriqiya were divided between those under Abd al-Wahid ibn Yazid, a Berber of the Hawwara tribe and lieutenant of Khalid ibn Humayd al-Zanati, the declared caliph of the Berbers, and Ukkasha ibn Ayyub al-Fazari, an Arab commander who had defected from the Syrian army and who led a largely Berber force. Ukkasha had been pushed out of Kairouan's vicinity and retrenched in Tobna in the Zab region of modern Algeria. Hanzala initially appointed his kinsman Abu'l-Khattar al-Husam ibn Dirar al-Kalbi to lead the campaign against him but the Ifriqiyan troops insisted on al-Ghifari, compelling Hanzala to appoint him instead, a reflection of the local garrison's strength vis-a-vis their Syrian–Egyptian counterparts. Al-Ghifari defeated Ukkasha and took up position in al-Zab, affording Kairouan a roughly six-month respite from Berber attacks.

In the summer of 742, Hanzala dispatched al-Ghifari to stem the advance of Abd al-Wahid but in the ensuing battle near Tobna on 21 September, al-Ghifari was defeated and killed, along with many of his lieutenants. Tobna and nearby places were captured by the Berbers, while the remnants of the Arab force retreated to Kairouan. Hanzala deployed a second force under Thabit ibn Khaytham, a Syrian commander of the Lakhm from Jund al-Urdunn who had combat experience in North Africa. Thabit too was defeated and killed in the Battle of Baja with Abd al-Wahid on 4 December and the Arabs undertook significant losses. In the aftermath, Hanzala redeployed the Arab garrison from the key naval base of Tunis under al-Mustansir ibn al-Harith al-Harashi to Kairouan; Abd al-Wahid thereafter occupied Tunis and proclaimed himself caliph (in opposition to the Tangiers-based Ibn Humayd). Umayyad rule in Ifriqiya had become effectively limited to Kairouan and the Arab troop numbers were severely depleted.

Hanzala recruited widely in Kairouan, mobilizing civilians, including all adult males and at least some women, and dug a defensive trench around the city. From this point, the sources differ about the sequence of Hanzala's campaigns against the Berbers as their forces closed in on Kairouan. Hanzala or his lieutenant Muhammad ibn Amr ibn Uqba launched a sortie against Abd al-Wahid in the city's environs, routing his forces and killing Abd al-Wahid at the Battle of al-Asnam. Before Ukkasha gained knowledge of his ally's defeat, Hanzala and his forces attacked his camp in the Battle of al-Qarn. These victories all likely occurred in January 743 and news reached Hisham in Syria before his death in February. Ukkasha was afterward captured and executed by Hanzala's order in April or May.

In the words of Robert Hoyland, "Hanzala remorselessly pushed home his advantage until all opponents had died or fled". Hanzala launched mop up operations against Berber rebels around Ifriqiya, ordering the governor of Tripoli to suppress the Berbers in the area of Nafzawa. Although he defeated them, the governor was slain and Hanzala dispatched his kinsman Zayd ibn Amr al-Kalbi to lead the Tripoli garrison back to their base. Hanzala staved off the Berber advance on Ifriqiya, securing Umayyad control there but he did not recover control of the Maghreb, which remained in Berber hands.

=== Affairs in al-Andalus ===
Under Hanzala's slain predecessor, Kulthum ibn Iyad al-Qushayri, Syrian troops led by his nephew Balj ibn Bishr al-Qushayri who survived the Berber onslaughts entered al-Andalus. There, they helped the governor Abd al-Malik ibn Qatan al-Fihri and the older-established Arab settlers turn the tide against the Berbers who had joined the rebellion. The Syrians soon after toppled and killed Abd al-Malik. The latter's sons and his kinsman Abd al-Rahman ibn Habib al-Fihri at the head of the local Arabs and Berbers moved against the Syrians but were defeated by Balj in battle. The latter died of his wounds in August 742 but his successor Tha'laba ibn Salama al-Amili drove the Syrians' advantage and routed the Andalusian Muslims. Tha'laba controversially enslaved many of the Andalusian Muslims, who appealed for Hanzala's intervention to restore peace and unify Muslim ranks in the province. Hanzala dispatched Abu'l-Khattar in November 742; he was accepted by both factions and set affairs in order; he deported problematic commanders, including Tha'laba and Abd al-Rahman to Ifriqiya and settled the Syrian and Egyptian troops across al-Andalus. Hanzala's deputy thus restored actual Umayyad authority in the province.

=== Departure ===
In 745, amid the Third Fitna which had roiled the Umayyad dynasty and its military backbone in Syria, Abd al-Rahman al-Fihri, who had been deported to Ifriqiya by Abu'l-Khattar, took control of Tunis. He demanded Hanzala surrender control of Kairouan. Due to religious reasons or undermined by the chaos in the caliphal center, he avoided war with Abd al-Rahman and left Ifriqiya for the east of the empire in February–March.

== See also ==
- History of early Islamic Tunisia
- History of medieval Tunisia

== Sources ==
- Basset, R. (1971). "Ḥanẓala ibn Ṣafwān al-Kalbī". In Lewis, B.; Ménage, V. L.; Pellat, Ch. & Schacht, J. (eds.). The Encyclopaedia of Islam, Second Edition. Volume III: H–Iram. Leiden: E. J. Brill. p. 169. OCLC 495469525.
- Blankinship, Khalid Yahya (1994). The End of the Jihâd State: The Reign of Hishām ibn ʻAbd al-Malik and the Collapse of the Umayyads. Albany, New York: State University of New York Press. ISBN 978-0-7914-1827-7.
- Caskel, Werner (1966a). Ğamharat an-nasab: Das genealogische Werk des His̆ām ibn Muḥammad al-Kalbī, Volume I (in German). Leiden: Brill. OCLC 490272940.
- Caskel, Werner (1966b). Ğamharat an-nasab: Das genealogische Werk des His̆ām ibn Muḥammad al-Kalbī, Volume II (in German). Leiden: Brill. OCLC 490272940.
- Hoyland, Robert G. (2015). In God's Path: The Arab Conquests and the Creation of an Islamic Empire. New York: Oxford University Press. ISBN 978-0-19-991636-8.
- Kennedy, Hugh (1998). "Egypt as a province in the Islamic caliphate, 641–868". In Petry, Carl F. (ed.). Cambridge History of Egypt, Volume One: Islamic Egypt, 640–1517. Cambridge: Cambridge University Press. pp. 62–85. ISBN 0-521-47137-0.
- Kennedy, Hugh N. (2004). The Prophet and the Age of the Caliphates: The Islamic Near East from the 6th to the 11th Century (Second ed.). Harlow: Pearson Education Limited. ISBN 0-582-40525-4.
- Marsham, Andrew (2024). The Umayyad Empire. Edinburgh: Edinburgh University Press. ISBN 978-0-7486-4301-1.
- Sijpesteijn, Petra (2004). "Travel and Trade on the River". In Sijpesteijn, Petra; Sundelin, Lennart (eds.). Papyrology and the History of Early Islamic Egypt. Leiden: Brill. pp. 115–152. ISBN 90-04-13886-2.
- Wickham, Chris (2005). Framing the Early Middle Ages: Europe and the Mediterranean, 400-800. New York: Oxford University Press. ISBN 978-0-19-926449-0.

Preceded by Bishr ibn Safwan al-Kalbi	Governor of Egypt; 721–724	Succeeded by Muhammad ibn Abd al-Malik ibn Marwan
Preceded by Abd al-Rahman ibn Khalid al-Fahmi	Governor of Egypt; 737–742	Succeeded by Hafs ibn al-Walid ibn Yusuf al-Hadrami
Preceded by Kulthum ibn Iyad al-Qasi and Balj ibn Bishr al-Qushayri	Governor of Ifriqiya; 742–745	Succeeded by Abd al-Rahman ibn Habib al-Fihri
