= Battle of al-Asnam =

742 battle in today's Algeria

- Part of the Berber Revolt
Date	742
Location	al-Asnam (near Qayrawan)
Result	Umayyad victory

Belligerents
Umayyad Caliphate	Berber rebels

Commanders and leaders
Hanzala ibn Safwan al-Kalbi	Abd al-Wahid ibn Yazid al-Hawwari †

Strength
Unknown	300,000 men

Casualties and losses
Unknown	180,000+ killed

The Battle of al-Asnam (Arabic: معركة الأصنام) was a military engagement between the Umayyad governor of Ifriqiya, Hanzala ibn Safwan al-Kalbi, and the Sufrite Berber insurgents led by Abd al-Wahid ibn Yazid al-Hawwari. The Umayyads decisively defeated the Berber army, saving Qayrawan and Ifriqiya from the Berber rebels.

== Background ==
In 742 AD, a large two-Berber army marched to attack Qayrawan, one led by Ukasha ibn Ayyub al-Fazari and the other by Abd al-Wahid ibn Yazid al-Hawwari. Urgent to meet Ukasha on the battlefield, Hanzala dispatched an army of 40,000 cavalry led by a Lakhmite to meet Abd al-Wahid, and fought for a month before they were defeated and lost half of their army. Hanzala defeated Ukasha at the battle of al-Qarn and executed him, but withdrew after suffering heavy casualties and prepared for Abd al-Wahid. In Kairouan, Hanzala recruited the inhabitants and armed them, and raised around 5,000 infantry and 5,000 archers. Hanzala also dug a trench around the city and is said to have wanted to retreat and write to the caliph for reinforcements after seeing the size of Ukasha's army.

== Battle ==
Hanzala marched to meet the Berbers in a place called al-Asnam, near Qayrawan. The Berbers were 3 miles away from Qayrawan, and they had a large army of around 300,000 men under Abd al-Wahid. When they lined up for battle, the Islamic scholars played a major role in urging the people of Qayrawan to wage jihad and fight the Kharijite Berber rebels, reminding them of what the Kharijites did to women by enslaving them, to children by making them slaves, and to men by killing them — so the men drew their swords from their sheaths. The women came out to encourage the men to stand firm on the battlefield. The Arab left flank was overwhelmed by the Berber right flank and was soon to break, however after a bitter fighting between both sides, the Arabs defeated the Berber left and the center. It was not long before the Arab left flank regained its position, repulsed the Berbers and pursued them to Djeloula, killing many of them in the battle. Abd al-Wahid's army was slaughtered. Due to the large number of dead, Hanzala ordered a count of the casualties, but the people were unable to do so until they counted them with reeds, and the number of Berbers killed amounted to over 180,000, including Abd al-Wahid. Abd al-Wahid's body was found and his head was decapitated and shown to Hanzala.

According to the American historian Khalid Yahya Blankinship, the claim by medieval Muslim sources (Note: Al-Raqiq al-Qayrawani, Ibn al-Athir and Ibn 'Idhari) that the number of Berber dead at al-Asnam were one hundred eighty thousand "is an exaggeration not to be trusted even in a vague way, as it may have been invented by the caliphal tradition to counterbalance the earlier record of utter failure in the Berber war."

Hanzala reported the victory to Caliph Hisham ibn Abd al-Malik, who was delighted to hear the news. Following the two Umayyad victories, Al-Layth ibn Sa'd is said to have remarked: "No battle has been more beloved to me since the Battle of Badr than the Arabs' battle of al-Asnam." It was said by scholars that "there is no massacre on earth greater than this."

== See also ==
- Tangier expedition (740)
- Battle of the Nobles
- Battle of Bagdoura
- Battle of al-Qarn
