= Arab migrations to the Levant =

Medieval migrations of Arabs to the Levant

Arabs migrated to the Levant, encompassing modern-day Syria, Lebanon, Jordan, Palestine and Israel, from ancient time to the modern period. The Arab migrants hailed from various parts of the Middle East, particularly the Arabian Peninsula. In the 9th century BCE, the Assyrians made written references to Arabs among the inhabitants of Levant and Arabia.

Several notable Arab kingdoms, peoples and principalities were established in the Levant since ancient times such as the Nabatean Kingdom in southern Levant 3rd century BCE, Itureans north of the Galilee in late Hellenistic period, in Palmyra Arabs alongside Arameans formed a major ethnic group of its native population. notable influential local Arab dynasties and kings also emerged from the Levant such as the Emesene dynasty in modern day Homs and the Roman emperor Philip the Arab.

Starting from late antiquity, several notable Arab tribes rose to prominence in the Levant such as Tanukhids whose main base during the time of their most famous ruler Queen Mavia was in Aleppo and the Ghassanids whose capital was in Jabiya.

Following the rise of the Rashidun Caliphate after Muhammad's death in 632 CE, Muslims captured Levant from the Byzantine empire, – known in Arabic as Bilād al-Shām – resulting in some settlement of Muslims from Arabia in urban areas. The conquest led to an urban depopulation in some regions, with some local residents fleeing, such as the Ghassanid Christian Arabs who fled to the Byzantine Anatolia, creating vacancies that Muslim migrants occupied. For the Jewish community, this marked the end of nearly 500 years of Roman rule and exile, as Caliph Umar allowed Jews to once again migrate and resettle back in Jerusalem.

The Umayyad era saw further settlement in the Levant, as the rulers aimed to maintain distinct tribal identities and manage demographics through population transfers. Estimates suggest that by the end of the 7th century CE, about 250,000 Arabs had settled in the Levant, a small minority among the native population. Later minor migrations across Arabs in the Middle East affected by political situations took place, some of which gave rise to prominent Druze dynasties such as banu Ma'an.

Despite having a substantial Muslim population in the Levant by 11th century CE, the Arabian Muslim migrants were only a small minority of this population, the vast majority of Muslims were indigenous converts. Genetic studies indicate a degree of genetic continuity between modern and Bronze Age levantines.

== History and migrations ==
=== Arabs presence in the region under the Byzantines ===
Before the Muslim conquest, the Arab presence in the Levant mainly consisted of Bedouin tribes inhabiting the borderlands and southern desert regions, including the Negev desert, the Syrian Desert west of the Euphrates, and the area around Palmyra. In contrast, the cultivated inner regions and cities of Palestine were predominantly populated by Christians, Jews, and Samaritans. Local kingdoms fortified their borders against nomadic incursions, but despite these efforts, varying degrees of penetration occurred. Local fears and concerns about the Bedouin are reflected in both Talmudic and Patristic literature, with the latter documenting Arab raids and acts of violence against monks. By the 5th century, Arab tribes had settled near Jerusalem, as noted by Cyril of Scythopolis, who described Petros Aspabetos, a tribal chief from Mesopotamia, converting to Christianity and settling in camps east of Jerusalem, where he maintained good relations with the Christian authorities. Trade relations also existed, with Meccan caravans traveling north, and Arab sources note that the Prophet's ancestors, including his grandfather Hishim and father 'Abdallah, engaged in business in Gaza.

Arab sources depict Byzantine-allied tribes such as the Banu Judham and Banu Ghassan as concentrated in Provincia Arabia (later known as Palestina Tertia), encroaching over the Levant's borderlands and on the frontiers of the Roman and later Byzantine Empires. In one Arabic source, the region is referred to as "al-Takhim", a term borrowed from Hebrew and most certainly used by Jews. The Banu Judham, the main tribe inhabiting the deserts south of Palestine, are associated with Shuaib in Arab tradition. Their Christian influences were notable due to their Byzantine connections, and while some members of the Banu Wa'il branch were connected to Judaism, only a few actually converted. The Banu Lakhm, who mingled with the Banu Judham and were based in the northern Euphrates, also had a presence in Palestine. The Banu Ghassan, or Ghassanids, a large federation of tribes, were important Byzantine allies against other Arab tribes. Migrating in significant numbers to southern Syria and northern Transjordan, they established a vassal kingdom under Byzantine authority, with their center in Jabiya, a settlement located in the eastern Golan.

=== Rashidun era (632–661 CE) ===
The Rashidun Caliphate, under Abu Bakr and Umar ibn al-Khattab, ascended to power following the death of Muhammad in 632 CE, rapidly expanding through military campaigns and conquering the Levant. Within three years, the regions of Syria and Palestine were under Muslim control. Muslims from Arabia began settling in the towns of Syria right after the conquest. This settlement was however limited, primarily involving members of the original conquering armies. Additional tribesmen who immigrated mainly settled in abandoned parts of towns, rather than in rural areas or new camp cities, as happened in Iraq. The numbers of Arabs who settled in the eastern provinces is unknown, but it is assumed they were a small minority among the native population, the total which was Bernard Lewis estimates as a "Quarter of a million" towards the end of the first century of Islam.

While the Arabs caused less destruction during their conquest than the Persians had few decades earlier, part of the Levant's urban population fled upon the arrival of Muslim forces. This migration created vacancies that were later occupied by Arab Muslim migrants. Both Arab and Syrian sources provide evidence of this emigration. Residents of Damascus, and coastal cities such as Sidon, Arca, Byblos, Beirut fled their towns. The Romans inhabitants of towns like Baldah, Jabalah and Antartus similarly deserted. Antioch's residents were given the choice to stay and pay tax or leave, and many chose the latter. Archaeological evidence, including a notable reduction in Caesarea's urban area, suggests that large-scale migration and depopulation occurred, especially along the Levantine coast; some Syrian cities also experienced substantial size reductions. It appears that the citizens of Emesa also departed, as an Arab commander allocated the abandoned houses and lands to Muslim Arabs. Some sources report Muslims entered into agreements with residents of various towns, which included conditions requiring the locals to vacate certain properties to accommodate Muslim newcomers. Often, these agreements specified that townspeople were to relinquish half of their homes and churches for use as living spaces and mosques. The abandonment of urban properties—whether due to flight, voluntary evacuation, or dispossession—led to their gradual occupation by Muslims.

Umar ibn al-Khattab honored a promise made by the Prophet Muhammad to Tamim al-Dari, an Arab from the Banu Lakhm tribe who converted to Islam and joined Muhammad in Medina, becoming one of his companions. In recognition of his service, the Prophet promised him lands in Hebron and Bayt 'Aynun (and, according to some sources, Bethlehem), along with a bill of rights. Umar ultimately fulfilled this promise, and Tamim seemingly served as the collector of land taxes (kharaj) in these areas. His descendants are reported to have continued residing there into the medieval period.

The Muslim conquerors established a primary military base in Jabiyah, an encampment in eastern Golan that was previously the capital of the Ghassanids. According to one source, the initial Muslim force that arrived in Jabiyah comprised about 24,000 soldiers. However, following the plague of Amwas, only 4,000 remained. It remains uncertain whether the remaining troops perished due to the plague or if many had fled and could potentially return. The Ghassanids, who preferred to remain Christian, were asked to pay land and poll taxes. Their leader refused, asserting Arab exemption from such taxes, and Umar ultimately conceded. Jabiyah was ultimately disregarded as a settlement site, as new arrivals favored cities like Damascus, Homs, and Aleppo. Unlike in Iraq and Mesopotamia, many, if not the majority, of the Muslim Arabs who came to Syria appeared to establish their homes in these urban centers, often occupying areas vacated by fleeing Christians.

Following the conquest, many Muslims acquired land grants and residences in various cities of the Levant. For example, Arab commander Amr ibn al-As owned multiple properties in Damascus. Arab commander Habib b. Maslama al-Fihri also settled in Damascus, where he had a dwelling overlooking the Barada River. In Homs, a general allocated vacant areas among Muslims: "divided it (the city) up among the Muslims in lots (khitat), so that they might occupy them, and he settled them also in every place whose occupants had evacuated it and in every abandoned yard." Additionally, some locals chose to surrender their homes to the Muslims and relocated along the Orontes River. In Tiberias, following the battle of Fahl and the fall of Damascus, commanders and their cavalry have reportedly settled in the town and the neighboring area. Later, additional reinforcements were distributed across nearby cities and villages. In Jerusalem, 'Umar settled troops in the city once its inhabitants had agreed to terms with him. Under 'Umar and 'Uthman, tracts of land in 'Asqalan were allocated to Muslims.

Following the Muslim conquest, settlement in the countryside of the Levant occurred, though it was less documented than in urban areas. Some Muslim troops were reportedly dispersed in towns and villages around the Jordan River. Reports indicate that abandoned agricultural lands were allocated to Muslims, with the condition that they restore the land to productivity and pay a tithe ('ushr) on the produce. Some references suggest that certain Arab immigrants had rural ties in Syria. For example, Saʽd ibn ʽUbadah, a leader of the Khazraj tribe, settled in Damascus but may have owned property in the Hauran. Mu'awiya, as governor, was directed by 'Uthman to settle Arab nomads (al-'Arab) in unclaimed or vacant lands far from urban areas, placing tribes like Banu Tamim in Rabiya, and the tribes of Qays and Asad in regions such as al-Mazihin and al-Mudaibir (near Raqqa). However, settlement in rural areas appeared limited, as most land available for Muslim settlers had been previously vacated, and few peasants fled during the conquest, likely due to economic reasons. Nomadic Arabs were also settled in vacant lands far from cities.

=== Umayyad era (661–750 CE) ===
The Umayyad Caliphate, which succeeded the Rashidun in 661, established its center in Syria and designated Damascus as its capital, thereby transforming the region into a major metropolitan province. The Islamic leaders aimed to preserve the distinct identity and traditional lifestyle of the tribes, incorporating Islamic elements while preventing their assimilation into local populations. This approach applied to both the Arab tribes in the Arabian Peninsula or previously living on the borders of Palestine and those who joined as part of the Muslim army, maintaining their separate status from the local inhabitants. Most of them were soldiers, officials, townsmen, or Bedouins.

The Caliphate also enacted some polices of "population management", including transfers and settlement. Starting in the early decades after the conquest, employed this practice both to populate newly conquered regions and to address demographic shifts. According to Al-Baladhuri, Mu'awiya settled Arab tribes and Persians in coastal Syria, and after the fall of Tripoli, it was "made a dwelling-place for a large body of Jews". After the conquest of Balis, he replaced the departing local inhabitants with Arab tribes that had just converted to Islam.

According to Moshe Gil, regarding Palestine, the Umayyad era was "undoubtedly the golden age of the Arab tribes who penetrated into Palestine with the Muslim conquest." He wrote that "These Arab tribes, both those who had formerly lived on the borders of Palestine and those who came to it within the framework of the Muslim army, were a separate entity of the population of the country". The situation in Palestine under the Umayyads is reflected in Ya'qubi's late and somewhat limited account, written in 892 and possibly based on Umayyad sources. Ya'qubi described a diverse mix of tribes in Jund Filastin, including the pre-Islamic Lakhm and Judham, and the post-conquest 'Amilah, Kinda, Qays, and Kinana. Ya'qubi reported that the Banu Judham resided in the area of Bayt Jibrin. The Nessana papyri list 59 clans and mention two tribes, Judham and Qays.

In the early 8th century, the city of Ramla was founded by the Islamic authorities as the capital of Jund Filastin. By 892, Ya'qubi described Ramla as having a diverse population of both Arabs and non-Arabs. It seems that immigrants were directed to new administrative centers by the government, playing a role in promoting Islamization and Arabization. He also infers that Yaqubi's description indicates that "although emigrating elites from principal cities left their luxurious properties behind, Muslim immigrants did not occupy them, an impression corroborated by archaeological findings."

According to Ya'qubi, the 'Amila tribe settled in Jabal al-Jalil (modern-day south Lebanon and northern Israel), with nearby Tyre inhabited by people of various origins. The 'Amila became the dominant group in the region, which was named after them. Some scholars suggest based on local traditions that the tribe was already Shi'ite upon settling in the 7th century.

Khirbet Abu Suwwana, an archaeological site in the northern Judaean Desert founded in the early 8th century was likely established by nomadic groups who penetrated the area after the Muslim conquest. Al-Tabari writes that Caliph Marwan I (r. 684–685 CE) faced pressure to honor his promise to the Banu Kindah, allowing them to settle in the Balqa region of Transjordan.

In 742, an Arab army led by Balj ibn Bishr was dispatched to Al-Andalus, with many of its soldiers originating from Syria. These soldiers later became settlers who received fiefs along the Mediterranean coast of Spain, adopting a model similar to that of Syria. Each of the Syrian military districts (junds) was allocated a corresponding Spanish region: the men of Damascus settled in Elvira, those from the Jordan in Malaga, Palestine in Sidonia, Hims in Seville, and Qinnasrin in Jaen. They formed an Arab warrior class referred to as Shāmi (Syrian). This designation helped differentiate them from the original settlers who had come with the initial invasion.

=== Fatimid era (909–1171 CE) ===
The Shi'ite Fatimid Caliphate moved or encouraged Shi'ite immigrants to settle in cities along the Levantine coastal plain, such as Tyre, as well as in Tiberias and its surrounding areas.

=== Crusader era (1099–1187 CE) ===
A large number of Bedouins were invited by the Crusaders to settle in the region of Samaria. The arrival of Bedouins and other Muslims led to the gradual replacement of the native Samaritan population, with some Samaritans possibly converting to Islam, while others joined other Samaritan communities, notably in Nablus. Bedouins also settled in the area around Sebastia, leading to a predominantly Muslim population there. Over time, the Bedouins transitioned from a nomadic lifestyle to becoming settled inhabitants of the region. As a result, much of the present population now lives in towns and villages. The Bedouin settlement could account for the tribal structure observed in parts of the rural society, known as the 'ushrān, to this day.

Ehrlich and Rubin state that Samaria was the only region in Palestine mostly Islamized prior to the Crusades and Mamluk rule.

Following Saladin's conquest of Jerusalem, Muslim migrants from the Maghreb responded to his call to settle in the city.

== Impact ==
=== Islamization ===
The Arab migrations played a key role in the Islamization of the Holy Land. As Christian, Jewish, and Samaritan populations gradually emigrated, large numbers of Muslim, predominantly Arab, settlers moved into the region. Over time, many non-Muslims who remained converted to Islam at different rates. Christian communities persisted in greater numbers, likely due to their larger size and better organization, while Jewish communities experienced a revival through immigration. In contrast, Samaritan immigration was minimal, and their presence dwindled over time.

== See also ==
- Arab migrations to the Maghreb

== Bibliography ==
- Abu-Husayn, Abdul-Rahim (1985). Provincial Leaderships in Syria, 1575–1650. Beirut: American University of Beirut. ISBN 9780815660729.
- Avni, Gideon (2014). The Byzantine-Islamic Transition in Palestine: An Archaeological Approach. Oxford Studies in Byzantium. Oxford University Press. ISBN 9780199684335.
- Donner, Fred McGraw (2014) [1982]. The Early Islamic Conquests. Princeton Studies on the Near East. Princeton University Press. ISBN 9781400847877.
- Gil, Moshe (1997). A History of Palestine, 634–1099. Cambridge University Press. ISBN 0-521-40437-1.
- Ehrlich, Michael (2022). The Islamization of the Holy Land, 634–1800. Medieval Islamicate World. ARC Humanities Press. ISBN 9781802700312.
- Lewis, Bernard (2002) [1950]. The Arabs in History. Oxford University Press. ISBN 9780192803108.
- Luxenberg, Christoph (2007). The Syro-Aramaic Reading of the Koran: A Contribution to the Decoding of the Language of the Koran. Verlag Hans Schiler. ISBN 978-3-89930-088-8.
- Southern, Pat (2008). Empress Zenobia: Palmyra's Rebel Queen. A&C Black. ISBN 9781441142481.
- Theodoropoulos, Panagiotis (2020). "The Migration of Syrian and Palestinian Populations in the 7th Century: Movement of Individuals and Groups in the Mediterranean". Migration Histories of the Medieval Afroeurasian Transition Zone. Studies in Global Social History, Volume: 39/13. Brill. ISBN 9789004425613.
