= Battle of al-Qarn =

742 battle of the Berber Revolt

- Part of Berber Revolt
Date	742
Location	Jabal al-Qarn, northwest of Kairouan, Al-Batin Village
Result	Umayyad victory

Belligerents
Umayyad Caliphate	Berber insurgents

Commanders and leaders
Handhala ibn Safwan al-Kalbi	Ukasha ibn Ayyub al-Fazari (executed)

The Battle of Al-Qarn was a military engagement between the Umayyad governor of ifriqya Handhala ibn Safwan al-Kalbi and the Sufrite Berber Kharijites led by Ukasha ibn Ayub al-Fezari, the Umayyads were victorious and Ukasha would later get captured and executed.

== Battle ==
the Umayyad armies in the Battle of the Nobles and Battle of Bagdoura were decisively crushed, hearing this, the Umayyad Caliph Hisham ibn Abd al-Malik appointed Handhala ibn Safwan al-Kalbi as the new governor of ifiriqya, it wasn't long before Oqasha was said to be mounting an attack, in coordination with another large Berber army coming in from the west, led by Abd al-Wahid ibn Yazid al-Hawwari. The Berber rebel armies were to make a junction in front of Kairouan, before launching their final attack on the city, Handhala wanted to delay Abd al-Wahid march so he can meet Ukasha's army, Handhala dispatched a cavalry force to slow down Abd al-Wahid's progress, and threw the bulk of his forces to meet Ukasha, they met in a place called Al-Qarn near Kairouan, the fighting was intense and heavy, both sides suffered heavy casualties until Handhala succeeded in defeating the Berber army, Ukasha was captured and executed. Handhala withdrew to Kairouan due to fear that Abd al-Wahid would reach it before him

== See also ==
- Battle of the Nobles
- Battle of Bagdoura
- Battle of al-Asnam
