= Habib ibn Abi Ubayda al-Fihri =

Arab military commander (died 741)

Personal details
- Died: October 741; Sebou River, near Fes
- Relations: Uqba ibn Nafi (grandfather); Yusuf ibn Abd al-Rahman (grandson)
- Children: Abd al-Rahman; Ilyas; Abd al-Warith; Imran; Ismail
- Parent: Abu Ubayda ibn Uqba

Military service
- Allegiance: Umayyad Caliphate
- Battles/wars: Umayyad conquest of Hispania; Umayyad conquest of the Sous; Muslim conquest of Sicily; Berber Revolt: Battle of Bagdoura (741) †

Habib ibn Abi Ubayda al-Fihri (Arabic: حبيب بن أبي عبيدة الفهري) (died October 741) was an Arab military commander of the Fihrid (or 'Oqbid') family who played an important role in the early history of Ifriqiya (Tunisia), al-Andalus (Spain) and Sicily.

== Biography ==
Habib ibn Abi Ubaida al-Fihri was a grandson of Uqba ibn Nafi, conqueror of North Africa. Habib was the scion of the Fihrids, the leading Arab aristocratic family of Kairouan.

Habib ibn Abi Ubaida participated in the 712 expedition of Ifriqiyan governor Musa ibn Nusair to conquer Spain. In 714, Habib was appointed alongside Musa's own son Abd al-Aziz as vice-governor in Spain. Ibn Khaldun alleges it was Habib who received the order and carried out the assassination of Abd al-Aziz in 716, and personally carried the dead man's head to Damascus, and presented it to the Caliph Sulayman.

Habib eventually returned to North Africa, and became one of the leading commanders of the Ifriqiyan army, particularly during the tenure of Ubayd Allah ibn al-Habhab as governor of Ifriqiya from 734. Obeid Allah, an inherent administrator, seemed to place great trust in Habib on military matters.

In 735, Habib ibn Abi Ubaida led the Arab armies in the conquest of the Sous valley of southern Morocco, bringing the Moroccan hinterlands more firmly within the Umayyad Caliphate.

In early 740, Habib headed a large Arab expedition to Sicily, in what was possibly the first attempt at a full-scale invasion of the island (rather than a mere raid). Habib had a successful landing and laid a brief siege to Syracuse, securing its submission to tribute.

The Great Berber Revolt in the western Maghreb Morocco broke out during Habib's absence. It seems the Berber leader Maysara al-Matghari delayed the start of the uprising until Habib had left with the bulk of the Ifriqiyan army for Sicily. Upon hearing the news, Habib aborted the Sicilian campaign, and shipped his army quickly back to Africa to help quell the uprising.

While waiting for Habib to return, Obeid Allah assembled a cavalry-heavy column from the nobles of Kairouan, placing it under the command of Khalid ibn Abi Habib al-Fihri (possibly Habib's brother, see Fihrids). This vanguard column was to hold a line in the outskirts of Tangiers, and keep the rebels in check, until Habib arrived with his Sicilian expeditionary army. But the Berber rebels did not wait. Under their new leader, Khalid ibn Hamid al-Zanati, the Berbers attacked and annihilated the Arab column in what became known as the Battle of the Nobles in late October/November 740.

Habib ibn Abi Ubaida's army arrived too late to prevent the massacre of the nobles. Unable to take on the Berbers by himself, he withdrew his army to Tlemcen to pick up reserves, only to find that city in disarray. The Umayyad garrison commander, Ibn al-Mughira, had, in a state of panic, initiated a series of indiscriminate massacres in a pre-emptive effort to quell an uprising, and ended up provoking that uprising himself. Bewildered and angry, Habib let his fury fall on Musa ibn Abi Khalid, an Umayyad captain who had bravely stayed behind collecting loyal forces. Accusing him of causing the uprising, Habib ordered Musa's hand and leg chopped off.

Collecting what remained of the Umayyad army in Ifriqiya, Habib ibn Abi Ubaida entrenched himself in a defensive line in the vicinity of Tlemcen (or perhaps as far back as Tahert) and appealed to Kairouan for reinforcements. His request was forwarded to Damascus.

In spring 741, Umayyad Caliph Hisham ibn Abd al-Malik dispatched a new governor Kulthum ibn Iyad al-Qushayri at the head of a fresh Arab army, drawn from the Syrian junds. The Syrian cavalry, under Kulthum's nephew, Balj ibn Bishr al-Qushayri, was the first to arrive in Kairouan and they imposed themselves on the city, billeting troops, requisitioning supplies, and threatening its inhabitants. The people of Kairouan appealed to Habib ibn Abi Ubaida (then still encamped in the environs of Tlemcen, with some 40,000 Ifriqiyan troops) for assistance. Angered by the reports, Habib fired off a heated missive to Kulthum, threatening to turn his own army against the Syrians if he did not curb his nephew and put an end to the abuses in Kairouan.

The junction between the Syrian and Ifriqiyan armies near Tlemcen did not go any more smoothly. The Ifriqiyans were still smoldering about the Kairouan reports and offended by Syrian high-handedness, while the Syrians remained incensed at what they perceived to be ingratitude. Balj immediately brought up the issue of the threats Habib had made in his heated letter, and demanded that his uncle Kulthum ibn Iyad arrest the Ifriqiyan commander for treason. Habib in turn threatened to decamp unless Kulthum brought his nephew to order and treated the Ifriqiyans with more respect. The armies nearly came to blows. But by smooth diplomacy, Kulthum managed to patch over the quarrels and hold the armies together. But the mutual resentments would play a role in what followed.

The joint Syrian-Ifriqiyan army clashed with the Berber rebels at the Battle of Bagdoura, by the Sebou river (near modern Fez) in October 741. In setting up the battle, Kulthum disdained Habib ibn Abi Ubaida's experience and advice on how to fight the Berbers - 'foot for foot, horse for horse' – and instead sent the Arab cavalry forth against the Berber foot. Berber slingers and missile troops quickly dehorsed and separated them, depriving the Arabs of their best asset. The Berbers then fell upon the Arab infantry, overwhelming them with numbers and targeting their commanders. The Ifriqiyan column was the first to be hit, and Habib ibn Abi Ubaida among the first to be killed.

Once Habib was known to have fallen, the Ifriqiyan troops felt no compulsion to remain in the field with the hateful Syrians, and quickly broke ranks and fled, leaving the Syrians to fight alone. The defeat turned into a rout. Some two-thirds of the Arab forces, including the governor Kulthum, were either killed or captured by the Berbers.

The Ifriqiyan remnant fled in a scattered manner back to Kairouan, while the remainder of the Syrian army, held together by Balj ibn Bishr, scampered to Ceuta and secured passage over to al-Andalus. Habib's eldest son, Abd al-Rahman ibn Habib al-Fihri, survived the battle and accompanied the Syrians to Spain.

Habib was survived by several sons, notably Abd al-Rahman, Ilyas, Abd al-Wareth and Amran. In 745, they took over and ruled Ifriqiya as a Fihrid family dominion. One of Habib's son's, Ismail ibn Habib al-Fihri, would forgo the coast and family politics and head inland to organize campaigns against the desert-dwelling nomadic Berbers below the Sous valley, pushing into the region of what is now Western Sahara and Mauritania. It is reported by one of his commanders that, by the 730s, their expeditions had reached as far south as "the Nile" (the Senegal River).

== Sources ==
- Ibn Khaldun, Histoire des Berbères et des dynasties musulmanes de l'Afrique, 1852 trans., Algiers.
- Hrbek, Ivan (1992), Africa from the Seventh to the Eleventh Century, 3rd, University of California Press
- Julien, Charles-André, Histoire de l'Afrique du Nord, des origines à 1830, édition originale 1931, réédition Payot, Paris, 1961
- Abd al-Wahid Dhannun Taha, The Muslim conquest and settlement of North Africa and Spain, 1989, London, Routledge.
- Blankinship, Khalid Yahya (1994). The End of the Jihâd State: The Reign of Hishām ibn ʻAbd al-Malik and the Collapse of the Umayyads. Albany, New York: State University of New York Press. ISBN 978-0-7914-1827-7.

== See also ==
- History of early Islamic Tunisia
- History of medieval Tunisia
