= Tha'laba ibn Salama al-Amili =

Arab military commander and governor (died 750)

Tha'laba ibn Salama al-Amili ثعلبة بن سلامة العاملي

Governor of al-Andalus
- In office 742–743

Personal details
- Born: Syria
- Died: 750 Egypt

Military service
- Allegiance: Umayyad Caliphate
- Battles/wars: Berber Revolt: Battle of Bagdoura (741); Abbasid Revolution

Tha'laba ibn Salama al-Amili (Arabic: ثعلبة بن سلامة العاملي) was an Arab military commander in al-Urdunn, al-Maghreb and the Iberian Peninsula, and briefly ruler of al-Andalus from August 742 to May 743.

Thalaba ibn Salama belonged to Banu Amilah of the Yaman faction, like most Andalusian Arabs, rather than the usual 'Qaysid' stock of the Syrians.

Thalaba ibn Salama went to North Africa with the 'Syrian' expedition of 741, led by Kulthum ibn Iyad al-Qasi and his nephew Balj ibn Bishr al-Qushayri, to crush the Great Berber Revolt in the Maghreb. Thalaba was the commander of the Jordan jund and, by explicit credentials of Caliph Hisham, was designated as second successor, should tragedy befall Kulthum or his first successor, Balj.

The Syrian army was defeated and Kulthum killed by the Berber rebels at the Battle of Bagdoura in October 741. Balj ibn Bishr took what remained of the Syrian regiments (junds), some 10,000 men, to Ceuta. After protracted negotiations with the Andalusian governor Abd al-Malik ibn Qatn al-Fihri, Syrian forces were ferried over to al-Andalus in early 742.

After defeating the Berber rebel armies in al-Andalus in the Spring of 742, relations between the Andalusian governor and the Syrian commanders quickly broke down. The Syrian leader Balj ibn Bishr deposed and executed the old governor and declared himself the new ruler of al-Andalus.

But rallied by the sons of the late governor, the Andalusí Arabs (now calling themselves baladiyun or baladis) took up arms against the Syrian junds (which they called the shamiyun). Although the Syrians crushed the Andalusians at the Battle of Aqua Portora outside of Cordoba in August, 742, their commander Balj ibn Bishr died the next day from battlefield wounds. As his lieutenant and designated successor, Thalaba ibn Salama al-Amili was immediately acclaimed by the Syrian troops as their head, and consequently governor of al-Andalus.

Thalaba's authority did not extend much beyond Córdoba, where the Syrian regiments had hunkered down. Sometime in late 742 or early 743, Thalaba marched onto Mérida, an area of rebel activity, but soon found himself trapped with his small army in the citadel by the Andalusians. Calculating there was no escape, Andalusians carried the siege of Mérida in a leisurely fashion. The siege camp soon took on the character of a fair, attracting numerous onlookers and their families. But one early morning, when the besiegers were preparing for a much-anticipated festival, Thalaba launched an unexpected sally out of Mérida, and quickly overwhelmed the siege camp, taking as much as ten thousand prisoners, including many women and children. Thalaba marched his prisoners to Córdoba, where he is said to have sold many of the high-ranking Andalusian captives as discount-price slaves.

But by this time, peace parties in both camps had already made appeals to Handhala ibn Safwan al-Kalbi, the new governor in Ifriqiya, to settle the matter. In early 743, Handhala dispatched his deputy, Abu al-Khattar al-Husam ibn Darar al-Kalbi, to resolve the quarrel. Being of the same Arab tribal stock as the Andalusians but with a background in the noble circles of Damascus, Abu al-Khattar was expected to play an even-handed role in the Syrian–Andalusian dispute. Abu al-Khattar arrived in Córdoba in March 743, not long after the battle of Mérida, and took possession of the government with little opposition.

According to chronicler Ibn Abd al-Hakam, Tha'laba ibn Salama sailed to Ifriqiya shortly after and served briefly there under Handhala ibn Safwan al-Kalbi in various military commands. Thalaba returned to the east, possibly with Handhala, around the time of the 745 coup of Abd al-Rahman ibn Habib al-Fihri.

Thalaba ibn Salama al-Amili is reported to have subsequently served as Umayyad governor of al-Urdan (Jordan) in the late 740s. In 750, Thalaba accompanied the Umayyad Caliph Marwan II in his flight to Egypt to escape the Abbasids.

Preceded by Balj ibn Bishr al-Qushayri	Governor of al-Andalus; 742–743	Succeeded by Abu al-Khattar al-Husam ibn Darar al-Kalbi
