= Balj ibn Bishr al-Qushayri =

Umayyad al-Andalus military commander (died 742)

Balj ibn Bishr al-Qushayri بلج بن بشر القشيري

Governor of Ifriqiya
- In office 741–742
- Monarch: Hisham ibn Abd al-Malik
- Preceded by: Kulthum ibn Iyadh al-Kushayri
- Succeeded by: Hanzala ibn Safwan al-Kalbi

Governor of al-Andalus
- In office 742–742
- Monarch: Hisham ibn Abd al-Malik
- Preceded by: Abd al-Malik ibn Qatn al-Fihri
- Succeeded by: Tha'laba ibn Salama al-Amili

Personal details
- Died: August 742 Cordoba

Military service
- Allegiance: Umayyad Caliphate
- Battles/wars: Berber Revolt: Battle of Bagdoura (741)

Balj ibn Bishr al-Qushayri (Arabic: بلج بن بشر القشيري) was an Umayyad military commander in the Maghreb (North Africa) and al-Andalus (Iberia), and briefly became the ruler of al-Andalus in 742 until his death in August of the same year. Balj was a member of the Banu Qushayr, a branch of the Hawazin tribe, and was the nephew of Kulthum ibn Iyad al-Qasi, who had been appointed governor of Ifriqiya by the Umayyad caliph Hisham. In 741 Balj was cavalry lieutenant under his uncle's command on a military campaign against a Berber Revolt in North Africa. Kulthum headed an army of 30,000 Arab troops from regiments (junds) from Damascus, Jordan, Qinnasrin, Homs, Palestine and Egypt.

Balj ibn Bishr led the vanguard of his army which arrived in Kairouan in the summer of 741. Problems began when billeting Umayyad troops and requisitioning supplies from their Arabian-Ifriqiyan hosts, under their commander Habib ibn Abi Obeida al-Fihri. Ancient pre-Islamic tribal rivalries persisted between the largely Kalbid - Qahtanite (Yemenite) Ifriqiyan and Andalusian Arabs, and the north Arabian Qaysid - Mudharite' (Hijazi-Nejdi) tribes that comprised the Arabian-Syrian junds. Balj ibn Bishr's own tribal origins were Qaysid, and when the Arabian-Syrian expedition joined the remnant of the Arabian-Ifriqiyan army near Tlemcen, he antagonized tensions between the two armies which were only defused at the arrival of his uncle. The hostilities between sections of the army, probably contributed to the subsequent defeat by the Berber rebels at the Battle of Bagdoura (near modern Fes). Kulthum ibn Iyad was killed, and 20,000 of his Syrian troops were killed or captured. Balj fled north towards the coast, with the remaining 10,000 troops, pursued by the Berbers. Reaching Ceuta, they barricaded their position and Balj ibn Bishr sought secure sea passage for his army to al-Andalus. The Andalusian governor Abd al-Malik ibn Qatn al-Fihri, aware of the threat the Syrians posed to his own domestic powers, refused the request of the besieged Syrians at Ceuta and prohibited the sending of supplies. Reportedly one Arab merchant who was caught having surreptitiously sent two grain boats to the starving Syrians was publicly tortured and executed on the governor's command.

Eventually the threat of a Berber uprising in his own hinterlands, caused the governor to relent and grant the Syrians crossing on the basis that Balj ibn Bishr sign a treaty with strict conditions– the Syrians would assist the Andalusian Arabs put down the Berber rebellion and then return to North Africa within a year of the Berber matter being settled. Hostages were given to ensure Balj's compliance.

Crossing the straits of Gibraltar in early 742, the Syrians assisted in the swift defeat of the three main Berber rebel armies through a series of encounters – at Medina-Sidonia, Córdoba and finally Toledo.

With the Berber armies defeated Ibn Qatan immediately pressed Balj ibn Bishr for the departure of the Syrians. At this Balj ibn Bishr invoked his caliphal credentials as designated successor to his uncle, the late Kulthum ibn Iyad, and his legal claim to depose Ibn Qatn and declare himself governor of Ifriqiya and ruler of al-Andalus. Avenging the punishment of the good Andalusian who had relieved them at Ceuta, Balj had the elderly Ibn Qatan publicly tortured to death.

In reaction the sons of the late Fihrid governor, Qattan and Umayya, rallied the Andalusian Arabians, who rose up against Balj ibn Bishr and the Shami (Syrian) Arabian junds but they were decisively defeated at the Battle of Aqua Portora, outside Córdoba on 6 August, 742, by the junds. Balj ibn Bishr however was wounded in the battle and died two days later. His successor was lieutenant Thalaba ibn Salama al-Amili.

In the account by the chronicler Ibn al-Khatam, Balj ibn Bishr was killed in battle by Abd al-Rahman ibn Habib al-Fihri, the future ruler of Ifriqiya, who had accompanied the Syrians to al-Andalus, but defected to the Andalusians upon the execution of the Fihrid governor. It seems likely that Khatam has confused this Abd al-Rahman with Abd al-Rahman ibn Alqama al-Lakhmi, the Andalusian governor of Narbonne, who, as his army was falling apart, is reported elsewhere to have sought out Balj in the heat of battle amongst the Syrian cavalry and struck him with his spear.

== Sources ==
- Al-Maqqari, trans. 1840-43, The History of the Mohammedan dynasties in Spain, v.2, London: Royal Asiatic Society.
- Kennedy, Hugh (1996) Muslim Spain and Portugal: A Political History of al-Andalus, New York and London: Longman.
- Lévi-Provençal, E. (1950) Histoire de l'Espagne musulmane, Tome 1, 1999 ed., Paris: Larose.
- Mercier, E. (1888) Histoire de l'Afrique septentrionale, v. 1, Paris: Leroux. Repr. Elibron Classics, 2005.
- Taha, Abd al-Wahid Dhannun (1989) The Muslim conquest and settlement of North Africa and Spain, London, Routledge.

Preceded by Kulthum ibn Iyadh al-Kushayri	Governor of Ifriqiya; 741–742	Succeeded by Handhala ibn Safwan al-Kalbi
Preceded by Abd al-Malik ibn Katan al-Fihri	Governor of Al-Andalus; 742	Succeeded by Thalaba ibn Salama al-Amili
