= Tangier expedition (740) =

Campaign by Berbers against the Arabs

- Part of Berber Revolt
Date	740
Location	Sūs al-Adnā, Tangier
Result	Berber Victory

Belligerents
Berber insurgents	Umayyad Caliphate

Commanders and leaders
Maysar al-Matghari; Hamid al-Zanati	Umar al-Muradi †; Ismail ibn Ubayd Allah †

Strength
Unknown	Unknown

Casualties and losses
Unknown	High; Many soldiers and civilians captured & killed.

The Tangier expedition was a campaign led by Maysara al-Matghari, in which he rebelled against Umayyad rule and headed with his Berbers followers to Tangier, where he defeated the Umayyad governor of the city and entered the city of Tangier, which became a base for the revolution against the Umayyads.

== Background ==
The Berber revolt in North Africa were provoked by the policy of Ubayd Allah ibn al-Habhab, who imposed excessive rates of taxation and was arbitrary in his treatment of the Berbers. Acting likewise were a number of his subordinates, especially the one in charge at Tangier, the delegation of Berbers, headed by Maysara al-Matghari "the leader of the later revolt of (740)", went to Damascus during the caliphate of Hisham ibn Abd al-Malik with a number of grievances against injustices committed by his representatives, When they found no one who would pay heed to them, they returned to their country and the rebellion exploded under the leadership of Maysara.

== Expedition ==
=== Capture of Tangier ===
The revolt broke out on 15 August 740 in several places at once, as prearranged. Its quick success shows that it was carefully planned and that its secret had been well kept. The rebels rendered the oath of allegiance to Maysara al-Matghari as their caliph. Maysara led the rebel forces against Umar al-Muradi the governor of Tangier, who came out of the city to fight and was immediately killed with most of his troops the Berbers then occupied Tangier, which it will be remembered was the chief military base for the western half of North Africa. They are reported He did not only kill the greedy Arab ruler Umar al-Muradi, but also killed healthy and disabled Arabs, and even included young and old children, and young and old Arab women who were taken captive, thus applying the doctrines of the Kharijites.

=== Battle of Sous al-Adna ===
Maysara confirmed Abd al-A'la ibn Larij al-Afriqi as the governor of Tangier, while he himself marched to "Sūs al-Adnā" which was governed by ismail ibn Ubayd Allah. Isma'il sent an army against him, but Maysara defeated it and then attacked the Umayyad forces' camp at night slaying Isma'il. At this point the rebels had control of all of modern Morocco, those initial victories encouraged the flames of revolution against the Arabs throughout the Maghreb, all the Berbers revolted against the Umayyad governors in their cities, either killing or expelling them.

== Aftermath ==
At this point, the rebels became discontented with Maysara and slew him. In his stead, they set up as caliph Khalid ibn Hamid al-Zanati who led the tribes of Northern Morocco towards the Chelif River, routing the Arab armies on his way East in Battle of the Nobles which was a humiliating slaughter of the flower of the Arab aristocracy.

== See also ==
- Berbers and Islam
- Muslim conquest of the Maghreb
- Berber Revolt
- Battle of Bagdoura
- Battle of the Nobles

== Sources ==
- Dūrī, ʿAbd-al-ʿAzīz ad-; Dūrī, ʿAbd-al-ʿAzīz ad- (2012). The historical formation of the Arab nation: a study in identity and consciousness. Routledge Library Editions: The Arab nation. London: Routledge. ISBN 978-0-415-62286-8.
- Blankinship, Khalid Yahya (1994). The end of the jihâd state: the reign of Hishām ibn ʻAbd al-Malik and the collapse of the Umayyads. SUNY series in medieval Middle East history. Albany: State University of New York Press. ISBN 978-0-7914-1827-7.
- Fāsī, Muḥammad al-; Hrbek, Ivan, eds. (2000). General history of Africa: 3 ; Africa from the seventh to the eleventh century (Reprinted in 2000 by UNESCO Publishing ed.). Oxford: Heinemann Publishers. ISBN 978-92-3-101709-4.
- García-Arenal, Mercedes, ed. (2010). Messianism and puritanical reform: Mahdīs of the Muslim west. The medieval and early modern Iberian world 1569-1934. Leiden Boston: Brill. ISBN 978-90-474-0922-9.
- Mouliéras, Auguste (1899). Le Maroc imconnu ...: ptie. Exploration des Djebala (in French). L'auteur [Impr. Fouque & cie].
- كتاب: تاريخ المغرب العربي - الجزء الأول (in Arabic). Ḥamīd, Saʻd Zaghlūl. 1993.
