= Kulthum ibn Iyad al-Qushayri =

Kulthum ibn lyadh al-Kushayri كلثوم بن عياض القشيري

Governor of Ifriqiya
- In office February 741 – October 741
- Monarch: Hisham ibn Abd al-Malik
- Preceded by: Ubayd Allah ibn al-Habhab
- Succeeded by: Balj ibn Bishr al-Qushayri

Personal details
- Died: October 741 Sebou River, near Fes

Military service
- Allegiance: Umayyad Caliphate
- Battles/wars: Berber Revolt: Battle of Bagdoura (741) †

Kulthum ibn Iyad al-Qushayri (Arabic: كلثوم بن عياض القشيري) was an Umayyad governor of Ifriqiya for a few months, from February to his death in October 741.

== Life ==
Kulthum ibn Iyad, an Arab aristocrat of the Qaysi tribe of Qushayr (branch of the Banu Amir), was appointed by the Umayyad caliph Hisham in February 741 as governor of Kairouan (Ifriqiya, i.e. central North Africa), with authority over all the Maghreb (western North Africa) and al-Andalus (the Iberian Peninsula). He replaced the disgraced Ubayd Allah ibn al-Habhab, whose misgovernment had provoked the Great Berber Revolt in the area of modern Morocco and led to the defeat of the Arab army at the Battle of the Nobles in late 740.

Kulthum was given an Arab army of 30,000, raised from the regiments (junds) of the east, specifically, Damascus, Jordan, Qinnasrin, Hims, Palestine and Egypt. The military command of this elite Syrian army was given to Kulthum's nephew and designated successor, Balj ibn Bishr al-Qushayri, and the vice-command to the designated second successor, Tha'laba ibn Salama al-Amili.

Kulthum arrived in the environs of Kairouan in the summer of 741. He did not enter the city, but dispatched a messenger assigning the government of the city to Abd al-Rahman ibn Uqba al-Ghifari, the qadi of Ifriqiya. Kulthum then hurried along the coast to make junction with the remaining Ifriqiyan forces of Habib ibn Abi Ubayda, then holding ground against the Berber rebellion around Tlemcen. The junction between the Ifriqiyan and Syrian forces did not go smoothly. The Syrian commanders, particularly Balj ibn Bishr, treated their Ifriqiyan counterparts in a high-minded and disdainful fashion, and the armies nearly came to blows. Kulthum papered over the differences and kept the armies together.

The armies moved down the Sebou river into the area central modern Morocco, where they finally encountered the Berber rebel army of Khalid ibn Hamid al-Zanati. Disdaining the advice of the experienced Ifriqiyans, Kulthum made several tactical errors which led to the disastrous defeat of the Arab army at the Battle of Bagdoura in October 741. Kulthum was killed in the field. His nephew Balj rescued the remnants of the Syrian army and ferried them over to al-Andalus in early 742.

== See also ==
- Great Berber Revolt
- History of early Islamic Tunisia
- History of medieval Tunisia

Preceded by Ubayd Allah ibn al-Habhab	Governor of Ifriqiya; 741	Succeeded by Balj ibn Bishr al-Qushayri
