= Berber Revolt =

740–743 Berber secession from the Umayyad Caliphate

- Part of the Fitnas
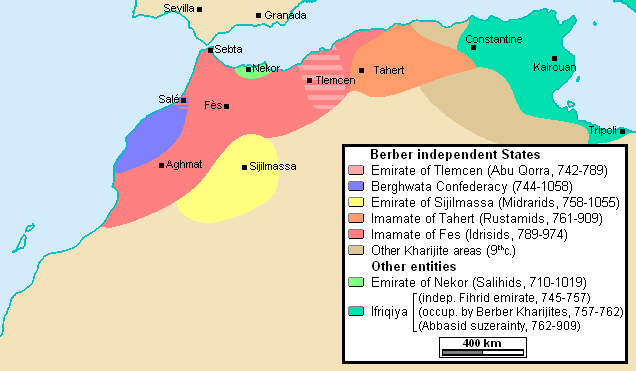
- Map of Northwest Africa following the Berber Revolt.
Date	740–743
Location	Maghreb and al-Andalus
Result	Berber victory
Territorial changes	Establishment of several independent Berber states

Belligerents
Umayyad Caliphate	Berber rebels

Commanders and leaders
Hisham ibn Abd al-Malik # Ubayd Allah ibn al-Habhab; Khalid ibn Abi Habib †; Kulthum ibn Iyad †; Abd al-Rahman ibn Habib; Handhala ibn Safwan; Balj ibn Bishr †; Abd al-Malik ibn Qatan (executed); Habib ibn Abi Ubayda †; Tha'laba ibn Salama	Khalid ibn Hamid; Maysara al-Matghari (executed); Salim Abu Yusuf al-Azdi; Ukkasha ibn Ayyub (executed); Abd al-Wahid ibn Yazid †

The Berber Revolt or the Kharijite Revolt of 740–743 AD (122–125 AH in the Islamic calendar) took place during the reign of the Umayyad caliph Hisham ibn Abd al-Malik and marked the first successful secession from the Arab Caliphate (then ruled from Damascus). Inspired by Kharijite puritan preachers, the Berber revolt against their Umayyad Arab rulers began in Tangier in 740 and was led initially by Maysara al-Matghari. The revolt soon spread throughout the rest of the Maghreb and across the Strait of Gibraltar to Al-Andalus.

Although the Berbers managed to end Umayyad rule in the western Maghreb following the Battle of Badgoura and Battle of the Nobles, the Umayyads scrambled and managed to prevent the core of Ifriqiya (Tunisia, eastern Algeria, and western Libya) and al-Andalus (Spain and Portugal) from falling into rebel hands, notably securing victory in the decisive Battle of al-Asnam. However, the rest of the Maghreb was never brought back to the Umayyads as their control in North Africa collapse. After the revolt, several independent Berber states were established.

The Berber revolt was probably the largest military setback in the reign of Caliph Hisham. From this revolt emerged the first Berber and non-Arab Caliphate.

== Background ==
The underlying causes of the revolt were the policies of the Umayyad governors in Kairouan, Ifriqiya, who had authority over the Maghreb (all of North Africa west of Egypt) and Al-Andalus.

Since the Muslim conquest of North Africa, Arab commanders had treated non-Arab (notably Berber) auxiliaries inconsistently, and often rather shabbily. When they arrived in North Africa, the Umayyads faced a Christian-majority population in Africa Proconsularis (which became Ifriqiya, modern-day Tunisia), and Christians, pagans, and Jewish minorities in the Maghreb al-Aqsa (modern-day Morocco). Some Berbers of the Maghreb quickly converted and participated in the region's growth of Islam, but Arab authorities continued to treat them as second-class people.

== Causes of the Revolt ==
There are several causes for the Berber Revolt. One of the these causes was the due to Ubayd Allah b. al-Habhàb, who was the Umayyad governor of North Africa. Despite the Berber's having converted to Islam, the Umayyads enslaved a fifth of some of the Muslims Berbers on the reason that they were originally meant to be enslaved and that the caliph had never gotten his share of slaves. Furthermore the Umayyads continued to enslave the berbers and sent a constant supply of slaves, particularly girls, was sent to the Umayyad Caliph in Damascus. According to Al-Tabari the most beautiful Berber girls were taken arbitrarily to be slaves even though they were Muslims. It is not known how widespread this was or whether it was centrally authorized. Either way this caused a great amount of hatred for the Berbers against the Umayyads.

Although Berbers had undertaken much of the fighting in the Umayyad conquest of Hispania, they were given a lesser share of the spoils and frequently assigned to the harsher duties (e.g. Berbers were thrown into the vanguard while Arab forces were kept in the back; they were assigned garrison duty on the more troubled frontiers). Although the Ifriqiyan Arab governor Musa ibn Nusayr had cultivated his Berber lieutenants (most famously, Tariq ibn Ziyad), his successors, notably Yazid ibn Abi Muslim, had treated their Berber forces particularly poorly.

As a result, resentful Berbers grew receptive to radical Kharijite activists from the east (notably of Sufrite and later Ibadite persuasion) which had begun arriving in the Maghreb in the 720s. The Kharijites preached a puritan form of Islam, promising a new political order, where all Muslims would be equal, irrespective of ethnicity or tribal status, and Islamic law would be strictly adhered to. The appeal of the Kharijite message to Berber ears allowed their activists to gradually penetrate Berber regiments and population centers. Revolts by Berbers (e.g. under Munuza in Cerdanya, Spain, in 729–731) were put down with difficulty. One Ifriqiyan governor, Yazid ibn Abi Muslim, who openly resumed the jizya and humiliated his Berber guard by branding their hands, however he was assassinated in 721.

All of the oppression by the Umayyads against the Berbers caused them to send Maysara Matghari, who would go onto become the first Caliph of the Berber Caliphate and leader of the Berber Revolt, along with a delegation to the Caliph Hisham in Damascus. This action tends to confirm that Maysara al-Madghari was a member of the caliphal army in North Africa. As he was the initiator of the revolt, the planning for it then started in the Berber units of the caliphal army. Due to the Umayyad need for soldiers, the caliphate had created a monster for itself by arming and training a large number of Berbers, while at the same time oppressing the Berbers. At the end of it the Berber delegation was not even received by the caliph which eventually set the seeds of the rebellion.

== Revolt ==
=== Revolt in the Maghreb ===
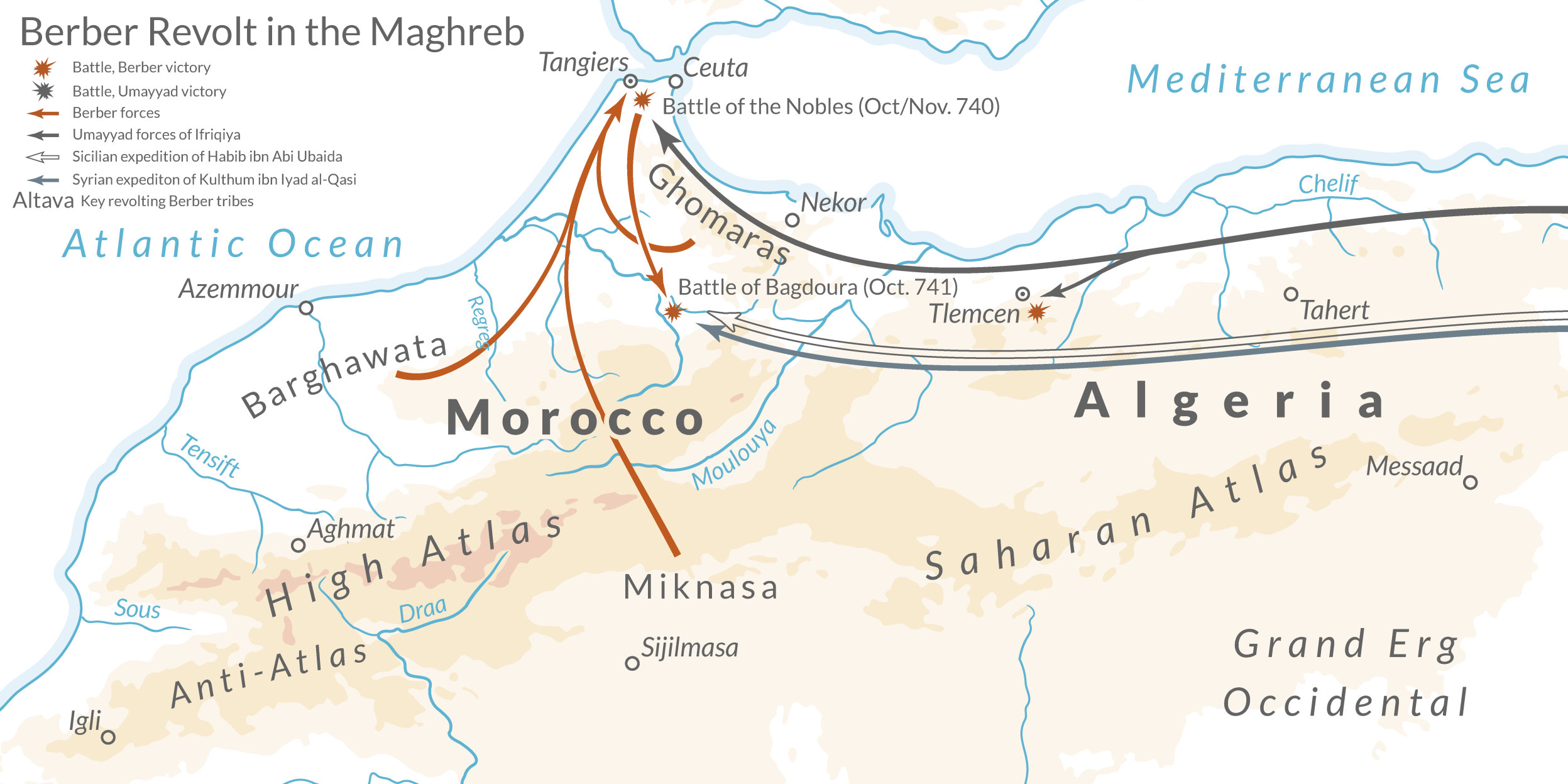
Initial stages of the Berber revolt

The zeal of the Umayyad tax-collectors finally broke Berber patience. It is reported that following Ubayd Allah ibn al-Habhab's instructions to extract more revenues from the Berbers, Omar ibn al-Moradi, his deputy governor in Tangiers, decided to declare the Berbers in his jurisdiction a "conquered people" and consequently set about seizing Berber property and enslaving persons, as per the rules of conquest, the "caliphal fifth" was still owed to the Umayyad state (alternative accounts report he simply doubled their tribute).

This was the last straw. Inspired by the Sufrite preachers, the North African Berber tribes of western Morocco – initially, the Ghomara, Berghwata and Miknasa – decided to break openly into revolt against their Arab overlords. As their leader, they chose Maysara al-Matghari, alleged by some Arab chroniclers to be a lowly water-carrier (but more probably a high Berber chieftain from the Matghara tribe).

The only question was timing. The opportunity arose sometime in early 740 (122 AH), when the powerful Ifriqiyan general Habib ibn Abi Ubayda al-Fihri, who had recently been imposing his authority on the Sous valley of southern Morocco, received instructions from the Kairouan governor Ubayd Allah to lead a large expedition across the sea against Byzantine Sicily. Gathering his forces, Habib ibn Abi Obeida marched the bulk of the Ifriqiyan army out of Morocco.

As soon as the mighty Habib was safely gone, Maysara assembled his coalition of Berber armies, heads shaven in the Sufri Kharijite fashion and with Qura'nic inscriptures tied to their lances and spears, and brought them bearing down on Tangier. The city soon fell into rebel hands and the hated governor Omar al-Moradi was killed. It was at this point that Maysara is said to have taken up the title and pretences of amir al-mu'minin ("Commander of the Faithful", or "Caliph"). Leaving a Berber garrison in Tangier under the command of Christian convert, Abd al-Allah al-Hodeij al-Ifriqi, Maysara's army proceeded to sweep down western Morocco, swelling its ranks with new adherents, overwhelming Umayyad garrisons clear from the Strait of Gibraltar down to the Sous. One of the local governors killed by the Berbers was Ismail ibn Ubayd Allah, the very son of the Kairouan emir.

The Berber revolt surprised the Umayyad governor in Kairouan, Ubayd Allah ibn al-Habhab, who had very few troops at his disposal. He immediately dispatched messengers to his general Habib ibn Abi Obeida al-Fihri in Sicily instructing him to break off the expedition and urgently ship the Ifriqiyan army back to Africa. In the meantime, Ubayd Allah assembled a cavalry-heavy column, composed of the aristocratic Arab elite of Kairouan. He placed the nobles under the command of Khalid ibn Abi Habib al-Fihri, and dispatched it to Tangiers, to keep the Berber rebels contained, while awaiting Habib's return from Sicily. A smaller reserve army was placed under Abd al-Rahman ibn al-Mughira al-Abdari and instructed to hold Tlemcen, in case the Berber rebel army should break through the column and try to drive towards Kairouan.

Maysara's Berber forces encountered the vanguard Ifriqiyan column of Khalid ibn Abi Habib somewhere in the outskirts of Tangiers After a brief skirmish with the Arab column, Maysara abruptly ordered the Berber armies to fall back to Tangier. The Arab cavalry commander Khalid ibn Abi Habiba did not give pursuit, but just held his line south of Tangier, blockading the Berber-held city, while awaiting the reinforcements from Habib's Sicilian expedition.

In this breathing space, the Berber rebels got reorganized and undertook an internal coup. The Berber tribal leaders swiftly deposed (and executed) Maysara and elected the Zenata Berber chieftain, Khalid ibn Hamid al-Zanati as the new Berber "caliph". The reasons for Maysara's fall remain obscure. Possibly the sudden cowardice shown before the Arab cavalry column proved him military unfit, possibly because the puritan Sufrite preachers found a flaw in the piety of his character, or maybe simply because the Zenata tribal chieftains, being closer to the Ifriqiyan frontline, felt they should be the ones leading the rebellion.

The new Berber leader Khalid ibn Hamid al-Zanati opted to immediately attack the idling Ifriqiyan column before they could be reinforced. The Berber rebels under Khalid ibn Hamid overwhelmed and annihilated the Arab cavalry of Khalid ibn Abi Habiba in an encounter known as the Battle of the Nobles, on account of the veritable massacre of the cream of the Ifriqiyan Arab nobility. This is tentatively dated around c. October–November, 740.

The immediate Arab reaction to the disaster shows just how unexpected this reversal was. Upon the first news of the defeat of the nobles, the reserve army of Ibn al-Mughira in Tlemcen fell into a panic. Seeing Sufrite preachers everywhere in the city, the Umayyad commander ordered his nervous Arab troops to conduct a series of round-ups in Tlemcen, several of which ended in indiscriminate massacres. This provoked a massive popular uprising in the hitherto-quiet city. The city's largely Berber population quickly drove out the Umayyad troops. The frontline of the Berber revolt now leaped to the middle Maghreb (Algeria).

The Sicilian expeditionary army of Habib ibn Abi Obeida arrived too late to prevent the massacre of the nobles. Realizing they were in no position to take on the Berber army by themselves, they retreated to Tlemcen, to gather the reserves, only to find that city too was now in disarray. There, Habib encountered Musa ibn Abi Khalid, an Umayyad captain who had bravely stayed behind in the vicinity of Tlemcen gathering what loyal forces he could find. The state of panic and confusion was such that Habib ibn Abi Obeida decided to blame the guiltless captain for the entire mess and cut off one of his hands and one of his legs in punishment.

Habib ibn Abi Obeida entrenched what remained of the Ifriqiyan army in the vicinity of Tlemcen (perhaps as far back as Tahert), and called upon Kairouan for reinforcements. The request was forwarded to Damascus.

Caliph Hisham, hearing the shocking news, is said to have exclaimed: "By God, I will most certainly rage against them with an Arab rage, and I will send against them an army whose beginning is where they are and whose end is where I am!"

=== Coup in al-Andalus ===
It is sometimes reported that the Andalusian governor Uqba ibn al-Hajjaj dispatched an Andalusian army across the straits to support the Ifriqiyan column around Tangiers, only to be similarly defeated by the Berber rebels in late 740. But this story has been discounted by modern historians, as it is sourced principally from later al-Andalus chronicles; there is nothing in contemporary accounts referencing any such expedition.

Nonetheless, the news of the Berber victory in Morocco echoed through al-Andalus. Berbers heavily outnumbered Arabs in al-Andalus. Fearing the Berber garrisons in their own lands might take inspiration from their Moroccan brethren, the Andalusian Arab elite quickly deposed Obeid Allah's deputy, Uqba ibn al-Hajjaj, in January 741 and reinstated his predecessor, Abd al-Malik ibn Qatn al-Fihri, a more popular figure among local Arabs and Berbers alike.

=== Syrian expedition ===
In February, 741, the Umayyad caliph Hisham appointed Kulthum ibn Iyad al-Qushayri to replace the disgraced Obeid Allah as governor in Ifriqiya. Kulthum was to be accompanied by a fresh Arab army of 30,000 – 27,000 raised from the regiments (junds) of Syria and an additional 3,000 to be picked up in Egypt. Caliph Hisham appointed Kulthum's nephew Balj ibn Bishr al-Qushayri as his lieutenant and designated successor, and the Jordanian commander Tha'laba ibn Salama al-Amili as his second successor (should tragedy befall the prior two).

The elite Syrian cavalry under Balj ibn Bishr, which had moved ahead of the bulk of the forces, was the first to arrive in Kairouan in the Summer of 741. Their brief stay was not a happy one. The Syrians arrived in haughty spirits and quarreled with the Kairouan city authorities, who suspicious, had given them a rather cool reception. Interpreting it as ingratitude, the Syrian barons imposed themselves on the city, billeting troops and requisitioning supplies without regard to local authorities or priorities.

(It is pertinent to note that the members of the Syrian expedition were of different tribal stock than the Arabs they came to save. The early Arab colonists of Ifriqiya and al-Andalus had been drawn largely from tribes of south Arabian origin (known as Kalbi or Yamani tribes), whereas the Syrian junds were mostly of north Arabian tribes (Qaysi or Mudari tribes). The ancient and deep pre-Islamic tribal rivalry between the Qaysi and Yamani Arabs found itself invoked in repeated quarrels between the earlier colonists and the arriving junds.)

Moving slower with the bulk of the forces, Kulthum ibn Iyad himself did not enter Kairouan, but merely dispatched a message assigning the government of the city to Abd al-Rahman ibn Oqba al-Ghaffari, the qadi of Ifriqiya. Collecting the Syrian vanguard, Kulthum hurried along to make junction with the remaining Ifriqiyan forces (some 40,000) of Habib ibn Abi Obeida al-Fihri holding ground in the vicinity of Tlemcen.

The junction between the North African and Eastern forces did not go smoothly. News of the Syrian misbehavior in Kairouan had reached the Ifriqiyan troops, while the Syrians, incensed at the poor reception, treated their Ifriqiyan counterparts in a high-handed fashion. Habib and Balj bickered and the armies nearly came to blows. By smooth diplomacy, Kulthum ibn Iyad managed hold the armies together, but the mutual resentments would play a role in subsequent events.

The Berber rebel army formed after the joining of two armies, one led by Khalid ibn Hamid al-Zanati and one led by a certain Salim Abu Yusuf al-Azdi.

The Berber and Arab armies finally clashed at the Battle of Bagdoura (or Baqdura) in October–November, 741, by the Sebou river (near modern Fez). Disdaining the experience and cautious advice of the Ifriqiyans, Kulthum ibn Iyad made several serious tactical errors. Berber skirmishers dehorsed and isolated the Syrian cavalry, while the Berber foot fell upon the Arab infantry with overwhelming numbers. The Arab armies were quickly routed. By some estimates, two-thirds of the Arab army were killed or captured by the Berbers at Bagdoura. Among the casualties were the new governor Kulthum ibn Iyad al-Qushayri and the Ifriqiyan commander Habib ibn Abi Obeida al-Fihri.

=== Siege of Ceuta ===
After the disastrous defeat in the Battle of Bagdoura, the remains of Syrian regiments of the Umayyad army, now reduced to some 10,000, were pulled together by Kulthum's nephew, Balj ibn Bishr and scrambled up towards the Strait of Gibraltar, where they hoped to get passage across the sea to al-Andalus. A small Ifriqiyan contingent, under Habib's son Abd al-Rahman ibn Habib al-Fihri, joined the Syrians in their flight, but the rest of the Ifriqiyan forces fled in a scattered way back to Kairouan. A portion of the Berber army led by Ibn Humayd and Abū Yüsuf, were sent off in pursuit of the fleeing Syrians. But the commander of Balj's rear, Hassan b. Ghunáàba or Atafa, turned on the pursuers, defeated them, and killed Abu Yusuf. Balj tried first to enter Tangier, but found out that it was controlled by the Berbers.

As the Berber army were chasing the Syrians, Balji led his forces into Ceuta. Inside Ceuta, the Syrians were trapped. Even though they were safe from direct Berber assault because of Ceuta defensive position, they had no way of escaping. However, they are reported to have defeated repeated Berber attempts to take Ceuta. Then the Berbers resorted to a scorched-earth policy, burning and destroying the land around Ceuta so that the Syrians would find no supplies even by foraging. Soon, the Syrians had to eat their horses to stay alive, beginning an eleven month siege on Ceuta.

Balji begged the governor of Spain, Abd al-Malik ibn Qatan, to allow him and his men to come to Spain. But Abd al-Malik was naturally reluctant to let a foreign armed force into his Iberia. He was also backed up by Abd al-Rahman ibn Habib, who had also escaped the disaster at the Battle of Bagdoura separately from the others and managed to cross over to Spain. Abd al-Rahman ibn Habib strongly warned Abd al-Malik against allowing Balj and the besieged Syrian soldiers to cross into Spain. And in fact Abd al-Malik refused to even send the besieged Syrian soldiers supplies in Ceuta. The Syrian soldiers might have completely died off if a certain Arab in Spain had not sent them what he could in private. Even then, the Syrian soldiers were finally reduced to eating grass and herbs.

However, due to Berbers revolts in Iberia, encouraged by the success of Berbers in North Africa and in alliance with them. Berbers fought and drove the Arabs from Galicia, including Astorga, Marida, and Talavera near Toledo. After this campaign, Berbers seem to have held most of western Spain. This caused the Arab armies in Spain, from fear of being slaughtered by the Berbers, to withdraw toward their main bases in the center and south. They abandoned all the frontiers except that of Saraqusta in the northeast, where the Arabs had a majority. Abd al-Malik ibn Qatan sent out armies to the rebelling frontier zones, but they were soundly defeated.

This turn of events made Abd al-Malik ibn Qatan fear that the Arabs in Spain might soon meet the same fate as those in North Africa. This forced him to reconsider his Balji's pleas. Abd al-Malik ibn Qatan sent the latter supplies at long last and speedily negotiated a treaty with him. The treaty stated that the Syrians be brought over and maintained for one year, during which they were to fight for Abd al-Malik. At the end of this one year, they would leave Spain. Abd al-Malik would provide ships to transport them as a group to Tunisia where they would be far from the center of the Berber revolt which was now in the most western areas of North Africa.

After this one year period was done, the Syrians asked Abd al-Malik to transport them to Tunisia, however he said that he lacked the ships to transport them altogether, but he could send them in waves. The Syrians rejected this, most likely out of fear that the Syrians left behind could easily be robbed or killed by the Arabs in Spain. Then Abd al-Malik offered to transport them back to Ceuta, but they said they would rather be thrown into the sea than have to face the Berbers again.

=== Offensive on Kairouan ===
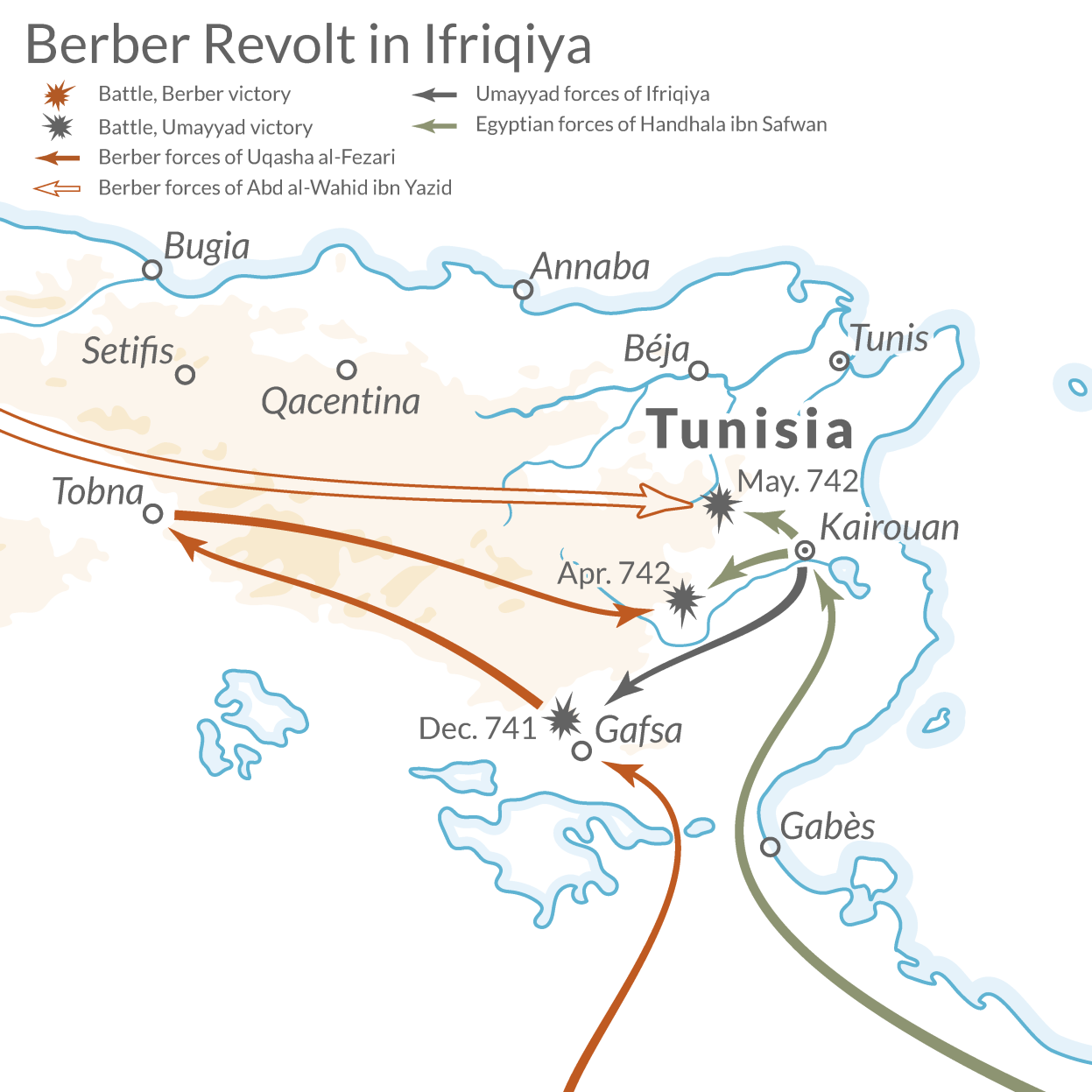
Final stages of the Berber revolt

The Zenata Berber leader Khalid ibn Hamid al-Zanati who delivered the two great victories over the Arab armies disappears from the chronicles shortly after Bagdoura (741). But news of the defeat emboldened hitherto quiet Berber tribes to join the revolt. Berber uprisings erupted across the Maghreb and al-Andalus.

The most immediate threat arose in southern Ifriqiya, where the Sufrite leader Uqasha ibn Ayub al-Fezari raised a Berber army and laid sieges to Gabès and Gafsa. By a rapid sally south with the remnant of the Ifriqiyan army, the Kairouan qadi Abd al-Rahman ibn Oqba al-Ghaffari managed to defeat and disperse Uqasha's forces near Gafsa in December, 741. But the qadi possessed far too few Arab troops to put up a pursuit, and Uqasha immediately set about re-assembling his forces quietly around Tobna in the Zab valley of western Ifriqiya.

Immediately after hearing of the disaster at Bagdoura, Caliph Hisham ordered the Umayyad governor of Egypt, Hanzala ibn Safwan al-Kalbi, to quickly take charge of Ifriqiya. In February 742, Hanzala ibn Safwan hurried his Egyptian army westwards and reached Kairouan around April 742, just as Uqasha was returning to try his luck again. Hanzala's forces pushed Uqasha back again.

When Uqasha was reassembling his forces once more in the Zab, he came across a large Berber army coming from the west, under the command of the Hawwara Berber chieftain Abd al-Wahid ibn Yazid al-Hawwari (possibly dispatched by the Berber caliph Khalid ibn Hamid al-Zanati, although he is not mentioned in the chronicles). Abd al-Wahid's army was composed of some 300,000 Berber troops, ostensibly the largest Berber army ever seen. After a quick consultation, Uqasha and Abd al-Wahid agreed on a joint attack on Kairouan, Uqasha taking his forces along a southerly route, while Abd al-Wahid led his large army through the northern passes, converging on Kairouan from both sides.

Hearing of the approach of the great Berber armies, Handhala ibn Safwan ordered Abd al-Rahman al-Ghifari to stop Abd al Wahid's advance. The two armies met at the Battle of Tubna in eastern Algeria on 21 September 742. Abd al-Rahman was defeated and killed along with several other prominent commanders, while his surviving troops fled to Handhala in Kairouan. After this, Abd al-Wahid stopped to take Tubna and possibly other places.

Hearing of the defeat. Hanzala sent out yet another army under Thabit ibn Khaytham, a Syrian commander from Jordan with previous North African experience. Thabit met Abd al-Wahid at the Battle of Baja in northwest Tunisia on the 4th of September 742. Ibn Khaytham was also defeated and killed resulting in the loss of many men as well as twenty thousand horses because of the lack of fodder. The surviving army consisting of twenty thousand men retreated to Kairouan.

After these series of disasters, Hanzala wrote to al-Mustanir ibn al Harith al-Harashi, the sub governor of Tunis, which was the Muslim naval base against Sicily, telling him to evacuate the city and come to Kairouan if he thought he could not hold out. And indeed he didn't feel he could and moved his troops and their families to Kairouan. At this point, Hanzala seems to have held little except al-Qayrawan. But he did not appeal for more troops, as he must have known none would come. 'Abd al-Wahid now occupied Tunis, flushed with his victories, He appears to have proclaimed himself caliph in rivalry to Ibn Hamid in Tangier.

Meanwhile, Hanzala mobilized all the forces he could find. He even armed noncombatants and women and also dug a trench around the city. Hanzala threw the bulk of his forces south, crushing Uqasha in the bloody Battle of al-Qarn and taking him prisoner. But Hanzala had taken a lot of losses himself and now faced the unhappy prospect of Abd al-Wahid's gigantic army. Hurrying back, Hanzala is said to have put the entire population of Kairouan under arms to bolster his ranks, before setting out again. In perhaps the bloodiest encounter in the Berber wars, Hanzala ibn Safwan defeated the great Berber army of Abd al-Wahid ibn Yazid at the Battle of al-Asnam around May 742 (perhaps a little later), just three miles outside of Kairouan. Some 120,000-180,000 Berbers, including Abd al-Wahid, fell in the field of battle in that single encounter. Uqasha was executed shortly after. According to historian Khalid Yahya Blankinship the number of Berber losses at al-Asnam is an exaggeration not to be trusted even in a vague way, as it may have been invented by the caliphal tradition to counterbalance the earlier record of utter failure in the Berber war.

Although Kairouan was saved for the caliphate, and with it the core of Ifriqiya, Hanzala ibn Safwan now faced the unenviable task of dragging the more westerly provinces, still under Berber sway, back into the fold. He would not have the chance to accomplish this.

=== Revolt in al-Andalus ===
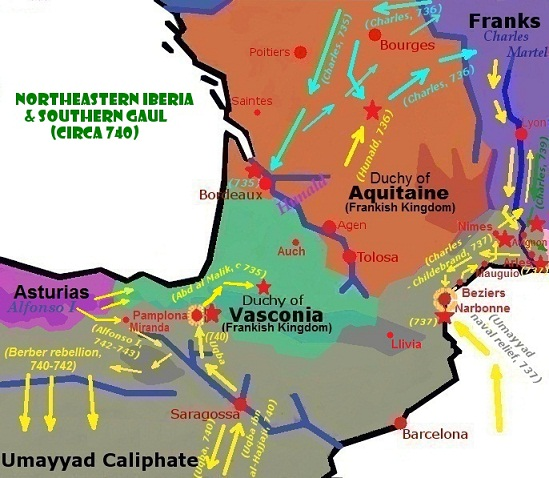
Military campaigns in northeastern al-Andalus and southern Gaul at the time of the Berber Revolt (740–742)

The coup installing Abd al-Malik ibn Qatn al-Fihri as ruler in al-Andalus in early 741 had been a failsafe device. But once the news of the disaster at Bagdoura spread, a general Berber uprising in al-Andalus could no longer be prevented. In October 741, Berber garrisons north of the Douro River mutinied. They discarded their Arab commanders and took to the field, abandoning their garrison posts to assemble their own Berber rebel army around the center and march against the Andalusian Arabs in the south.

Although their leaders' names have escaped us, the Andalusian Berber rebel army was organized into three columns – one to take Toledo (the main garrison city of the Central March), another to aim for Córdoba (the Umayyad capital), and the third to take Algeciras, where the rebels hoped to seize the Andalusian fleet to ferry additional Berber troops from North Africa.

With the frontier garrisons in the northwest suddenly evacuated, the Christian king Alfonso I of Asturias could hardly believe his luck and set about dispatching Asturian troops to seize the empty forts. With remarkable swiftness and ease the northwest was captured, and the banks of the upper Ebro were raided by Alfonso and permanently lost to al-Andalus. The Asturians devastated several towns and villages on the banks of the Douro River, and carried off local populations from the towns and villages in the Galician-Leonese lowlands back to the mountains, creating an empty buffer zone in the Douro River valley (the Desert of the Duero) between the Asturias in the north and al-Andalus in the south. This newly emptied frontier would remain in place for the next few centuries. It is alleged that pastoral Berber mountaineers remained behind in the highlands around Astorga and León. These trapped Berber communities were called "Maragatos" by the local Christian Leonese (etymology uncertain, possibly from mauri capti, "captive Moors"). Although eventually converted to Christianity, the Maragatos retained their distinctive dress, customs and lifestyle of Berber origin down to the early modern era.

=== Syrians in Al-Andalus ===
Through much of the winter of 741–42, the remnant of the Syrian expedition, some 10,000 men, under Balj ibn Bishr, remained trapped in Ceuta, besieged by the Berber rebels. The Andalusian ruler Abd al-Malik ibn Qatn al-Fihri, wary that the presence of the Syrians in Al-Andalus would only aggravate matters, denied them entry.

But news soon reached the Andalusian governor that the Berber rebel armies from the northwest had been organized and were now barreling south in three columns, towards Toledo, Córdoba and Algeciras.

Not having enough Arab forces at hand, the Andalusian governor Abd al-Malik realized he had little choice but to make use of the stranded Syrian force to defeat the Berber armies. In a carefully negotiated treaty, Abd al-Malik granted the Syrians permission to cross over, on the condition that they promise to return to North Africa within a year of the settlement of the Berber matter in Al-Andalus. Hostages were taken to secure Syrian compliance.

In early 742, the Syrian junds (under Balj ibn Bishr) crossed the Strait of Gibraltar and immediately headed to the environs of Medina-Sidonia, where they intercepted and disposed of the Berber column aiming for Algeciras. The Syrians then joined the Andalusian Arabs in crushing the main Berber rebel army in a ferocious battle outside of Córdoba in the Spring of 742. Shortly after, they proceeded to defeat the third Berber army, then laying siege to Toledo.

The Berber rebellion was quashed in Al-Andalus, but the Syrians showed no signs of intending to leave. When the Andalusian governor Abd al-Malik ibn Qatan ibn Fihri pressed the point, Balj ibn Bishr decided to simply depose him and proclaim himself governor, invoking his credentials as designated successor to his uncle, the late Ifriqiyan governor Kulthum ibn Iyad al-Qushayri. In revenge for the merchant of Ceuta, Balj ordered the elderly Ibn Qatan tortured to death.

A civil war was not short in occurring. Rallied by Qatan and Umayya, the sons of the late Fihrid governor, Andalusian Arabs took up arms against the Syrian junds. The Syrians delivered a decisive defeat upon the Andalusian at the Battle of Aqua Portora outside of Córdoba in August 742, but Balj ibn Bishr was mortally wounded in the field. Command of the Syrian armies devolved to Tha'laba ibn Salama al-Amili, and for the next few months, the Syrians remained bunkered down, while the Andalusians (soon joined by what remained of the Berber rebels), assembled in Mérida.

Much of the next few months was spent in an internecine Arab civil war, the Berber question relegated to a secondary concern. Eventually, tiring of war, the parties appealed to the Ifriqiyan emir Hanzala ibn Safwan al-Kalbi to resolve the matter. Hanzala dispatched his cousin Abu'l-Khattar al-Husam ibn Darar al-Kalbi as the new governor for al-Andalus. Abu al-Khattar arrived in May 743 and immediately set about restoring peace in Al-Andalus, liberating prisoners (Arab and Berber) and figuring a resolution to the displaced Syrian troops. He decided to distribute the various Syrian junds across Al-Andalus, carving out regimental fiefs in hitherto thinly-held areas: the Damascus jund was established in Elvira (Granada), the Jordan jund in Rayyu (Málaga and Archidona), the Palestine jund in Medina-Sidonia and Jerez, the Emesa (Homs) jund in Seville and Niebla and the Qinnasrin jund in Jaén. The Egypt jund was divided between Beja (Algarve) in the west and Tudmir (Murcia) in the east. (Al-Maqqari refers to an additional jund from Wasit (Iraq) that was settled in Cabra, but this jund is not recorded in other sources). The Syrian junds were allocated a third of the tax revenues collected in their regions, and given responsibilities of tax-collection and military service to the Andalusian governor.

The arrival of the Syrian junds would have tremendous implications for subsequent Andalusian history. They substantially increased the Arab element on the Iberian Peninsula, and, as such, were instrumental in deepening the Muslim hold on the south, what would become the heart of al-Andalus. But they also brought trouble. Unwilling to be governed, the Syrian junds carried on an existence of autonomous feudal anarchy, severely destabilizing the power of the governor of al-Andalus.

== Aftermath ==
Although the Berbers were victorious its success was still limited, as it failed to take Ifriqiya, and was defeated in Spain, it was still successful in breaking the Umayyads in Northwest Africa and led to the collapse of the Umayyad Caliphate in its entirety. The Umayyads would permanently lose these territories to the newly founded Berber polities.

As the Berbers dealt the Caliphate one catastrophic defeat after another in such a short period, the Caliphate's boundaries were pushed all the way to Kairouan, practically cutting off Spain. And despite Abu al-Khattar ibn Darar Al-Kalbi's accomplishments in stabilizing Al-Andalus, the days of caliphal authority in the region would be numbered, he himself would be its last Umayyad governor. The province would contribute to the fall of the Umayyad Caliphate by trapping a large portion of the Syrian troops who would refuse the opportunity to return home as they might have preferred holding the valuable country they had fought for and won.

Although it was not the sole reason, the Berber revolt remains a major factor to be considered while discussing the Abbasid Revolution and the end of the Umayyad Caliphate less than a decade later. The Syrian army on which Marwanid rule had been based on since the Second Fitna was uselessly immolated in profitless battles on many frontiers (such as the Battle of Bagdoura). The last reserves of Syrian manpower had been spent, mostly consumed uselessly, in North Africa. Survivors of Kulthum's army, clearly tired of fighting for the caliph, preferred to start new lives in Spain. Whatever last Syrian forces had been sent out to Kairouan with Hanzala were now stuck there. By the end of the revolt and Hisham's death, his successor Al-Walid II found himself extremely strapped for cash due to the previous catastrophic campaigns.

The Berber Caliphate ended up controlling most of Northwest Africa excluding Kairouan and some other areas, however the Berber Caliphate broke off into several independent Berber States such as the Barghawata state in Tamesna in 744, Emirate of Tlemcen in 742 and the Midrarid emirate in Sijilmasa in 758.

Later, non-Berber dynasties came to power with Berber support, such as the Rustamids, a dynasty of Persian descent who by 761 established an Imamate over the area of Tahert, in modern-day Algeria, and the Sharifian Idrisids in Morocco, by 789 considered as the founder dynasty of the modern Moroccan state.

Despite the Berber Caliphate not being able to capture Tunisia and Libya, the Berbers in the managed to take back Tunisia and Libya in the Berber-Fihrid War. Although not organized as states, many areas were ruled by Berber rebels such as Djerba, Wargla, Sétif,Tozeur, Gafsa and the Djebel Nafusa.

== See also ==
- Battle of Bagdoura
- Battle of the Nobles
- Muslim conquest of the Maghreb
- Berbers and Islam

== Sources ==
- al-Maqqari (1840-43 transl. by P. de Gayangos) The History of the Mohammedan dynasties in Spain, 2 vols, London: Royal Asiatic Society.
- Blankinship, Khalid Yahya (1994). The End of the Jihad State: The Reign of Hisham Ibn 'Abd Al-Malik and the Collapse of the Umayyads. SUNY Press. ISBN 0-7914-1827-8
- Fournel, Henri (1857) Étude sur la conquête de l'Afrique par les Arabes, Paris, Impermerie Imperiale.
- Heath, Jeffrey M (2002). Jewish and Muslim Dialects of Moroccan Arabic. London: Routledge. ISBN 0-7007-1514-2
- Holt, P M, Lambton, Ann K S. and Lewis, Bernard (1977). The Cambridge History of Islam. Cambridge University Press. ISBN 0-521-29137-2
- Hrbek, Ivan (1992), Africa from the Seventh to the Eleventh Century, 3rd, University of California Press,
- Ibn Khaldun (1852 transl.) Histoire des Berbères et des dynasties musulmanes de l'Afrique, Algiers.
- Lévi-Provençal, E. (1950)Histoire de l'Espagne musulmane, Tome 1, 1999 ed., Paris: Larose.
- Julien, Charles-André, Histoire de l'Afrique du Nord, des origines à 1830, édition originale 1931, réédition Payot, Paris, 1961
- Kennedy, Hugh (1996) Muslim Spain and Portugal: A Political History of al-Andalus, New York and London: Longman.
- Mercier, E. (1888) Histoire de l'Afrqiue septentrionale, V. 1, Paris: Leroux. Repr. Elibron Classics, 2005.
- Roth, A M and Roth, Norman (1994). Jews, Visigoths and Muslims in Medieval Spain: Cooperation and Conflict. Brill Academic Publishers. ISBN 90-04-09971-9
- Taha, Abd al-Wahid Dhannun (1989) The Muslim conquest and settlement of North Africa and Spain, London, Routledge.
