= Banu Amila =

Arabian tribe that settled in southern Lebanon

Banu Amila (Arabic: بَنُو عَامِلَة, Banū ʿĀmila), also spelled Amela, was an Arab tribe that historically dwelt in the Levant (greater Syria) during the Byzantine (3rd–7th centuries CE) and early Islamic periods (7th–11th centuries). Before or during the Crusades (late 11th–13th centuries) they made their abode in the mountainous region called after them, the Jabal Amil, in present-day Southern Lebanon. The long-established Shia Muslim community that lives in this region generally claims descent from the Amila, though the entire community's singular descent from the tribe has not been fully established.

== History ==
Irfan Shahîd contrasts the traditional view placing the Amila's emergence in Syria during the 3rd century, holding that the tribe formed a part of Nabataean confederacy along with Judham and Balqayn, and that their presence in the region goes back to Biblical times. Others have traced the tribe's origin back to Quda'a or even the Biblical Amalekites.

=== Byzantine period ===
From their then-settlement in southern Palestine (which they still occupied even during the Muslim conquest of the Levant), for centuries the Banu Amila acted as foederati (tribal confederates) of the Byzantines, helping guard the empire's frontiers against threats from the tribes of the Arabian Peninsula and the Persian-allied Lakhmids. They are believed to have settled in the area, possibly in the 3rd or 4th century, after moving from Iraq and through Palmyra. They were noted for their strong commitment to the empire in the 6th century and acknowledged Ghassanid supremacy among the Arab foederati. They were closely linked with their neighbors, the Banu Judham, and also allied to the Banu Kalb. The tribe was among the Arab foederati, who, alongside the Byzantine Empire, opposed the initial Muslim incursions into the Levant.

While little is known of their religious beliefs, they have been described as superficial followers of Monophysitism and were named Mutanasira (Christians who did not have firm belief in Christianity), as opposed to Nasara (Christians). Some even mention the tribe keeping some pagan practices. However, much later sources have described them as devoted Christians. Following the emergence of Islam, members of the tribe converted to Islam.

== Notable members ==
- Thalaba ibn Salama al-Amili, an Arab military commander in al-Urdunn, al-Maghreb and the Iberian Peninsula, and briefly ruler of al-Andalus from August 742 to May 743.

== See also ==
- Shia Islam in Lebanon
- Jabal Amil
- Tha'laba ibn Salama al-Amili

== Bibliography ==
- Chalabi, Tamara (2006). The Shi'is of Jabal Amil and the New Lebanon: Community and Nation State, 1918-1943. New York and Hampshire: Palgrave Macmillan. ISBN 978-1-349-53194-3.
- Gil, Moshe (1997). A History of Palestine, 634-1099 (revised ed.). Cambridge University Press. ISBN 9780521599849.
- Rihan, Mohammad (2014). The Politics and Culture of an Umayyad Tribe: Conflict and Factionalism in the Early Islamic Period. I.B.Tauris. ISBN 9781780765648.
- Shahid, Irfan (1984). Byzantium And The Arabs In The Fourth Century. Dumbarton Oaks. ISBN 9780884021162.
