= Banu Qushayr =

Sub-tribe of Banu Amir

The Banū Qushayr (Arabic: بنو قشير) was a branch of the Arab tribe of Banu Amir, historically resident in central Arabian Peninsula and later spreading to Khurasan, Iraq, Upper Mesopotamia.

== Genealogy ==
According to Arab genealogical tradition, the eponymous progenitor of the Banu Qushayr was a son of Ka'b ibn Rabi'a ibn Amir, thus making them a branch of the Banu Ka'b, itself a branch of the large tribe of Banu Amir. Qushayr’s brothers were progenitors of the large tribes of Banu Uqayl and Banu Ja'da. The mother of Qushayr was Rayta bint Kunfudh ibn Malik of the Banu Sulaym.

== History ==
In the pre-Islamic period, the Qushayr were attached to their parent tribe, the Banu Amir, and were resided in the region of al-Yamama (central Arabia). They were involved in all the wars between the Banu Amir and rival tribes, particularly the Banu Tamim and Banu Shayban. During one of these wars, the Qushayri leader Malik ibn Salama al-Khayr, known as Dhu'l-Ruqayba, captured the Shaybani chief Hajib ibn Zurara. The Salama al-Khayr family were the princely household of the Banu Qushayr.

The Qushayr embraced Islam along with the Banu Amir in 630. During the Muslim conquests of Syria and Mesopotamia, the Qushayr participated, but did not play a distinguished role. After the conquests, they largely settled in the eastern parts of the caliphate, such as Khurasan. During the Umayyad period (661–750), they maintained great numbers and power in that province and many of its governors, including Zurara ibn Uqba, hailed from the Salama al-Khayr family.

== Bibliography ==
- Della Vida, G. Levi (1986). "Kushayr". In Bosworth, C. E.; van Donzel, E.; Lewis, B. & Pellat, Ch. (eds.). The Encyclopaedia of Islam, Second Edition. Volume V: Khe–Mahi. Leiden: E. J. Brill. p. 526. ISBN 978-90-04-07819-2.
