= Jund al-Urdunn =

One of the five districts of Bilad ash-Sham during the period of the Arab Caliphates

- Province of the Umayyad, Abbasid and Fatimid Caliphates
- 630s–late 11th century
- Arab Syria (Bilad al-Sham) and its provinces under the Abbasid Caliphate in the 9th century
- Capital: Tiberias
- History
  - Established: 630s
  - Seljuk attacks, First Crusade: late 11th century
- Contained within
  - Province: Bilad al-Sham
| Preceded by | Succeeded by |
| Palaestina Secunda | Kingdom of Jerusalem; Seljuk Empire |
- Today part of: Israel; West Bank; Jordan; Lebanon

Jund al-Urdunn (Arabic: جُـنْـد الْأُرْدُنّ, translation: "The military district of Jordan") was one of the five districts of Bilad al-Sham (Islamic Syria) during the early Islamic period. It was established under the Rashidun and its capital was Tiberias throughout its rule by the Umayyad and Abbasid caliphates. It encompassed southern Mount Lebanon, the Galilee, the southern Hauran, the Golan Heights, and most of the eastern Jordan Valley (especially in the north).

== Subdistricts and major towns ==
The 10th-century geographer Ibn al-Faqih held that besides its capital at Tiberias, the Urdunn's chief districts (qura) were Samaria (al-Samira in Arabic), i.e. Nablus, Beisan, Qadas, Pella (Fahl in Arabic), Jerash, Acre (Akka in Arabic), and Tyre (Sur in Arabic). The geographer al-Muqaddasi (d. 985) notes that the principal towns of the district were its capital Tiberias, Qadas, Tyre, Acre, Faradiyya, Kabul, Beisan, Lajjun and Adhri'at. The 13th-century geographer Yaqut al-Hamawi counted the quras of Urdunn as Tiberias, Beisan, Acre, Beit Ras, Jadar (Jaydur, area adjacent to the east of the Golan Heights), Tyre and Saffuriya.

The geographers Ibn Hawqal (d. c. 978) and Estakhri (d. 957) noted the Ghawr (Jordan Valley) district, the low-lying area along the Jordan River between Lake Tiberias to the Dead Sea, with its capital at Jericho (Ariha in Arabic), was administratively subordinate to Urdunn. The geographer al-Ya'qubi (d. 892) held that the Ghawr was subordinate to Jund Dimashq.

== Population ==
=== Galilee ===
The Galilee was referred to as "Jabal al-Jalil" by the 9th century Arab geographer Ya'qubi (d. 891), who noted that its residents were Banu Amilah Arabs. Michael Ehrlich asserts that while the majority of people in the Western Galilee and Lower Galilee probably embraced Islam during the early Islamic period, the Islamization process in the Eastern Galilee took a little longer and lasted until the Mamluk period.

== Governors ==
=== Rashidun period ===
- Yazid ibn Abi Sufyan (639, appointed by Caliph Umar after the death of the overall governor of Syria Abu Ubayda ibn al-Jarrah; concurrently governed the junds of Dimashq and Filastin)
- Mu'awiya ibn Abi Sufyan (639-), may have been appointed to the post by Umar after the death of his brother Yazid in 639, when he was appointed to Dimashq)
  - Abu al-A'war al-Sulami, governor under Mu'awiya.

=== Umayyad period ===
- Abu Uthman ibn Marwan ibn al-Hakam (685–705, governed for unspecified period during his brother Caliph Abd al-Malik's rule; identified by Moshe Gil as Aban ibn Marwan, while Asad Q. Ahmed identified him with another brother of Abd al-Malik, Uthman ibn Marwan)
- Ubayda ibn Abd al-Rahman al-Sulami (685–705, governed for unspecified period during Abd al-Malik's reign; nephew of Abu al-A'war)
- Umar ibn al-Walid (705–715, governed during the rule of his father Caliph al-Walid I)
- Ubada ibn Nusayy al-Kindi (717–720, governed during the rule of Caliph Umar II)
- Ishaq ibn Qabisa ibn Dhu'ayb al-Khuza'i (724–743, governed during the rule of Caliph Hisham; son of one of Abd al-Malik's brother-in-laws and secretaries)
- Tha'laba ibn Salama al-Amili
- Al-Walid ibn Mu'awiya ibn Marwan (744–750, governed during the rule of his cousin Caliph Marwan II; a nephew of Abd al-Malik)

=== Abbasid period ===
- Abdallah ibn Ali (752–753, governed during the rule of his nephew Caliph al-Saffah)
  - Ziyad ibn Abi al-Ward (amil, i.e. a fiscal supervisor, under Abdallah ibn Ali))
- Muhammad ibn Ibrahim (754–775, governed during the rule of his uncle Caliph al-Mansur; also governed Dimashq during al-Mansur's rule)

== See also ==
- the region of Syria
- Jordan River
- Jund Filastin
- Levant
- Mashriq
- Middle East
- Palaestina Secunda
- Shaam

== Bibliography ==
- Ahmed, Asad Q. (2010). The Religious Elite of the Early Islamic Ḥijāz: Five Prosopographical Case Studies. Oxford: University of Oxford Linacre College Unit for Prosopographical Research. ISBN 978-1-900934-13-8.
- Amitai-Preiss, Nitzan (2015). "What Happened in 155/771-72? The Testimony of Lead Seals". In Talmon-Heller, Daniella; Cytryn-Silverman, Katia (eds.). Material Evidence and Narrative Sources: Interdisciplinary Studies of the History of the Muslim Middle East. Leiden and Boston: Brill. ISBN 978-90-04-27159-3.
- Crone, Patricia (1980). Slaves on Horses: The Evolution of the Islamic Polity (1980 ed.). Cambridge: Cambridge University Press. ISBN 978-0521229616.
- Gil, Moshe (1997) [1983]. A History of Palestine, 634–1099. Translated by Ethel Broido. Cambridge: Cambridge University Press. ISBN 0-521-59984-9.
- Hinds, M. (1993). "Muʿāwiya I b. Abī Sufyān". In Bosworth, C. E.; van Donzel, E.; Heinrichs, W. P. & Pellat, Ch. (eds.). The Encyclopaedia of Islam, Second Edition. Volume VII: Mif–Naz. Leiden: E. J. Brill. pp. 263–268. ISBN 978-90-04-09419-2.
- Sharon, Moshe (1999). Corpus Inscriptionum Arabicarum Palaestinae (CIAP) Volume Two: B-C. Leiden, Boston and Koln: Brill. ISBN 90-04-11083-6.
- le Strange, Guy (1890). Palestine Under the Moslems: A Description of Syria and the Holy Land from A.D. 650 to 1500. London: Committee of the Palestine Exploration Fund. OCLC 1004386.
