= Hawwara =

Arab-Berber tribal confederation

Hawwara Ihuwwaren الهوارة
- Tribal confederation
- Ethnicity: Berber
- Location: Mainly Tripolitania
- Demonym: Al-Hawwari
- Branches: Addasa, Andara, Awtita, Baswa, Gharyan, Haragha, Banu Irmazyan, Kaldin, Kamlan, Karkuda, Lahan or Lahana, Maghar, Malila, Maslata, Mindasa or Mindas (Mandasa, Mandas), Misrata, Razin, Satat, Tarhuna, Wannifan, Warfalla, Wargha, Warsatifa, Washtata, Yaghmorasen, Zakkawa and Zanzafa
- Religion: Islam

The Hawwara (Arabic: الهوارة) is a Berber tribal confederation in the Maghreb, primarily in Tripolitania, with descendants in Upper Egypt and Sudan. Hawwara are amongst the most prominent tribes in Upper Egypt, with branches found mainly in Qena. They are also found in Morocco and Algeria. In Sudan, they are labelled as Hawwaweer (Arabic: هواوير) (plural of Hawwara), and have a significant political presence.

The Hawwara are the heirs of the ancient western Bavares. During the Arab Muslim conquest of the Maghreb, the Hawwara tribe was subdued by Musa ibn Nusayr and Arabised. In the 10th century, a fraction of the Hawwara were part the Fatimid army that conquered Egypt, Syria, Palestine and Jordan. In the 11th century, families originating from the Hawwara founded and ruled small Islamic kingdoms in al-Andalus (the Iberian Peninsula), including the Dhulnunid dynasty, which ruled the Taifa of Toledo and the Banu Razin, who ruled the Taifa of Albarracín.

== Branches ==
The Hawwara are composed of numerous tribes and clans. Some of them are: the Addasa, the Andara, the Awtita, the Baswa, the Gharyan, the Haragha, the Banu Irmazyan, the Kaldin, the Kamlan, the Karkuda, the Lahan or Lahana, the Maghar, the Malila, the Maslata, the Mindasa or Mindas (Mandasa, Mandas), the Misrata, the Razin, the Satat, the Tarhuna, the Wannifan, the Warfalla, the Wargha, the Warsatifa, the Washtata, the Yaghmorasen, the Zakkawa and the Zanzafa.

== History ==
=== Origins ===
The Hawwara are the heirs of the ancient western Bavares. In classical antiquity, the Hawwara were one of the principal tribes located within the Masaesyli state. The traditional territory that was called Avaritana/Abaritana provincia by Quodvultdeus of Carthage later became known as “bilad Haouara”, country of the Haouara (of the Aurès) in the middle ages. During the Byzantine period, the area called “Abaritana atque Getulia provincia” was a tribal principality, and the Hawwara were one of the two major ruling confederations. Medieval historians have also attested the presence of the Hawwara in the Aurès region well before the arrival of the Arabs in the seventh century. Edrici placed the location of the Hawwara in the plains of M’Sila. From the eighth century to twelfth century, the eastern boundaries of their land ran through Tawergha, Waddan, and Zella. Hawwara's territory was bordered to the east by the Mazata tribe.

=== In the Iberian Peninsula ===
Families originating from the Hawwara founded and ruled small Islamic kingdoms in al-Andalus (the Iberian Peninsula) during the eleventh century, including the Dhulnunid dynasty, which ruled the Taifa of Toledo and the Banu Razin, who ruled the Taifa of Albarracín. The latter still being the name of a Spanish town named Albarracín or Al Banu Razin, a sub-tribe of Hawwara. Other Spanish cities including Alhaurín el Grande and Alhaurín de la Torre also get there name from the Hawwara (Al Hawwariyin).

=== In Egypt ===
A fraction of the Hawwara were part the Fatimid army that conquered Egypt, Syria, Palestine and Jordan. After the conquest, they were given land grants by the Fatimid caliphs. The Hawwara tribe became dominant in El Beheira in Egypt. In 1380/1381, Barquq, Sultan of the Mamluks, established some Hawwara groups in Upper Egypt and granted the Iqta' of Girga to the Hawwari chief, Isma'il ibn Mazin. Isma'il was succeeded by Umar, the eponymous of the Banu Umar clan.

=== Ruling Upper Egypt ===
According to Al-Maqrizi in his book ‘kitāb as-sulūk’, a group of Hawwara together with a group of Arabs from Upper Egypt attacked the wali of Aswan in the month of Rajab 798 AH (April 1396) and allied with the Arab tribe of Banu Kanz who inhabited Aswan. Al-Maqrizi also writes in his book Al Khetat that in the month of Muharram 815 AH (1412) the Hawwara tribesmen proceeded to Aswan and attacked the Banu Kanz. The Arab men fled, but many of them were killed while the women and children were taken into slavery. They destroyed the walls of the city and left it in ruins, without inhabitants. After sacking al-Fayyum in 1485, the Hawwara tribes became the true rulers of Upper Egypt.

According to Johann Ludwig Burckhardt in his book ‘Travels in Nubia’, many Christian Copts in Upper Egypt were slaves to the Hawwara chieftains. In the villages of Upper Egypt where Copts were settled, they would choose one of the Hawwara sheiks as his master, whom he called “my bedouin” while the sheik would call him “my christian”. The Copt then became like a member of his masters family; if he was poor, his master sent to his house provisions of corn and butter and gave him clothes every year; but in return, he was obliged to be constantly attending to his masters orders; assisting him in his field labours, doing all kinds of work for him and accompanying him like a servant whenever the sheik went to meet equals or superiors. If the Copt happened to be in good circumstances, he was obliged to make occasional presents to his master, who exempted him on that account from hard work and protected him from the oppressions of any other sheik. If the daughter of a Coptic servant was to get married, his Hawwara master would enter her house on the wedding night and put an iron chain around her ankles which he secured with a padlock, and the bridegroom was obliged to make him a present in order to have the padlock opened and the girl restored to freedom. The possession of these Christians was transmitted by the sheiks to their descendants.

In Egypt's history, the Southern region is the cradle of tribal settlements. By the nineteenth century, Southern Egypt and Northern Nubia were completely ruled-over by the Egyptian Hawwara tribe. Governance had become decentralized as the Hawwara spread their sovereignty over ten provinces and parts of the other remaining twenty-one provinces in Upper Egypt. The Egyptian Hawwara branch was deemed to be the de facto rulers of Upper Egypt and their authority spanned across North Africa.

=== End of their rule in upper Egypt ===
Ibrahim Pasha' campaign in 1813, crushed their dominant influence, and made them flee in masses to the Sudan.

In past times, and before fleeing into Sudan due to the campaigns of Ibrahim Pasha of Egypt, the Hawwara were the most influential tribe in Upper Egypt under the leadership of Sheikh Al-Arab Hammam. Sultan Barquq (d. 1399) made relationships with the Hawwara to keep the Arab tribes from becoming powerful. Towards the end of the Mamluk dynasty, the Hawwara and Arabs began cooperating to kill Mamluks. Due to their cooperation, the Mamluks labeled the Hawwara as Arab. Although like many they are rather arabized, the term "Sheikh of the Arabs" is usually bestowed upon any tribal leaders, however, according to Burckhardt, the Hawwara claim their ancient origin to be from the Maghreb region.
