= Abd al-Malik ibn Qatn al-Fihri =

8th-century Umayyad governor of Al-Andalus

Abd al-Malik ibn Qatn al-Fihri (Arabic: عبد الملك بن قطن الفهري) was an Umayyad Arab governor of Al-Andalus during two periods from 732 to 734 and from 740 to 742.

Abd al-Malik was a very wealthy member of a noble Arab family from the Hejaz. Spurred by critics who decried his lack of military victories, he led an expedition north to Pamplona, where a Frankish or Aquitanian party had taken over after the Battle of Poitiers. Despite his failure to capture the Basque fortress, he left troops to invest it, and decided to continue his way north across the Pyrenees, where he engaged the Basques in skirmishes and was eventually overcome, but managed to escape back to Al-Andalus.

After being deposed and incarcerated by his successor Uqba ibn al-Hajjaj or possibly the governor of Ifriqiya ("was bound in chains"), he made his way back to prominence in 740, when he was appointed Wāli (governor) of Al-Andalus again after the former´s natural death. This time he had to deal with the serious Berber rebellion in North Africa. The governor saw no option but to take the Syrian troops commanded by his adversary Balj ibn Bishr al-Qushayri as allies to quash the rebellion, thus putting down the uprisings.

However, ultimately Balj ibn Bishr al-Qushayri had him arrested in Córdoba for former grievances, put him to a horrible death in 742, and had him crucified on the outskirts of the city flanked by a similarly killed pig and dog on either side.

Preceded by Abdul Rahman Al Ghafiqi	Governor of Al-Andalus; 732–734	Succeeded by Uqba ibn al-Hajjaj al-Saluli
Preceded by Uqba ibn al-Hajjaj al-Saluli	Governor of Al-Andalus; 740–742	Succeeded by Balj ibn Bishr al-Qushayri
