= Khalid ibn Hamid al-Zanati =

Berber chieftain and military commander

Khalid ibn Hamid al-Zanati خالد بن حامد الزناتي
- Predecessor: Maysara al-Matghari
- Successor: Abu Qurra
- Military career
- Allegiance: Berber insurgents
- Conflicts: Berber Revolt: Battle of the Nobles (740); Battle of Bagdura (741)

Khalid ibn Hamid al-Zanati (Arabic: خالد بن حامد الزناتي) was a Zenata Berber chieftain and military commander during the Berber Revolt of the 740s against the Umayyads in the Maghreb.

For reasons which are still obscure (possibly cowardice), Maysara al-Matghari, the original leader of the Berber Revolt and self-proclaimed caliph, was deposed and executed by fellow Berber rebels in the Summer or Fall of 740. Khalid ibn Hamid was elected to take his place

Khalid ibn Hamid led the Berber rebel armies in two stunning victories over the Umayyad authorities. In the Battle of the Nobles in late 740, Khalid annihilated an army composed of Arab forces sent from Ifriqiya. The shock of the defeat prompted the Umayyad Caliph Hisham to dispatch a mighty Syrian expeditionary force from the east to join the Ifriqiyans in crushing the Berber rebellion. In October 741, Khalid's Berber army defeated the combined Ifriqiyan-Syrian force at the Battle of Bagdoura (or Baqdura), by the Sebou River (near modern Fes), killing the new Ifriqyian governor Kulthum ibn Iyad al-Qasi, in the process. The Berber revolt continued for a little while longer, but under different commanders.
