= Battle of the Nobles =

740 battle

- Part of Berber Revolt
Date	740 (Note: The exact year of the battle remains unclear, because multiple sources give conflicting dates. Although, sources do narrow the years to either 740 or 741 AD. Khalid Blankinship dates it as Al Muharam 123/ December 740.)
Location	banks of the Chelif River, near Chlef (Disputed)
Result	Berber victory

Belligerents
Umayyad Caliphate	Berber insurgents

Commanders and leaders
Khalid ibn Abi Habib †	Khalid ibn Hamid al-Zanati

Casualties and losses
High	Unknown

The Battle of the Nobles (Arabic: غزوة الأشراف, romanized: Ghazwat al-Ashrāf) was an important confrontation in the Berber Revolt in c. 740 AD. It resulted in a major Berber victory over the Arabs in banks of the Chelif River, near Chlef (Algeria). During the battle, numerous Arab aristocrats were slaughtered, which led to the conflict being called the "Battle of the Nobles". Zenata Berber chieftain Khalid ibn Hamid al-Zanati led the revolting Berber soldiers.

== Location ==
According to the majority of historian, the battle took place on the wadi Chelif (present-day Algeria).

Charles-André Julien, while also reporting that the battle took place on Chelif, notes that this would imply that the Kharejite revolt would have reached central Zenetia, which would confirm the thesis of Émile-Félix Gautier. According to him, Arab historians other than Ibn Khaldun place the battle in northern Morocco. The discrepancy perhaps comes from the copy of Ibn Khaldun's text which would have substituted, in Arabic, the word "Chelif" for "Sebou" which have a similar spelling in this language. This uncertainty therefore casts doubt on the location of the battle.

== Background ==
The Maghreb in the early eighth century was under Umayyad rule. The Berber Revolt broke out in early 740 in western Morocco, in response to the oppressive, unfair (and, by Islamic law, illegal) tax-collection and slave-tribute policies imposed upon Muslim Berbers by the governor Ubayd Allah ibn al-Habhab of Kairouan, governor of Ifriqiya and overlord of the Maghreb and al-Andalus. The Berber rebellion was inspired by Kharijite activists of the Sufrite sect, who held out the promise of a new puritan Islamic order, without ethnic or tribal discrimination, a prospect appealing to the long-suffering Berbers.

The revolt began under the leadership of the Berber chieftain (alleged water-carrier) Maysara al-Matghari. The Berber rebels successfully seized Tangiers and much of western Morocco by the late summer of 740.

The Berbers had timed their uprising carefully. The bulk of the Ifriqiyan army, under command of the general Habib ibn Abi Obeida al-Fihri, was at that moment overseas, on an expedition to conquer Sicily. The governor Obeid Allah ibn el-Habhab immediately dispatched instructions ordering Habib to break off the expedition and ship the army back to Africa. But this would take time. So, in the meantime, Obeid Allah assembled a cavalry-heavy column composed of much of the aristocratic elite of Kairouan, and placed it under the command of Khalid ibn Abi Habib al-Fihri (probably Habib's brother). This column was dispatched immediately to Tangiers and instructed to serve as the vanguard and to keep the Berber rebels in check, until the Sicilian expeditionary force disembarked and caught up with them. A second, smaller reserve army, under Abd al-Rahman ibn al-Mughira al-Adhari, was sent to Tlemcen, and instructed to hold there in case the Berber army should break through to Ifriqiya.

=== First Encounter ===
Maysara's Berber forces encountered the vanguard Ifrqiyan column of Khalid ibn Abi Habib somewhere on the outskirts of Tangiers. After a brief skirmish, Maysara ordered the Berber armies to fall back. Rather than give pursuit, the Arab cavalry commander Khalid ibn Abi Habib held the line just south of Tangiers, blockading the Berber-held city while awaiting the reinforcements from the Sicilian expedition. Regrouping after these skirmishes, the Berber rebels deposed and killed their leader, Maysara al-Matghari, and elected the Zenata Berber chieftain, Khalid ibn Hamid al-Zanati, as the new Berber commander. The reasons for Maysara's fall are not altogether clear - possibly because his sudden cowardice shown before the Arab cavalry column proved him military unfit, possibly because the puritan Sufrite preachers found a flaw in the piety of his character, or simply because the Zenata tribal chieftains, being closer to the Ifriqiyan frontline, felt they should be the ones leading the rebellion.

== Battle ==
The army that was dispatched from Ifriqiya was attacked on the banks of the Chelif river. The Berber rebels overwhelmed and completely defeated the army of Khalid ibn Abi Habib, massacring the cream of the Ifriqiyan Arab nobility.

== Aftermath ==
News of the slaughter of the Ifriqiyan nobles spread like a shock-wave. The reserve army of Ibn al-Mughira in Tlemcen fell into a panic. Seeing Sufrite preachers everywhere around the city, the troops launched a series of indiscriminate massacres, provoking a massive uprising in the hitherto-quiet city.

This Arab overreaction to the defeat would cause many initially neutral Berbers (such as the Sufrites) to join the ranks of the revolt.

The Sicilian expeditionary army of Habib ibn Abi Obeida arrived too late to prevent the massacre of the nobles. Realizing they were in no position to take on the Berbers by themselves, they retreated to Tlemcen to gather the reserves, only to find that that city too was now in disarray and the troops killed or scattered.

Habib ibn Abi Obeida entrenched what remained of the Ifriqiyan army in the vicinity of Tlemcen (perhaps as far back as Tahert), and called upon Kairouan for reinforcements. The request was forwarded to Damascus.

Hearing of the defeat of the nobles, Caliph Hisham is said to have exclaimed "By God, I will most certainly rage against them with an Arab rage, and I will send against them an army whose beginning is where they are and whose end is where I am!".

In February, 741, the Umayyad Caliph Hisham appointed Kulthum ibn Iyad al-Qasi to replace the disgraced Obeid Allah as governor in Ifriqiya. Kulthum was to be accompanied by a fresh Arab army of 30,000 raised from the Syrian regiments (junds in Arabic) of the east. This would set up the even more momentous Battle of Bagdoura in late 741.

== See also ==
- Berbers and Islam
- Muslim conquest of the Maghreb
