= 740s =

Decade

The 740s decade ran from January 1, 740, to December 31, 749.

== Events ==
=== By place ===
==== Byzantine Empire ====
- Battle of Akroinon: Following the disastrous Battle of Sebastopolis (see 692), Emperor Leo III has largely confined himself to a defensive strategy, while the Umayyad armies regularly launch raids into Byzantine-held Anatolia. Caliph Hisham ibn Abd al-Malik assembles an expeditionary force (90,000 men) under his son Sulayman ibn Hisham. One of these armies, 20,000 men strong under Abdallah al-Battal, is defeated at Akroinon (modern-day Afyon) by the Byzantines, led by Leo and his son, the future emperor Constantine V. About 6,800 Muslim Arabs, however, resist and manage to conduct an orderly retreat to Synnada (Phrygia).
- October 26 – 740 Constantinople earthquake. An earthquake strikes Constantinople and the surrounding countryside, causing destruction to the city's land walls and buildings.

==== Europe ====
- The Berber tribes in the recently conquered region of Galicia (northwest Spain) rebel. This facilitates the establishment of an independent kingdom in the Cantabrian Mountains under King Alfonso I of Asturias.
- Duke Thrasimund II recovers the duchy of Spoleto and kills Hilderic with Papal-Beneventian aid. He does not return the confiscated papal cities, and his alliance with Pope Gregory III ruptures.
- December – King Liutprand of the Lombards attempts to counter the growing independence of the Lombard duchies in southern Italy.
- Sicily, Sardinia, Provence, and Greece are raided by a fleet of Arab Muslim ships sent by the governor of Ifriqya, the ones raiding South Western Europe are led by Habīb Ibn Abi ‘Ubayda Al-Fihrī, while the fleet raiding Greece is led by Mu’awiya ibn Hishām. All of them are successful, submitting the Islands and returning with much wealth from the spoils of war.

==== Britain ====
- King Eadberht of Northumbria marches his army north to attack the Picts. King Æthelbald of Mercia takes advantage of his absence, and ravages the city of York. Internal struggles re-emerge in Northumbria with the murder of Eardwine, probably the son of the late usurping king Eadwulf I.
- King Æthelheard of Wessex dies after a 14-year reign. He is succeeded by his brother (and probably distant relative) Cuthred. Æthelbald of Mercia takes control of Berkshire from Wessex.

==== Africa ====
- Battle of the Nobles: The Berber rebels under chieftain Khalid ibn Hamid al-Zanati defeat and overwhelm the Umayyad forces of Khalid ibn Abi Habib al-Fihri, near Tangier (Northern Morocco), undermining Arab domination in Islamic North Africa. The rebellion spreads in Al-Andalus (Spain), causing governor Ubayd Allah ibn al-Habhab to withdraw Moorish troops from many garrisons north of the Pyrenees.

==== Asia ====
- Much to the delight of the citizens of Chang'an, the Chinese government of the Tang dynasty orders fruit trees to be planted along every main avenue of the city, which enriches not only the diets of the people but also the surroundings (approximate date)
- Fujiwara no Hirotsugu Rebellion: The Fujiwara clan led by Fujiwara no Hirotsugu, dissatisfied with the political powers in Japan, raise an army in Dazaifa (Kyushu) but are defeated by government forces.
- The Japanese imperial capital is moved from Heijō-kyō to Kuni-kyō.

=== By topic ===
==== Religion ====
- The Khazars, a nation of the Black Sea steppe, though not ethnically Jewish, voluntarily convert to Judaism.
- Cuthbert becomes archbishop of Canterbury after the death of Nothhelm (see 739).

=== By place ===
==== Byzantine Empire ====
- June 18 – Emperor Leo III ("the Isaurian") dies of dropsy at Constantinople, after a 24-year reign that has saved the Byzantine Empire and delivered Eastern Europe from the threat of an Arab conquest. He is succeeded by his son Constantine V.
- Artabasdos, Byzantine general (strategos) of the Armeniac theme, defeats Constantine V and advances on Constantinople, where he is crowned emperor. He secures the support of the themes of Thrace and Opsikion, and abandons Leo's religious policy of iconoclasm. Constantine seeks the support of the Anatolic theme.

==== Central America ====
- February 11 – Wak Chanil Ajaw (Lady Six Sky), queen of the Mayan city state of Naranjo in Guatemala, dies after a reign of more than 47 years and is succeeded by her son, Yax Mayuy Chan Chaak, who reigns until his own death in 744.
- June 23 – Kʼawiil Chan Kʼinich becomes the new ruler of the Mayan city state at Dos Pilas in Guatemala after the death of Ucha'an K'in B'alam and reigns until 761 when he is forced to flee during an uprising by rebels from Tamarindito.

==== Europe ====
- October 22 – Charles Martel, Merovingian mayor of the palace, dies in his palace at Quirzy-sur-Oise (modern-day Picardy). His territories are divided between his adult sons Carloman and Pepin the Short, although the Frankish Kingdom has had no true king since the death of Theuderic IV (see 737). Lands to the east, including Austrasia and Alemannia (with Bavaria as a vassal) go to Carloman, while Pepin receives Neustria and Burgundy (with Aquitaine as a vassal). Grifo, youngest son of Charles, succeeds him as mayor of the palace, and probably receives a strip of land between Neustria and Austrasia.
- Pepin the Short marries Bertrada of Laon, daughter of Count Charibert of Laon.

==== Switzerland ====
- In 741 and 744, documents in the archives of St. Gallen Abbey describe the village of Kempraten as Centoprato, another document in 863 as Centiprata, inspired by the Latin name Centum Prata. ^{(Unclear significance)}
- A nunnery given by the Alamannic noblewoman Beata on Lützelau island is first mentioned. In 744, the nunnery is sold to Einsiedeln Abbey. ^{(Unclear significance)}
- Ufenau island in Switzerland is first mentioned in 741 as "Hupinauia", and in 744 as "Ubinauvia" — island of Huppan of Huphan. ^{(Unclear significance)}

==== Africa ====
- The Great Berber Revolt: Caliph Hisham ibn Abd al-Malik appoints Kulthum ibn Iyad al-Qasi as governor (wali) of Ifriqiya (North Africa). A fourth expedition is sent from Syria by the Umayyad Caliphate to crush the rebellion in the Atlas region, but is defeated at the Battle of Bagdoura, in the plain of the Ghrab (modern Morocco). The counter-attack of the Kharijite rebels to the East is successful, but fails to conquer Kairouan from the loyalists. A more radical branch of the Tunisian Kharijites, (the Sufrists) however, manages to take the city soon after.

=== By topic ===
==== Religion ====
- November 28 – Pope Gregory III dies at Rome, after a 10-year reign. He is succeeded by Zachary, as the 91st pope of the Catholic Church.
- April 23 – A fire destroys the English city of York Minster, including its Church. The church is later rebuilt as a more impressive structure, containing thirty altars.
- Japanese authorities decree that Buddhist temples should be established throughout the country (approximate date).

=== By place ===
==== Europe ====
- King Liutprand of the Lombards meets Pope Zachary at Terni (Central Italy), who appeals to the king's religious faith. Liutprand is a pious Catholic and signs a 20-year peace treaty, restoring the cities of the Duchy of Rome which he has captured. The independent Lombard duchies of Spoleto and Benevento absorb into the Lombard Kingdom.
- Arab-Byzantine Wars: Arab forces under Sulayman ibn Hisham invade Anatolia, reaching as far as Herakleia, and return with much wealth and livestock.
- Umayyad conquest of Hispania: Arab forces under Abd al-Malik ibn Katan al-Fihri, governor (wali) of Al-Andalus, suppress the Berber rebellion in the region of Mértola (modern Portugal).
- Teodato Ipato succeeds his father Orso Ipato, as the fourth doge of Venice. He moves the capital from Heraclea to Malamocco.

==== Africa ====
- The Great Berber Revolt: Muslim forces under Handhala ibn Safwan al-Kalbi, governor of Egypt, break out of besieged Kairouan (Tunisia). He scatters the Berbers, the western and central Maghreb remained under the control of the Berber Kharijites.

==== Asia ====
- Emperor Xuan Zong begins to favor Taoism over Buddhism, adopting the new reign title Tianbao ("Heavenly Treasures"), to indicate his divine mandate. The total number of enlisted troops in the Tang armies has risen to about half a million, due to Xuan Zongs's earlier military reforms.
- For the municipal census of the Chinese capital city Chang'an and its metropolitan area of Jingzhou (including small towns in the vicinity), the New Book of Tang records that in this year there are 362,921 registered families with 1,960,188 people.
- Li Bai (also Li Po), Chinese poet, is summoned by Xuan Zong to attend the imperial court. He and his friend Du Fu become the two most prominent figures in the flourishing of Chinese poetry, during the mid-Tang dynasty.

=== By topic ===
==== Religion ====
- After a 40-year vacancy, Stephen IV becomes Orthodox patriarch of Antioch, at the suggestion of caliph Hisham ibn Abd al-Malik.
- Chrodegang, chancellor of Charles Martel, is appointed bishop of Metz and embarks on a reorganisation of the Frankish church.
- Sturm, disciple of Boniface, establishes the Benedictine Abbey of Fulda (present-day Hesse) in Germany (or 744).
- The Holy Face of Lucca is transferred to Lucca from Luni (approximate date).

=== By place ===
==== Byzantine Empire ====
- Summer – Emperor Constantine V defeats his brother-in-law Artabasdos, who has led a two-year insurrection in an attempt to usurp the Byzantine throne. He heads for Constantinople, and captures the capital three months later. Artabasdos and his son Niketas are publicly blinded, and relegated to the monastery of Chora. Constantine renews his policy of Iconoclasm.
- Constantine V reforms the old Imperial Guard of Constantinople into new elite cavalry and infantry units, called tagmata (Greek for 'the regiments'). He uses these troops against a rebellious theme in north-west Anatolia (modern Turkey), and later for offensive campaigns against Arab Muslim raiders and Bulgars.

==== Europe ====
- Childeric III succeeds to the throne of the Frankish Kingdom as the last Merovingian king, (until his death in 754) following an interregnum of seven years after the throne was left vacant after the death of the previous king Theuderic IV. Power remains firmly in the hands of the major domus, currently Carloman and Pepin the Short.
- Duke Odilo of Bavaria comes to the aid of Boruth, prince (knyaz) of the Carantanians, against repeated Avar incursions in present-day Austria, and is able to vassalize the Slavic principality. In exchange for Bavarian assistance, Boruth accepts his overlordship and is converted to Christianity.

==== Britain ====
- King Æthelbald of Mercia joins forces with Wessex and attacks Gwent and Powys in Mid Wales (approximate date).

==== Arabian Empire ====
- February 6 – Caliph Hisham ibn Abd al-Malik dies after a 19-year reign, in which the Arab expansion in Europe has been stopped and the Umayyad Caliphate has come under pressure from the Turks in Central Asia and Berbers in North Africa. He is succeeded by his nephew Al-Walid II, who has Khalid al-Qasri, former governor of Iraq, imprisoned and tortured.

==== Japan ====
- Emperor Shōmu changes the law of Perpetual Ownership of Cultivated Lands. This permits aristocrats and members of the clergy to cultivate land. The new farmland will be called shoin.

==== Americas ====
- In one of the final battles of the Third Tikal-Calakmul War, the city of El Peru is taken by Tikal.

==== Asia ====
- 743 Caspian Gates earthquake. It took place in the Caspian Gates (Gates of Alexander). The location is identified with either Derbent, Russia or Talis, Iran.

=== By topic ===
==== Religion ====
- The Concilium Germanicum: First major Church synod held in the eastern parts of the Frankish Kingdom. Organized by Carloman, Mayor of the Palace of Austrasia, and presided over by Saint Boniface, who is solidified in his position as leader of the Frankish church.

=== By place ===
==== Europe ====
- February – King Liutprand of the Lombards dies of natural causes after a 32-year reign, in which he has defeated the dukes of Spoleto and Benevento, bringing the Lombard Kingdom to the height of her power. He is succeeded by Hildeprand, called "the Useless" (nephew or grandson of Liutprand), as ruler of the Lombards.
- October – Hildeprand is deposed by the council of nobles, for his incompetence as ruler. He is succeeded by Ratchis (formerly duke of Friuli) as king of the Lombards, who makes peace with Pope Zachary.
- Pepin the Short, mayor of the palace of Neustria and Burgundy, invades the Swabian Jura (southwestern Germany), and chases Theudebald, Duke of Alamannia, from his mountain redoubt in Alsace.

==== Switzerland ====
- In 741 and 744, documents in the archives of St. Gallen Abbey describe the village of Kempraten as Centoprato, another document in 863 as Centiprata, inspired by the Latin name Centum Prata.
- A nunnery given by the Alamannic noblewoman Beata on Lützelau Island is first mentioned, and is in this year sold to Einsiedeln Abbey.
- Ufenau island in Switzerland is first mentioned in 741 as "Hupinauia", and in 744 as "Ubinauvia" — island of Huppan of Huphan.

==== Britain ====
- Wat's Dyke, a 40 mile (64 km) earthwork in present-day Wales, is constructed. The border between Mercia and Powys is set here. The date that Wat's Dyke was constructed is very uncertain, with some estimates linking the construction of the dyke to the 5th century and others to the early 9th century (approximate date).

==== Arabian Empire ====
- April 17 – Caliph Al-Walid II is besieged in his castle outside the city of Damascus. He is defeated and killed by Arab forces under Sulayman ibn Hisham. Al-Walid is succeeded by his cousin Yazid III, who dies shortly after of a brain tumor.

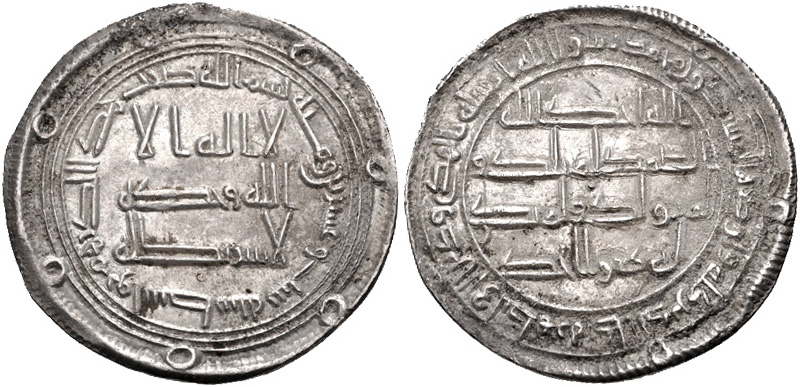
Dirham of caliph Ibrahim ibn al-Walid. He ruled the caliphate for just two months

- December – Marwan ibn Muhammad rebels against Yazid's designated successor Ibrahim ibn al-Walid, defeats the Umayyad forces under Sulayman ibn Hisham, and becomes caliph.

==== Africa ====
- Tunisian Coup: Following the death of the Umayyad caliph, Hisham, Abd al-Rahman ibn Habib assembles a small force in Tunis and declares himself emir of Ifriqiya. Handhala ibn Safwan al-Kalbi, wali of Ifriqiya decides against fighting and returns to Damascus. Abd al-Rahman installs himself in Kairouan, and crushes multiple revolts around the country.

==== Asia ====
- Turkic subjects like Uyghur, Karluk and Basmyl, who are not the members of the Ashina clan, stage a coup. This ends the Turkic Empire and Ashina clan (except in Khazaria).
- Autumn – Li Bai (also Li Po), Chinese poet and skilled calligrapher, meets Du Fu for the first time.
- The Japanese imperial capital is moved from Kuni-kyō to Heijō-kyō.

==== Central America ====
- February 4 – In the Third Tikal-Calakmul War in what is now Guatemala, the Mayan city-state of Tikal conquers the state of Naranjo and captures its king, Yax Mayuy Chan Chaak, who is subsequently sacrificed. The conquest by Tikal destroys Calakmul's once powerful and extensive network of allies, vassal states and trade networks.

=== By topic ===
==== Religion ====
- Synod of Soissons. Called at the instigation of Pepin the Short and Boniface, archbishop and metropolitan, it secures the condemnation of the Frankish bishop Adalbert.
- Sturm, disciple of Boniface, establishes the Benedictine Abbey of Fulda (Hesse), as part of Boniface's mission to bring Christianity to the pagan tribes in Germany (or 742).
- June – Pope Zachary gives his approval by sending Abel, Grimo and Hartbert their palliums for the metropolitan sees of Reims, Rouen and Sens.
- Salih ibn Tarif proclaims himself a prophet among the Barghawata, a confederation of Berber tribes in modern-day western Morocco.

=== By place ===
==== Byzantine Empire ====
- Bubonic plague in Asia Minor kills 1/3 of the population, and subsequently sweeps through the Peloponnese (Balkan Peninsula) (approximate date).

==== Europe ====
- Hunald I, duke of Aquitaine, retires to a monastery, probably on Île de Ré. He is succeeded by his son Waifar, who struggles during his rule for independence against the Frankish Kingdom.
- Carantania (modern Austria) loses its independence and becomes part of the Frankish Kingdom, due to the pressing danger posed by Avar tribes from the east (approximate date).

==== Asia ====
- China has accomplishments in poetry, painting and printing, but its monarchical system tends toward failure. Emperor Xuan Zong has fallen under the spell of his son's wife Yang Guifei (one of the Four Beauties of Ancient China), a Taoist priestess. He is ignoring the economy and the Tang dynasty is declining.
- The newly founded Uyghur Empire controls most of the former Turkic Empire territory, creating an empire that extends from Lake Balkash (modern Kazakhstan) to Lake Baikal (Mongolia), and is subject to Chinese suzerainty (approximate date).

=== By topic ===
==== Religion ====
- Genbō, Japanese scholar-monk, is exiled to Dazaifu on the island of Kyushu.

=== By place ===
==== Byzantine Empire ====
- Arab–Byzantine Wars: Taking advantage of discontent among the Muslim Arabs, Emperor Constantine V invades Syria, and captures Germanikeia (modern Turkey). He organises the resettlement of part of the local Christian population in Thrace.
- Arab–Byzantine Wars – Battle of Keramaia: The Byzantine navy scores a crushing victory over the Umayyad Egyptian fleet.

==== Europe ====
- Council of Cannstatt: Carloman, mayor of the palace of Austrasia, convenes an assembly of the Alemanni nobility at Cannstatt (modern Stuttgart), and has most of the magnates, numbering in the thousands, arrested and executed for high treason. This ends the independence of the tribal duchy of Alamannia, which is thereafter governed by counts or dukes appointed by their Frankish overlords.
- King Ratchis codifies the Lombard laws, promulgated in Latin, and advised by his council and the Lombard army (approximate date).

==== Britain ====
- King Saelred of Essex dies after a 37-year reign. He is succeeded by Swithred, grandson of the late king Sigeheard. Like his predecessors, he is not an independent ruler, but a sub-king of Mercia.

==== Umayyad Caliphate ====
- August or September – Battle of Kafartuta: Caliph Marwan II defeats and kills Al-Dahhak ibn Qays al-Shaybani, leader of the Kharijites, in Upper Mesopotamia. The rebels withdraw across the River Tigris, escaping destruction.

==== Asia ====
- The Hida-Kokubunji Temple in Japan is built to pray for peace and prosperity (approximate date).
- Jayshikhari Chavda establishes the Chavda dynasty in Gujarat (India).

==== Central America ====
- August 15 – K'ak' Yipiiy Chan Chaak is installed as the new ruler of the Mayan city state of Naranjo in Guatemala and reigns until his death in 748.

=== By topic ===
==== Religion ====
- Guru Rinpoche, Indian Buddhist, travels to Bhutan (eastern end of the Himalayas), to cure the king of Bumthang (approximate date).

=== By place ===
==== Byzantine Empire ====
- Arab–Byzantine War: Emperor Constantine V destroys the Arab fleet off Cyprus, with the aid of ships from the Italian city-states, breaking the naval power of the Umayyad Caliphate.

==== Europe ====
- August 15 – Carloman, mayor of the palace of Austrasia, renounces his position as majordomo, and withdraws from public life. He retires to a monastery near Rome, being tonsured by Pope Zachary, and leaves his brother Pepin the Short as sole ruler (de facto) of the Frankish Kingdom.
- Bubonic plague breaks out in Sicily, Calabria (Southern Italy), and Monemvasia (modern Greece).

==== Islamic Empire ====
- June 9 – Abbasid Revolution: Abu Muslim Khorasani, Persian military leader from Khorasan, begins an open revolt against Umayyad rule, which is carried out under the sign of the Black Standard. Close to 10,000 Muslims, primarily Khorasani Persians are under his command, when the hostilities officially begin in Merv (modern Turkmenistan).

==== Asia ====
- Chinese forces under Gao Xianzhi (a Korean in Tang employ) defeat the Arabs and Tibetans, by rapid military expeditions over the Pamir Mountains and Hindu Kush. About 72 local Indian and Sogdian kingdoms become Tang vassals. Over the next two years he establishes complete control in East Asia.
- Emperor Xuan Zong abolishes the death penalty in China, during the Tang dynasty (approximate date).
- Empress Kōmyō founds the Shin-Yakushi-ji Buddhist temple in Nara (Japan).

=== By place ===
==== Europe ====
- January 18 – Duke Odilo of Bavaria dies after a 12-year reign. Grifo, youngest son of Charles Martel, seeks to establish his own rule by seizing the duchy for himself, and abducts Odilo's infant son Tassilo III.
- In Rome, Pope Zachary closes down a slave market, where Venetian merchants had been selling Christian captives to the Muslims in North Africa.

==== Britain ====
- King Æthelbert II of Kent sends a message to Boniface, archbishop of Mainz, requesting two well-trained goshawks for hunting. He had earlier made a gift of two falcons and a goshawk to King Æthelbald of Mercia (approximate date).

==== Arabian Empire ====
- February 14 – Abbasid Revolution: The Hashimi rebels under Abu Muslim Khorasani take Merv, capital of the Umayyad province Khorasan (modern Iran), marking the consolidation of the Abbasid revolt. Qahtaba ibn Shabib al-Ta'i takes the cities Nishapur and Rey, defeating an Umayyad army (10,000 men) at Gorgan.
- December 9 – Nasr ibn Sayyar, Arab governor of Khorasan, dies after a 10-year administration in which he has fought vigorously against dissident tribes, Turgesh neighbors, and the Abbasids. Nasr had imposed poll taxes (jizya) on non-Muslims, and introduced a system of land taxation for Muslim Arabs.
- The city of Baalbek (modern Lebanon) is sacked with great slaughter.

==== Asia ====
- An earthquake strikes the Middle East from northern Egypt to northwestern Mesopotamia, destroying many remnants of Byzantine culture (approximate date).

=== By place ===
==== Europe ====
- King Ratchis of the Lombards besieges Perugia, but is convinced to lift the siege by Pope Zachary. His decision to lift the siege of Perugia undermines his authority among the Lombard nobility, and ultimately results in the nobility deposing him at a council in Milan. King Ratchis is forced to retire with his family to the monastery at Monte Cassino.
- June – Aistulf succeeds his brother, Ratchis, as king of the Lombards and marries Gisaltruda, sister of Anselm, Duke of Friuli.

==== Britain ====
- King Ælfwald of East Anglia dies after a 36-year reign. He is succeeded by Beonna, Æthelberht I and possibly Hun (relationship unknown). Beonna emerges as the dominant monarch.
- King Æthelbald of Mercia calls the Synod of Gumley, at the instigation of Boniface, bishop of Mainz, and issues a charter that releases the Catholic Church from all public burdens.

==== Egypt ====
- Ḥawthara ibn Suhayl takes the Coptic patriarch, Michael I, hostage to Rosetta, and threatenes to have him killed if the Egyptian rebels did not lay down their arms. The Egyptians attacked Rosetta and sacked it, massacring its Arab inhabitants. There was an offensive as far as Pelusium against an Umayyad army. In response, Marwān ordered the pillaging and razing of Egyptian villages and monasteries throughout the Delta. His campaign was a failure and in 750 he was overthrown in the Abbasid Revolution.

==== Arabian Empire ====
- Abbasid Revolution: Muslim forces under Qahtaba ibn Shabib al-Ta'i defeat a large Umayyad army (50,000 men) at Isfahan, and invade Iraq, taking the city of Kufa.
- Abdallah ibn Abd al-Malik, Umayyad prince, is executed by crucifixion on orders of the first Abbasid caliph, Abdullah ibn Muhammad, at Al-Hirah (or 750).
- October 28 – Abdullah ibn Muhammad is proclaimed caliph at Kufa by his supporters and adopts the title of al-Saffah (the "Slaughterer of Blood").

==== Central America ====
- February 18 – Kʼakʼ Yipyaj Chan Kʼawiil ("Smoke Squirrel") becomes the new ruler of the Mayan city state of Copán in Honduras upon the death of Kʼakʼ Tiliw Chan Yopaat, who had reigned since 738. K'ak' Yipyaj reigns until 763.

==== Japan ====
- August 19 – Emperor Shōmu abdicates the throne, after a 25-year reign that has been dominated by his wife (and aunt), Kōmyō, a commoner he married at age 16. He is succeeded by his daughter Kōken; Shōmu becomes the first retired emperor to become a Buddhist priest.

=== By topic ===
==== Catastrophe ====
- January 18 – Galilee earthquake: Palestine and eastern Transjordan are devastated by an earthquake. The cities of Tiberias, Beit She'an, Hippos and Pella are largely destroyed.

== Significant people ==
- Hisham
- Al-Walid II
- Yazid III
- Ibrahim ibn al-Walid
- Marwan II
- Sulayman ibn Hisham
- Yazid al-Afqam
- Maslama ibn Hisham
- Sa'id ibn Hisham
- Pope Zachary
- Leo III the Isaurian
- Constantine V

== Births ==
740

- Aurelius, king of Asturias (approximate date)
- Gao Ying, chancellor of the Tang dynasty (d. 811)
- Layman Pang, Chinese Chán (Zen) Buddhist (d. 808)
- Mashallah ibn Athari, Jewish-Arab astrologer (d. 815)
- Waldo of Reichenau, Frankish abbot (approximate date)
- Theoctista, politically influential Byzantine woman (d. 802)

741

- Amalberga of Temse, Lotharingian nun and saint (d. 772)
- Sugano no Mamichi, Japanese nobleman (d. 814)
- Tassilo III, duke of Bavaria (approximate date)

742

- Charlemagne, king and emperor of the Franks (approximate date)
- De Zong, emperor of the Tang dynasty (d. 805)
- Himiltrude, wife of Charlemagne (approximate date)
- Ibrahim al-Mawsili, musician and singer (d. 804)
- Liu Congyi, chancellor of the Tang dynasty (d. 785)
- Ludger, Frisian missionary (approximate date)
- Muhammad ibn Mansur al-Mahdi, Muslim caliph (or 745)
- Odo of Metz, Frankish architect (d. 814)

743

- ′Abd Allah ibn Wahb, Muslim jurist (d. 813)

744

- Muhammad ibn Mansur al-Mahdi, Muslim caliph (or 745)

745

- Idris I, emir and founder of the Idrisid dynasty (d. 791)
- Muhammad ibn Mansur al-Mahdi, Muslim caliph (or 744)
- Musa al-Kadhim, seventh Twelver Shī‘ah imām (d. 799)
- Wei Gao, general of the Tang dynasty (d. 805)
- Willehad, bishop of Bremen (approximate date)
- Yaoshan Weiyan, Chinese Buddhist monk (d. 827)
- Zhang Jianfeng, statesman of the Tang dynasty (d. 800)

746

- Gao Chongwen, general of the Tang dynasty (d. 809)
- Hui-kuo, Chinese Buddhist monk (d. 805)
- Kirtivarman II, ruler in the Chalukya dynasty (d. 753)
- Zhao Zongru, chancellor of the Tang dynasty (d. 832)
- Zheng Yuqing, chancellor of the Tang dynasty (d. 821)
- Brearley_746

747

- Benedict of Aniane, Frankish monk (approximate date)
- Charlemagne, king and emperor of the Franks (or 748)

748

- Al-Waqidi, Muslim historian and biographer (approximate date)
- Charlemagne, king and emperor of the Franks (or 747)

749

- Muhammad al-Shaybani, Muslim jurist (approximate date; d. 805)

== Deaths ==
740

- Abdallah al-Battal, Arab general
- Æthelburg, queen of Wessex
- Æthelheard, king of Wessex
- Æthelwold, bishop of Lindisfarne
- Acca, bishop of Hexham (or 742)
- Anna, Byzantine princess and empress, wife of Artabasdos
- Frithugyth, queen of Wessex
- Gregory, duke of Benevento
- Hilderic, duke of Spoleto
- Khalid ibn Abi Habib al-Fihri, Arab general
- Maysara al-Matghari, Berber rebel leader
- Meng Haoran, Chinese poet
- Rhain ap Cadwgan, king of Dyfed and Brycheiniog
- Uqba ibn al-Hajjaj, Arab governor
- Zayd ibn Ali, Arab imam and grandson of Husayn ibn Ali (b. 695)
- Zhang Jiuling, chancellor of the Tang dynasty (b. 673)

741

- February 10 or 11 - Lady Six Sky, Maya queen of Naranjo
- March 28 – Hatsusebe, Japanese princess
- June 18 – Leo III, emperor of the Byzantine Empire
- October 22 – Charles Martel, Frankish statesman and founder of the Carolingian dynasty
- November 28 – Gregory III, pope of the Catholic Church
- Habib ibn Abi Obeida al-Fihri, Arab general
- Hedan II, duke of Thuringia (approximate date)
- Kulthum ibn Iyad al-Qasi, Arab governor
- Theodoald, mayor of the palace of Austrasia

742

- Abd al-Malik ibn Katan al-Fihri, Arab governor
- Acca, bishop of Hexham (or 740)
- Áed Balb mac Indrechtaig, king of Connacht (Ireland)
- Balj ibn Bishr al-Qushayri, Arab general and governor
- Cathal mac Finguine, king of Munster (Ireland)
- Itzamnaaj B'alam II, ruler of Yaxchilan (b. 647)
- Liutfrid, duke of Alsace (approximate date)
- Niu Xianke, chancellor of the Tang dynasty (b. 675)
- Ōno no Azumabito, Japanese samurai and official
- Orso Ipato, doge of Venice
- Wang Zhihuan, Chinese poet (b. 688)

743

- February 6 – Hisham ibn Abd al-Malik, Muslim caliph (b. 691)
- Eucherius, Frankish bishop
- Godescalc, duke of Benevento
- Khalid al-Qasri, Syrian Arab governor
- Pei Yaoqing, chancellor of the Tang dynasty (b. 681)
- Rigobert, Frankish abbot and bishop
- Theudimer (also known as Tudmir), Visigothic count
- Wihtburh, Anglo-Saxon abbess

744

- April 17 – Al-Walid II, Muslim caliph (b. 706)
- September 25 – Yazid III, Muslim caliph (b. 701)
- He Zhizhang, Chinese poet
- Hildeprand, king of the Lombards
- Huoching, Alamannic nobleman
- Kül-chor, ruler (khagan) of the Turgesh
- Liutprand, king of the Lombards
- Özmiş Qaghan, ruler of the Second Turkic Khaganate
- Stephen IV, patriarch of Antioch

745

- Cathal Maenmaighe, king of Uí Maine (Ireland)
- Daniel, bishop of Winchester
- Herlindis of Maaseik, Frankish abbess (or 753)
- Ingwald, bishop of London
- Kadobe, Japanese prince
- Kulun Beg, ruler (khagan) of the Turkish Empire
- Thrasimund II, duke of Spoleto
- Wilfrid, bishop of York
- Yusuf ibn Umar al-Thaqafi, Muslim governor

746

- Al-Dahhak ibn Qays al-Shaybani, leader of the Kharijites
- Floribert, bishop of Liège
- Genbō, Japanese scholar-monk
- Maelimarchair, bishop of Aughrim (Ireland)
- Saelred, king of Essex

747

- May 16 – Petronax, Italian monk and abbot (b. 675)
- August 13 – Wigbert, Anglo-Saxon monk
- October 26 – Witta of Büraburg, Anglo-Saxon missionary

Date Unknown

- Cú Chuimne, Irish monk
- Dunn, bishop of Rochester
- Fiachna ua Maicniadh, Irish abbot
- Li Shizhi, chancellor and poet of the Tang dynasty
- Sulayman ibn Hisham, Arab general

748

- January 18 – Odilo, duke of Bavaria
- May 22 – Genshō, empress of Japan (b. 683)
- December 9 – Nasr ibn Sayyar, Arab general (b. 663)
- Cellan of Clonfert, Irish abbot
- Eadbert I, king of Kent (approximate date)
- Indrechtach mac Dungalaig, king of Brega (Ireland)
- Wasil ibn Ata, Muslim theologian and jurist (b. 700)

749

- August 27 – Qahtaba ibn Shabib al-Ta'i, Muslim general
- December 4 – John of Damascus, Syrian monk and priest
- Ælfwald, king of East Anglia
- Abdallah ibn Abd al-Malik, Umayyad prince (or 750)
- Ailello hui Daimine, king of Uí Maine (Ireland)
- Gyōki, Japanese Buddhist priest (b. 668)
