= 749 =

Calendar year

749 in various calendars
- Gregorian calendar: 749; DCCXLIX
- Ab urbe condita: 1502
- Armenian calendar: 198; ԹՎ ՃՂԸ
- Assyrian calendar: 5499
- Balinese saka calendar: 670–671
- Bengali calendar: 155–156
- Berber calendar: 1699
- Buddhist calendar: 1293
- Burmese calendar: 111
- Byzantine calendar: 6257–6258
- Chinese calendar: 戊子年 (Earth Rat); 3446 or 3239 — to — 己丑年 (Earth Ox); 3447 or 3240
- Coptic calendar: 465–466
- Discordian calendar: 1915
- Ethiopian calendar: 741–742
- Hebrew calendar: 4509–4510
- Hindu calendars
- Vikram Samvat: 805–806
- Shaka Samvat: 670–671
- Kali Yuga: 3849–3850
- Holocene calendar: 10749
- Iranian calendar: 127–128
- Islamic calendar: 131–132
- Japanese calendar: Tenpyō 21 / Tenpyō-kanpō 1 (天平感宝元年)
- Javanese calendar: 643–644
- Julian calendar: 749; DCCXLIX
- Korean calendar: 3082
- Minguo calendar: 1163 before ROC 民前1163年
- Nanakshahi calendar: −719
- Seleucid era: 1060/1061 AG
- Thai solar calendar: 1291–1292
- Tibetan calendar: ས་ཕོ་བྱི་བ་ལོ་ (male Earth-Rat); 875 or 494 or −278 — to — ས་མོ་གླང་ལོ་ (female Earth-Ox); 876 or 495 or −277

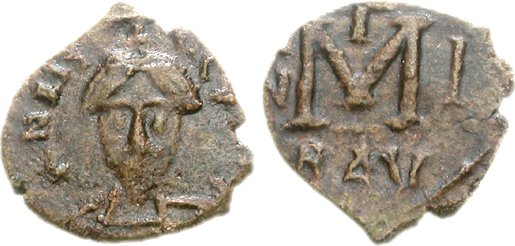
King Aistulf of the Lombards

Year 749 (DCCXLIX) was a common year starting on Wednesday of the Julian calendar, the 749th year of the Common Era (CE) and Anno Domini (AD) designations, the 749th year of the 1st millennium, the 49th year of the 8th century, and the 10th and last year of the 740s decade.The denomination 749 for this year has been used since the early medieval period, when the Anno Domini calendar era became the prevalent method in Europe for naming years.

== Events ==
=== By place ===
==== Europe ====
- King Ratchis of the Lombards besieges Perugia, but is convinced to lift the siege by Pope Zachary. His decision to lift the siege of Perugia undermines his authority among the Lombard nobility, and ultimately results in the nobility deposing him at a council in Milan. King Ratchis is forced to retire with his family to the monastery at Monte Cassino.
- June – Aistulf succeeds his brother, Ratchis, as king of the Lombards and marries Gisaltruda, sister of Anselm, Duke of Friuli.

==== Britain ====
- King Ælfwald of East Anglia dies after a 36-year reign. He is succeeded by Beonna, Æthelberht I and possibly Hun (relationship unknown). Beonna emerges as the dominant monarch.
- King Æthelbald of Mercia calls the Synod of Gumley, at the instigation of Boniface, bishop of Mainz, and issues a charter that releases the Catholic Church from all public burdens.

==== Egypt ====
- Ḥawthara ibn Suhayl takes the Coptic patriarch, Michael I, hostage to Rosetta, and threatenes to have him killed if the Egyptian rebels did not lay down their arms. The Egyptians attacked Rosetta and sacked it, massacring its Arab inhabitants. There was an offensive as far as Pelusium against an Umayyad army. In response, Marwān ordered the pillaging and razing of Egyptian villages and monasteries throughout the Delta. His campaign was a failure and in 750 he was overthrown in the Abbasid Revolution.

==== Arabian Empire ====
- Abbasid Revolution: Muslim forces under Qahtaba ibn Shabib al-Ta'i defeat a large Umayyad army (50,000 men) at Isfahan, and invade Iraq, taking the city of Kufa.
- Abdallah ibn Abd al-Malik, Umayyad prince, is executed by crucifixion on orders of the first Abbasid caliph, Abdullah ibn Muhammad, at Al-Hirah (or 750).
- October 28 – Abdullah ibn Muhammad is proclaimed caliph at Kufa by his supporters and adopts the title of al-Saffah (the "Slaughterer of Blood").

==== Central America ====
- February 18 – Kʼakʼ Yipyaj Chan Kʼawiil ("Smoke Squirrel") becomes the new ruler of the Mayan city state of Copán in Honduras upon the death of Kʼakʼ Tiliw Chan Yopaat, who had reigned since 738. K'ak' Yipyaj reigns until 763.

==== Japan ====
- August 19 – Emperor Shōmu abdicates the throne, after a 25-year reign that has been dominated by his wife (and aunt), Kōmyō, a commoner he married at age 16. He is succeeded by his daughter Kōken; Shōmu becomes the first retired emperor to become a Buddhist priest.

=== By topic ===
==== Catastrophe ====
- January 18 – Galilee earthquake: Palestine and eastern Transjordan are devastated by an earthquake. The cities of Tiberias, Beit She'an, Hippos and Pella are largely destroyed. The Church of Maria on Temple hill in Jerusalem is destroyed.

== Births ==
- Muhammad al-Shaybani, Muslim jurist (approximate date; d. 805)

== Deaths ==
- August 27 – Qahtaba ibn Shabib al-Ta'i, Muslim general
- December 4 – John of Damascus, Syrian monk and priest
- Ælfwald, king of East Anglia
- Abdallah ibn Abd al-Malik, Umayyad prince (or 750)
- Ailello hui Daimine, king of Uí Maine (Ireland)
- Gyōki, Japanese Buddhist priest (b. 668)

== Sources ==
- Gabra, Gawdat (2003). "The Revolts of the Bashmuric Copts in the Eighth and Ninth Centuries". In W. Beltz (ed.). Die koptische Kirche in den ersten drei islamischen Jahrhunderten. Institut für Orientalistik, Martin-Luther-Universität. pp. 111–119. Archived from the original on March 22, 2020.
- Megally, Mounir (1991). "Bashmuric Revolts". In Aziz Suryal Atiya (ed.). The Coptic Encyclopedia. Vol. 2. New York: Macmillan Publishers. cols. 349b–351b.
