= 745 =

Calendar year

745 in various calendars
- Gregorian calendar: 745; DCCXLV
- Ab urbe condita: 1498
- Armenian calendar: 194; ԹՎ ՃՂԴ
- Assyrian calendar: 5495
- Balinese saka calendar: 666–667
- Bengali calendar: 151–152
- Berber calendar: 1695
- Buddhist calendar: 1289
- Burmese calendar: 107
- Byzantine calendar: 6253–6254
- Chinese calendar: 甲申年 (Wood Monkey); 3442 or 3235 — to — 乙酉年 (Wood Rooster); 3443 or 3236
- Coptic calendar: 461–462
- Discordian calendar: 1911
- Ethiopian calendar: 737–738
- Hebrew calendar: 4505–4506
- Hindu calendars
- Vikram Samvat: 801–802
- Shaka Samvat: 666–667
- Kali Yuga: 3845–3846
- Holocene calendar: 10745
- Iranian calendar: 123–124
- Islamic calendar: 127–128
- Japanese calendar: Tenpyō 17 (天平１７年)
- Javanese calendar: 639–640
- Julian calendar: 745; DCCXLV
- Korean calendar: 3078
- Minguo calendar: 1167 before ROC 民前1167年
- Nanakshahi calendar: −723
- Seleucid era: 1056/1057 AG
- Thai solar calendar: 1287–1288
- Tibetan calendar: ཤིང་ཕོ་སྤྲེ་ལོ་ (male Wood-Monkey); 871 or 490 or −282 — to — ཤིང་མོ་བྱ་ལོ་ (female Wood-Bird); 872 or 491 or −281

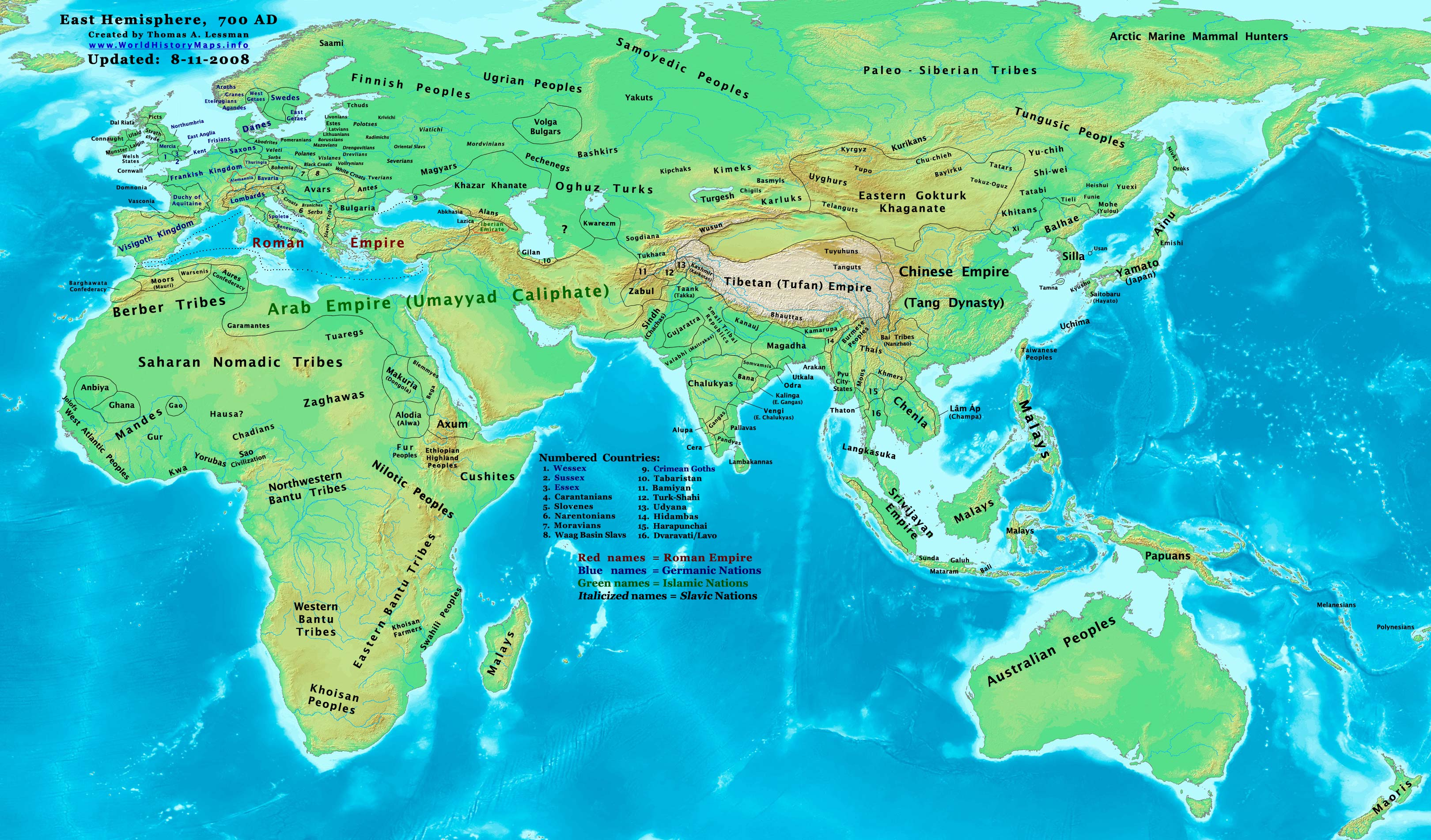
Map of the Turkish Empire (8th century)

Year 745 (DCCXLV) was a common year starting on Friday of the Julian calendar. The denomination 745 for this year has been used since the early medieval period, when the Anno Domini calendar era became the prevalent method in Europe for naming years.

== Events ==
=== By place ===
==== Byzantine Empire ====
- Bubonic plague in Asia Minor kills 1/3 of the population, and subsequently sweeps through the Peloponnese (Balkan Peninsula) (approximate date).

==== Europe ====
- Hunald I, duke of Aquitaine, retires to a monastery, probably on Île de Ré. He is succeeded by his son Waifar, who struggles during his rule for independence against the Frankish Kingdom.
- Carantania (modern Austria) loses its independence and becomes part of the Frankish Kingdom, due to the pressing danger posed by Avar tribes from the east (approximate date).

==== Asia ====
- China has accomplishments in poetry, painting and printing, but its monarchical system tends toward failure. Emperor Xuan Zong has fallen under the spell of his son's wife Yang Guifei (one of the Four Beauties of Ancient China), a Taoist priestess. He is ignoring the economy and the Tang dynasty is declining.
- The newly founded Uyghur Empire controls most of the former Turkic Empire territory, creating an empire that extends from Lake Balkash (modern Kazakhstan) to Lake Baikal (Mongolia), and is subject to Chinese suzerainty (approximate date).

=== By topic ===
==== Religion ====
- Genbō, Japanese scholar-monk, is exiled to Dazaifu on the island of Kyushu.

== Births ==
- Idris I, emir and founder of the Idrisid dynasty (d. 791)
- Muhammad ibn Mansur al-Mahdi, Muslim caliph (or 744)
- Musa al-Kadhim, seventh Twelver Shī‘ah imām (d. 799)
- Wei Gao, general of the Tang dynasty (d. 805)
- Willehad, bishop of Bremen (approximate date)
- Yaoshan Weiyan, Chinese Buddhist monk (d. 827)
- Zhang Jianfeng, statesman of the Tang dynasty (d. 800)

== Deaths ==
- Cathal Maenmaighe, king of Uí Maine (Ireland)
- Daniel, bishop of Winchester
- Herlindis of Maaseik, Frankish abbess (or 753)
- Ingwald, bishop of London
- Kadobe, Japanese prince
- Kulun Beg, ruler (khagan) of the Turkish Empire
- Thrasimund II, duke of Spoleto
- Wilfrid, bishop of York
- Yusuf ibn Umar al-Thaqafi, Muslim governor
