= 8th century =

One hundred years, from 701 to 800

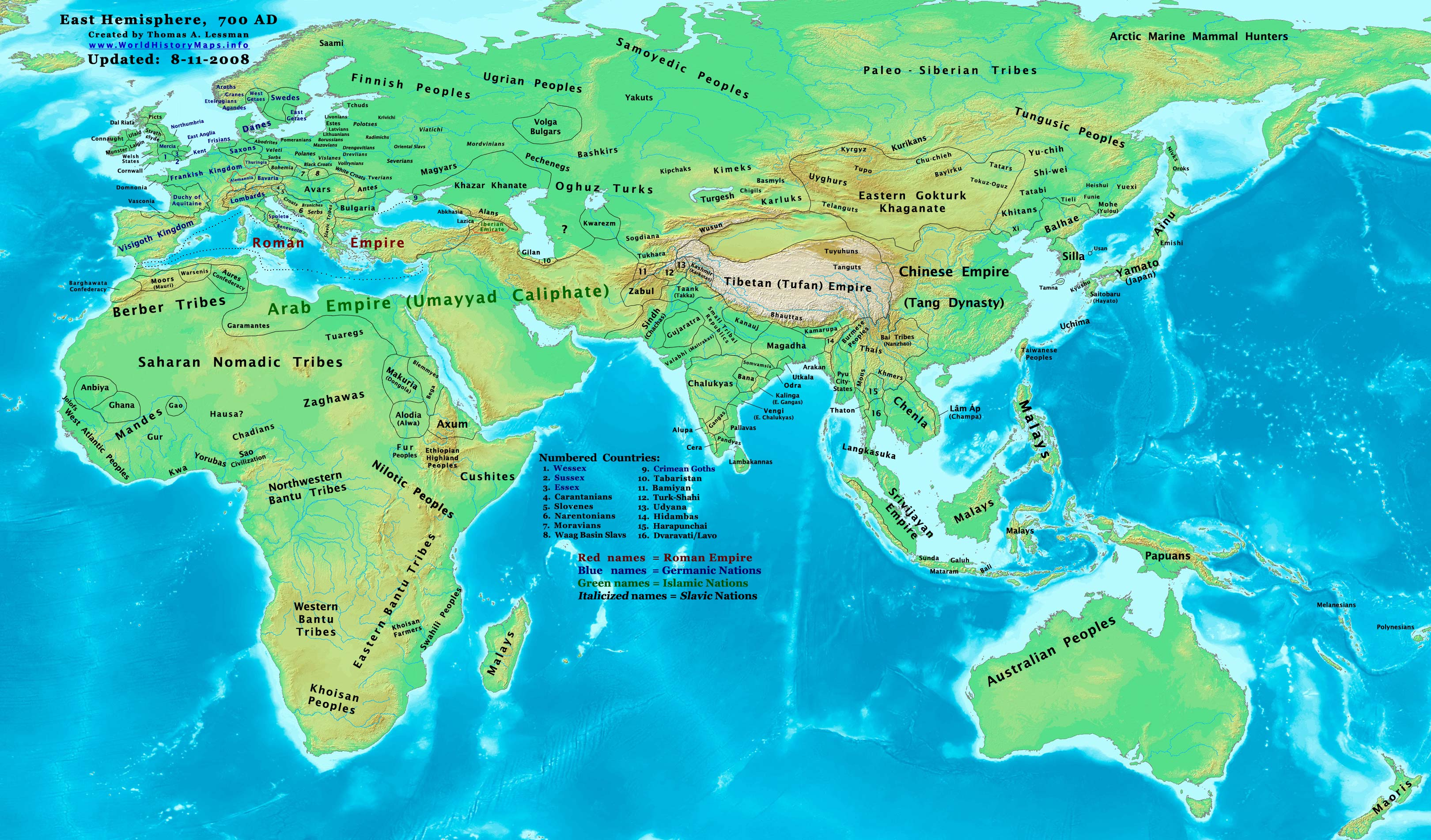
Eastern Hemisphere at the beginning of the 8th century

The 8th century is the period from 701 (represented by the Roman numerals DCCI) through 800 (DCCC) in accordance with the Julian Calendar.

In the historiography of Europe the phrase the long 8th century is sometimes used to refer to the period of circa AD 660–820.

The coast of North Africa and the Iberian Peninsula quickly came under Islamic Arab domination. The westward expansion of the Umayyad Empire was famously stopped at the siege of Constantinople by the Byzantine Empire and the Battle of Tours by the Franks. The tide of Arab conquest came to an end in the middle of the 8th century.

In Europe, late in the century, the Vikings, seafaring peoples from Scandinavia, begin raiding the coasts of Europe and the Mediterranean, and go on to found several important kingdoms.

In Asia, the Pala Empire is founded in Bengal. The Tang dynasty reaches its pinnacle under Chinese Emperor Xuanzong. The Nara period begins in Japan.

== Events ==
- Estimated century in which the poem Beowulf is composed.
- Classical Maya civilization begins to decline.
- The Kombumerri burial grounds are founded.
- The first Serbian state is formed at the beginning of the century.
- The Buddhist Jataka tales were translated by an Persian translator—from Persian into Syriac and Arabic—under the title “Kalilag and Damnag”.
- An account of Buddha's life is translated into Greek by Saint John of Damascus, and widely circulated to Christians as the story of Barlaam and Josaphat.
- Height of the Classic period in pre-Columbian Maya civilization history.
- Śāntideva, a Buddhist monk at Nalanda Monastery in India, composes the famous Bodhicharyāvatāra, or Guide to the Bodhisattva's Way of Life.
- The height of the Giant Wild Goose Pagoda in Xi'an, China is extended by 5 stories.
- 701: The Taihō Code is enacted in late Asuka period Japan.
- 705: Death of Arab caliph Abd al-Malik, his succession by his nominated heir and elder son al-Walid.
- 705: Overthrow of Empress Wu Zetian, the reign of China's first and only sole-ruling empress ends.
- 705: Justinian II is forced to give the title Caesar of Byzantium to the Bulgarian Emperor Tervel. The Byzantine Empire begins to pay annual tributes to Bulgaria.
- 708–711: The Bulgarians defeat Justinian II at the Battle of Anchialus. An Arab Umayyad army under Muhammad ibn al-Qasim invades Sindh in northern India.
- 710: Empress Genmei moves the capital to Heijō-kyū (present day Nara), initiating the Nara period of Japan.
- 711: Palenque is conquered by Toniná.

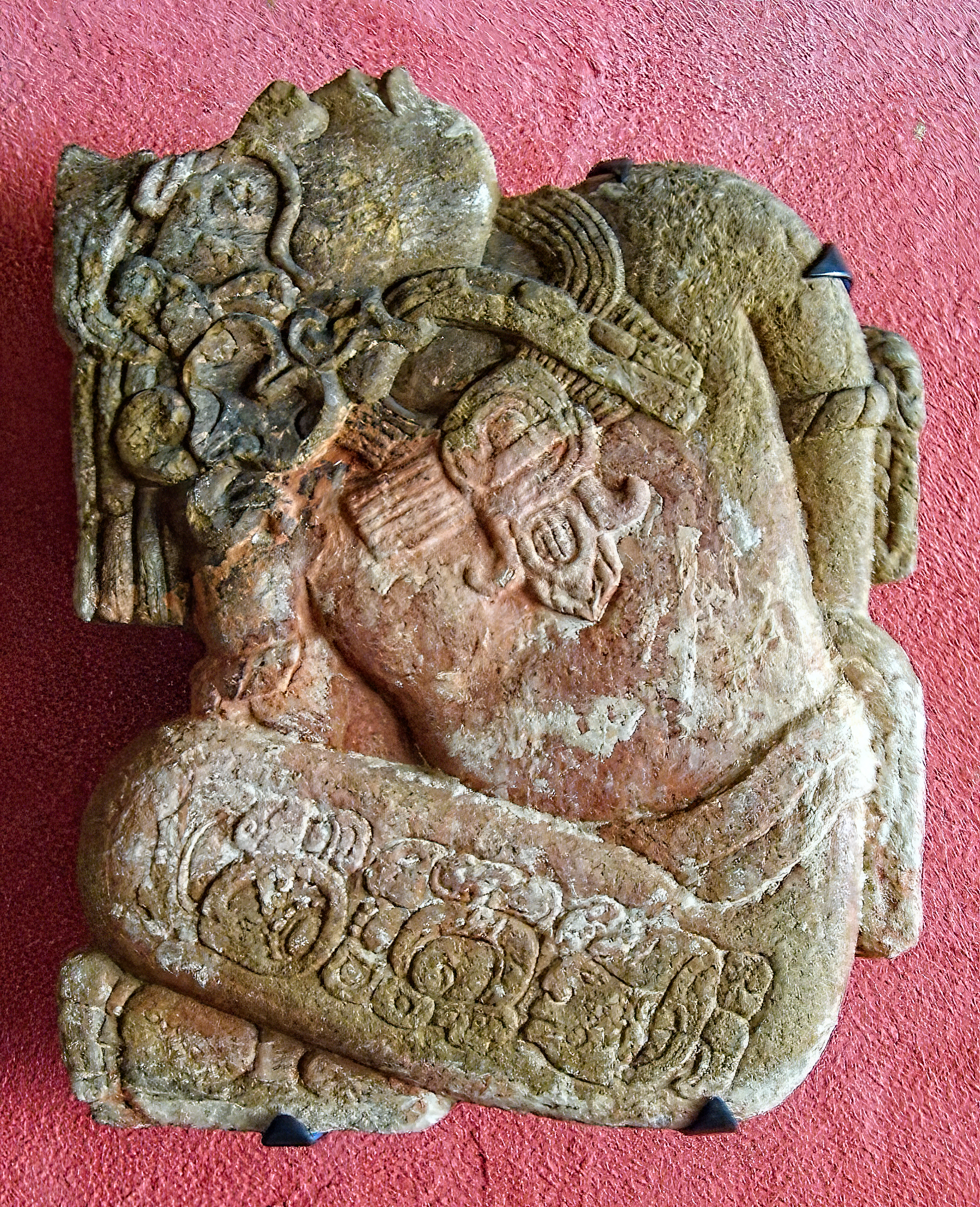
A prisoner from Palenque in Toniná

- 711: Tariq ibn Ziyad crosses the Straits of Gibraltar. With the creation of Al-Andalus, most of the Iberian Peninsula is conquered by Arab and Berber Muslims, thus ending the Visigothic rule, and beginning almost eight centuries of Muslim rule.
- 712: Liutprand, King of the Lombards begins his reign (until 744).
- c. 712: Metropolitan episcopal see is established by the Church of the East in Chinese capital of Chang'an.
- 712–756: Emperor Xuanzong reigned, the time was considered one of China's high points.
- 712–776: Caliphate campaigns in India Arab Expansions halted.
- 713: Death of Dajian Huineng, sixth and last Patriarch of Chán Buddhism.
- 713: Treaty of Tudmir, signed between Abd al-'Aziz, the commander of Muslim troops invading Spain, and Theodemir, the Christian king of a southern region in Spain.
- 715: Death of al-Walid I and he was succeeded by his brother Sulayman ibn Abd al-Malik.
- 716: Sanjaya ascends the throne to be the first king of the Mataram kingdom.
- 717: Death of caliph Sulayman ibn Abd al-Malik and his succession by his cousin and nominated heir Umar ibn Abd al-Aziz.
- 717–718: Siege of Constantinople. The Bulgarians and the Byzantines decisively defeat the invading Arabs, thus halting the Arab advance toward Europe.
- 718: Sri Indravarman King of Srivijaya send a letter to the Caliph Umar bin Abdul Aziz of the Umayyad Caliphate in Damascus, signing early ancient Indonesian official contact with Islamic world in the Middle East.
- 720: Death of caliph Umar ibn Abd al-Aziz and succession of his cousin Yazid II on 4 February 720.
- 720: The uprising of the Egyptians against the Umayyad Arab rule in Egypt, which led to the beginning of the Bashmurian revolts that lasted 112 years.
- 724: Death of caliph Yazid II and he was succeeded by his brother and nominated heir Hisham.
- 726: Byzantine Emperor Leo III the Isaurian destroys the icon of Christ above the Chalke Gate in the capital city of Constantinople, beginning the first phase of the Byzantine Iconoclasm.
- 731: Bede completes his Historia ecclesiastica gentis Anglorum (Ecclesiastical History of the English People).
- 732: Battle of Tours. Near Poitiers, France, leader of the Franks Charles Martel and his men defeat a large army of Moors under the governor of Cordoba, Abdul Rahman Al Ghafiqi, who is killed during the battle. The Battle of Tours halts the advance of Islam into Western Europe and establishes a balance of power between Western Europe, Islam and the Byzantine Empire.
- 732: The Sanjaya dynasty is founded around this time according to the Canggal inscription.

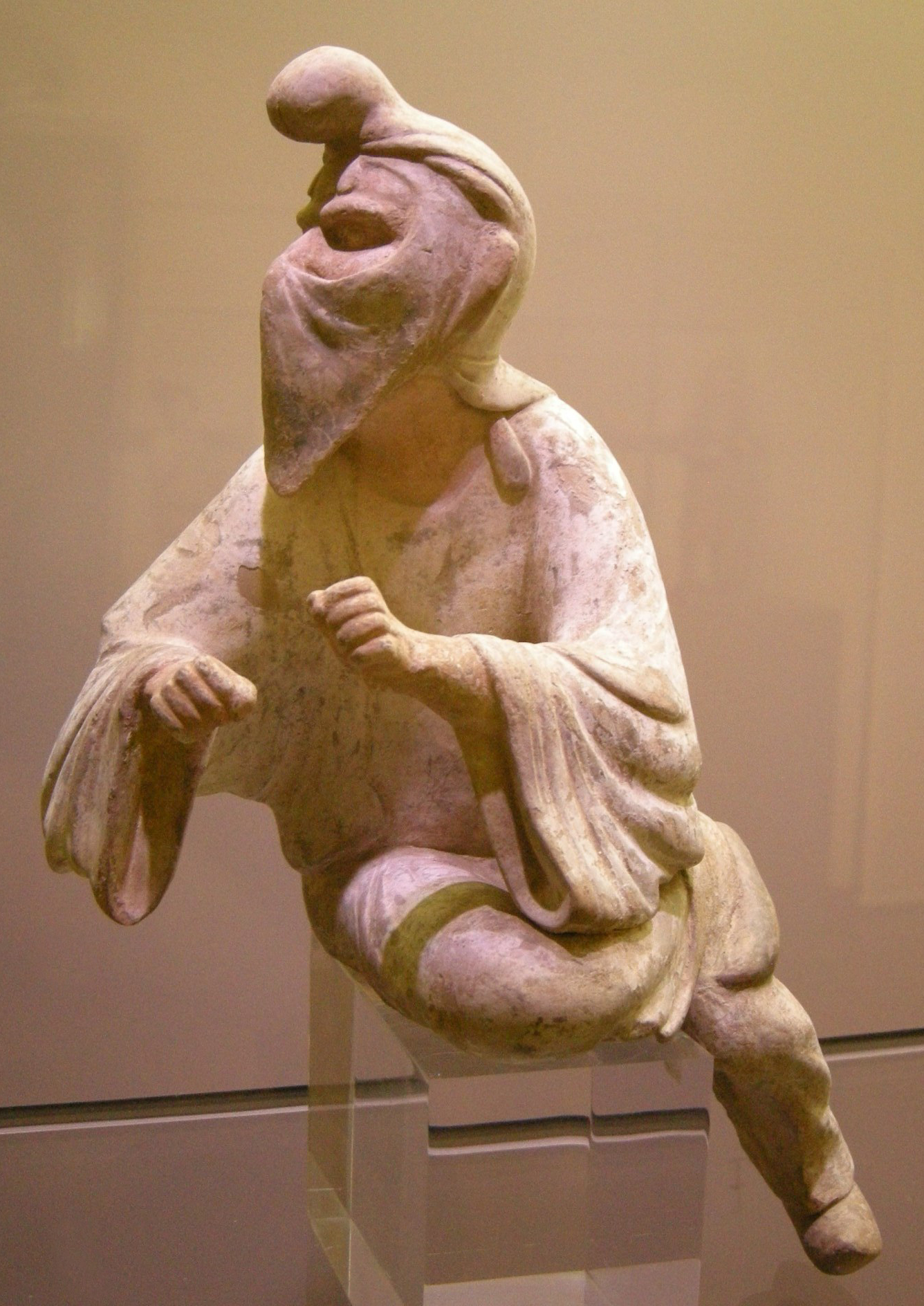
An 8th-century Tang dynasty Chinese clay figurine of a Sogdian man (an Eastern Iranian person) wearing a distinctive cap and face veil, possibly a camel rider or even a Zoroastrian priest engaging in a ritual at a fire temple, since face veils were used to avoid contaminating the holy fire with breath or saliva; Museum of Oriental Art (Turin), Italy.

- 738: Quiriguá declares independence from Copan
- 740: Battle of Akroinon. Byzantines win their first large-scale victory in a pitched battle against the Arabs.
- 742: For the municipal census of the Tang-dynasty Chinese capital city Chang'an and its metropolitan area of Jingzhou Fu (including small towns in the vicinity), the New Book of Tang records that in this year there were 362,921 registered families with 1,960,188 persons.
- 743: Death of Arab caliph Hisham and succession of his nephew and heir Al-Walid II.
- 744: Assassination of Al-Walid II, Succession of Yazid III to the Caliphal throne on 17 April 744.
- 744: Death of Yazid III and his succession by his brother and nominated heir Ibrahim ibn al-Walid. On 4 December Ibrahim was forced to Abdicate in favour Marwan II.
- 748: The Chinese Buddhist monk Jian Zhen writes in his Yue Jue Shu of the international sea traffic coming to Guangzhou, ships from Borneo, Persia, Sri Lanka, Indonesia, and others bringing tons of goods.
- 750: The last Umayyad Caliph Marwan II (744–750) is overthrown and executed by the first Abbasid Caliph, Abu al-Abbas al-Saffah. The Caliphate is moved to Baghdad which would later develop into a centre of trade and culture. The Ghana Empire begins in western Africa.
- mid-8th century - Great Wild Goose Pagoda at Ci'en Temple, Xi'an, Shanxi, is rebuilt.
- c. mid-8th century - Camel Carrying a Group of Musicians, from a tomb near Xi'an, Shanxi, is made. Tang dynasty. It is now kept at Museum of Chinese History, Beijing.
- 751: Arabian armies defeat Chinese Tang dynasty troops in the Battle of Talas, in the high Pamirs near Samarkand, and conquer Central Asia completely.
- 752: The Hindu Mataram kingdom flourishes and declines. (to 1045)
- 754: Death of Abbasid caliph al-Saffah and ascension of caliph al-Mansur to Arab Caliphate.
- 755–763: The An Shi Rebellion devastates China during the mid Tang dynasty.
- 757: King Offa of Mercia becomes dominant ruler in England.
- 758: Arab pirates burn and loot the Chinese city of Guangzhou, while the Tang Dynasty authorities shut the port down for the next five decades.
- 760: The construction of the famous Indonesian Buddhist structure Borobudur began, probably as a non-Buddhist shrine.
- 761: Marriage of Abbasid princess Raytah and Muhammad (future al-Mahdi).
- 768: Pepin dies; Charles becomes king at Noyan and his brother Carloman becomes king at Soissons.
- 770's–780's: Java launched series of naval raids on ports of Dai Viet, Champa and Cambodia; Sontay in Tonkin (767); Nha Trang (774); captured Indrapura in Cambodia (770); Phan Rang (787). The naval raids was probably launched by Sailendran-Srivijayan Maharaja Dharmasetu or Dharanindra.
- 772–804: Charlemagne invades what is now northwestern Germany, battling the Saxons for more than thirty years and finally crushing their rebellion, incorporating Saxony into the Frankish Empire and the Christian world.
- 775: Death of caliph al-Mansur and he was succeeded by al-Mahdi.

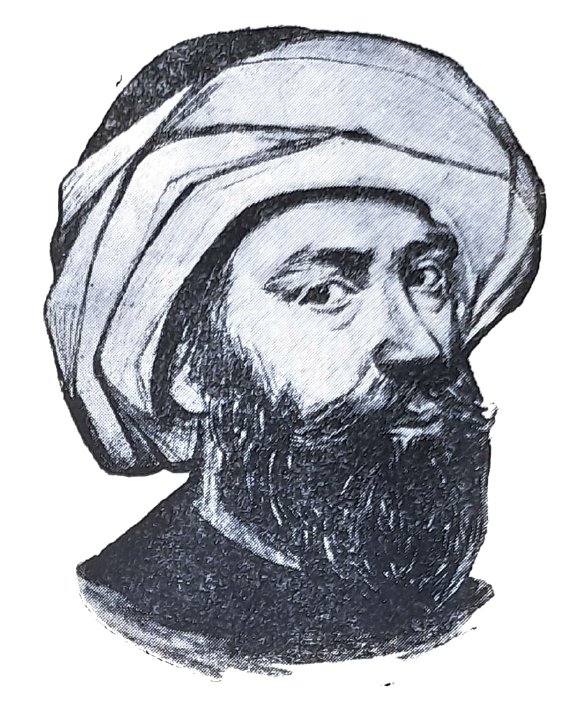
Abbasid caliph al-Mansur was succeeded by his heir and son Al-Mahdi, on 6th October 775.

- 778: Kalasan temple constructed, according to the Kalasan inscription.
- 781: Marriage of Abbasid princess Zubaidah and Harun al-Rashid. The Xi'an Stele is erected in China.
- 782: Buddhist monk Prajna reaches Chang'an and translates the sutras into Chinese.
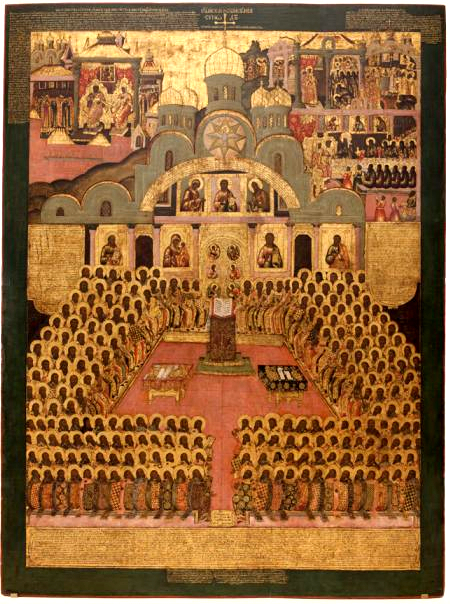
  The Second Council of Nicaea was set up to restore the use and veneration of icons (or holy images), which had previously been suppressed
- 785: Death of Abbasid caliph al-Mahdi and succession of al-Hadi on 24 July 785. The Tang dynasty begins landing regular maritime missions on the coast of East Africa, cutting out middlemen Arab sea merchants.
- 785–805: Chinese geographer Jia Dan describes large lighthouse pillars built in the Persian Gulf, which is confirmed a century later by al-Mas'udi and al-Muqaddasi.
- 787: The Empress Irene of Athens convenes the Seventh Ecumenical Council, ending the first phase of Byzantine Iconoclasm.
- 786: Death of Abbasid caliph al-Hadi and ascension of caliph Harun al-Rashid.
- 792: Battle of Marcelae. The Bulgarian victory over the Byzantines marks the end of the half-century political instability in Bulgaria.
- 792: The Manjusrigrha (Sewu) temple is completed according to Manjusrigrha inscription.
- 793: The first written account of a Viking raid carried out on the abbey of Lindisfarne in northern England.
- 793: The Frisian–Frankish wars come to an end with the last uprising of the Frisians.
- 794: Emperor Kanmu moves the capital to Heian-kyō (present day Kyoto), initiating the Heian period of Japan.
- 800: An Arab fleet sails up the Tiber.
- 800–909: Rule of Aghlabids as an autonomous province of Caliphate in North Africa, with their capital at Tunis.
- 800: Beginning of the ancient West African state of Takrur or Tekrour, which flourished roughly parallel to the Ghana Empire.
- 800: On Christmas Day, Charlemagne is crowned the first Holy Roman Emperor by Pope Leo III.
- 800: The agriculturally based Buddhist Sailendra kingdom flourishes and declines. (to 832)

== Inventions, discoveries, introductions ==
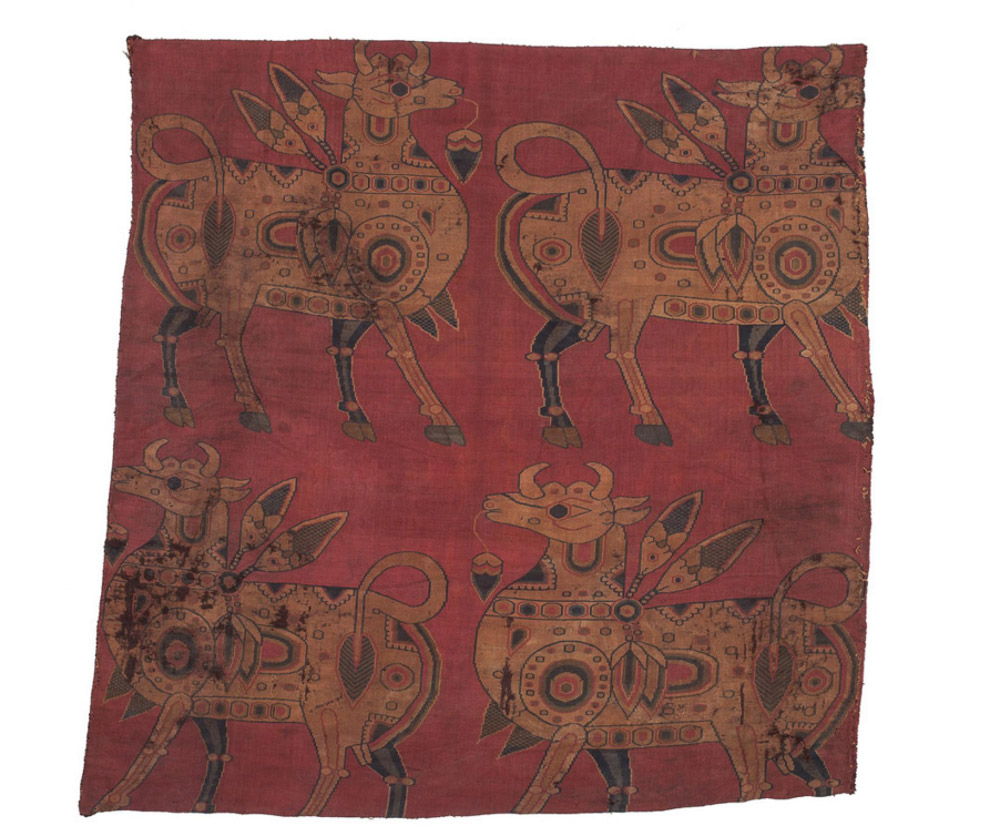
8th century silk fragment, central Asia

- Heavy plow in use in the Rhine valley.
- Horse collar in use in Northern Europe in 8th or 9th century — perhaps introduced from Asia.
- Mid 8th century – papermaking introduced from China to Arabs.
- Iron horseshoes came into common use around 770.
- Pattadakal, Chalukya architecture.
- The Chinese Buddhist monk Yi Xing applies a clockwork escapement mechanism to operate and rotate his astronomical celestial globe.
- The first European triangular harp designed by the Picts of Scotland.

== Sources ==
- Brooks, E. W. (1913). "The Relations Between the Empire and Egypt from a New Arabic Source". Byzantinische Zeitschrift. 22 (2): 381–391. doi:10.1515/byzs.1913.22.2.381. S2CID 191661543.
- Gabra, Gawdat (2003). "The Revolts of the Bashmuric Copts in the Eighth and Ninth Centuries". In W. Beltz (ed.). Die koptische Kirche in den ersten drei islamischen Jahrhunderten. Institut für Orientalistik, Martin-Luther-Universität. pp. 111–119. Archived from the original on 22 March 2020.
- Megally, Mounir (1991). "Bashmuric Revolts". In Aziz Suryal Atiya (ed.). The Coptic Encyclopedia. Vol. 2. New York: Macmillan Publishers. cols. 349b–351b.
