= Sharik ibn Shaikh's Rebellion =

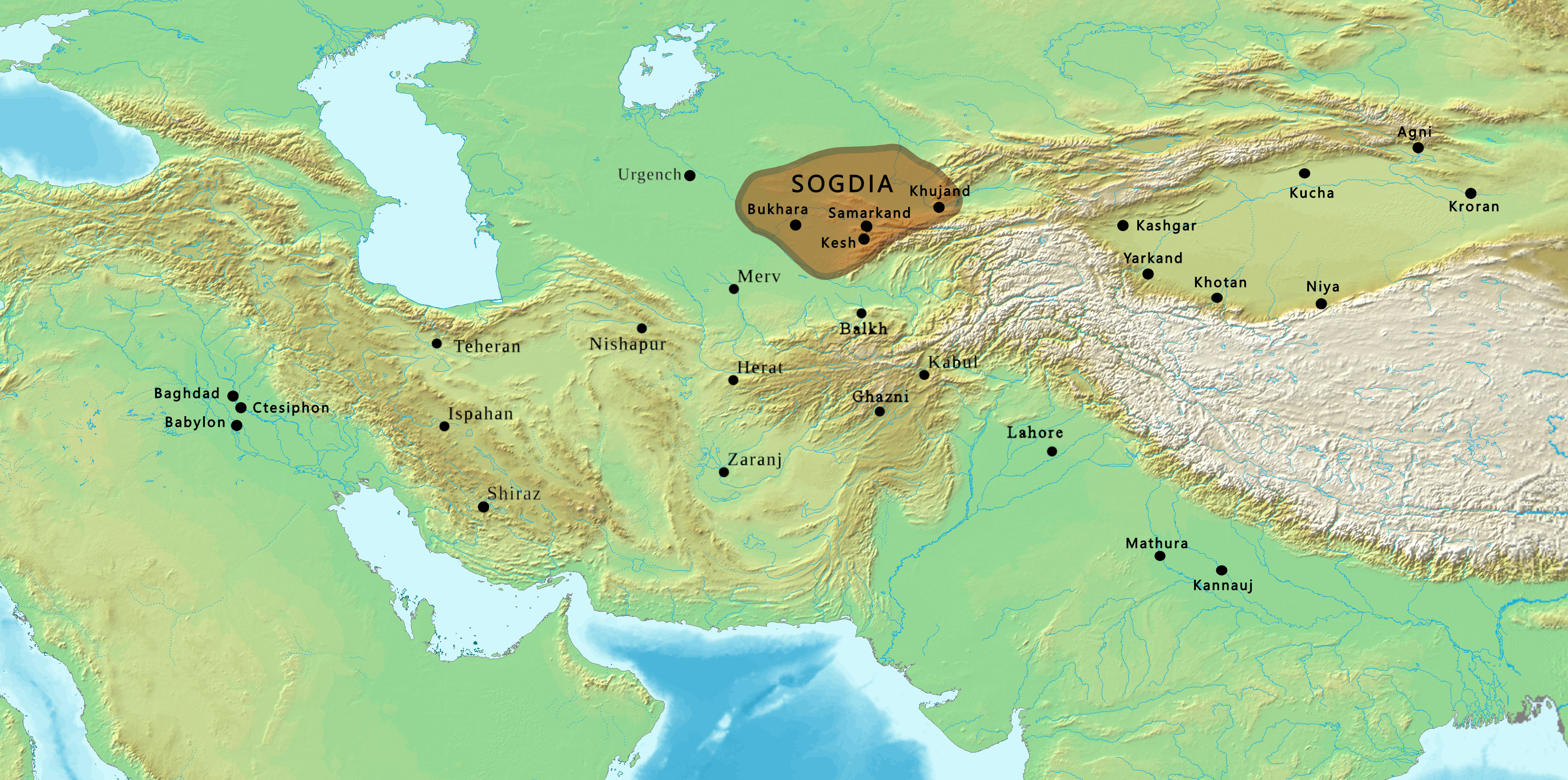
- Map of the Sogdia the country where the revolution took place
| Date | 750 |
| Location | Sogdia ,Bukhara ,Samarkand |
| Result | Abbasid victory |

Belligerents
| Abbasid Caliphate | Rebels of Sogdia |

Commanders and leaders
| Abu Muslim; Ziyad ibn Salih | Sharik ibn Shaikh † |

Strength
| 20,500 | 30,000 |

Casualties and losses
| Unknown | Almost all the rebels |

Sharik ibn Shaikh's Rebellion was an 8th-century uprising in Bukhara against the newly established Abbasid Caliphate. Occurring in 750, shortly after the Abbasid Revolution, the revolt was fueled by widespread socioeconomic discontent in the region of Transoxiana.

== Background ==
Despite the transition from Umayyad to Abbasid rule, the local population saw no improvement in their living conditions, suffering under the dual taxation and "predation" of both Arab administrators and the indigenous Bukhar Khudah. Exploiting this unrest, Sharik ibn Shaikh organized a local force and launched an open rebellion against Arab authority. The insurrection was ultimately suppressed by an army led by Ziyad ibn Salih, dispatched by the Governor of Khorasan to restore Abbasid control over the region.

== Rebellion ==
Following initial defeats, Ziyad ibn Salih secured a decisive victory through a flanking maneuver that resulted in the death of Sharik ibn Shaikh and the burning of Bukhara for three days. Despite a deceptive offer of amnesty which led to the execution of Sharik's son the population remained in hiding, prompting a final bloody assault by Abbasid forces. The campaign concluded with the systematic execution of survivors and the total occupation of the devastated, depopulated city. Following the suppression of Bukhara, Ziyad ibn Salih advanced to Samarkand to eliminate the remaining rebel factions and followers of Sharik ibn Shaikh. After conducting a final massacre of the insurgents, he crossed the Amu Darya and returned to Khorasan, effectively concluding the Abbasid military expedition in Transoxiana.
