= 743 =

Calendar year

743 in various calendars
- Gregorian calendar: 743; DCCXLIII
- Ab urbe condita: 1496
- Armenian calendar: 192; ԹՎ ՃՂԲ
- Assyrian calendar: 5493
- Balinese saka calendar: 664–665
- Bengali calendar: 149–150
- Berber calendar: 1693
- Buddhist calendar: 1287
- Burmese calendar: 105
- Byzantine calendar: 6251–6252
- Chinese calendar: 壬午年 (Water Horse); 3440 or 3233 — to — 癸未年 (Water Goat); 3441 or 3234
- Coptic calendar: 459–460
- Discordian calendar: 1909
- Ethiopian calendar: 735–736
- Hebrew calendar: 4503–4504
- Hindu calendars
- Vikram Samvat: 799–800
- Shaka Samvat: 664–665
- Kali Yuga: 3843–3844
- Holocene calendar: 10743
- Iranian calendar: 121–122
- Islamic calendar: 125–126
- Japanese calendar: Tenpyō 15 (天平１５年)
- Javanese calendar: 637–638
- Julian calendar: 743; DCCXLIII
- Korean calendar: 3076
- Minguo calendar: 1169 before ROC 民前1169年
- Nanakshahi calendar: −725
- Seleucid era: 1054/1055 AG
- Thai solar calendar: 1285–1286
- Tibetan calendar: ཆུ་ཕོ་རྟ་ལོ་ (male Water-Horse); 869 or 488 or −284 — to — ཆུ་མོ་ལུག་ལོ་ (female Water-Sheep); 870 or 489 or −283

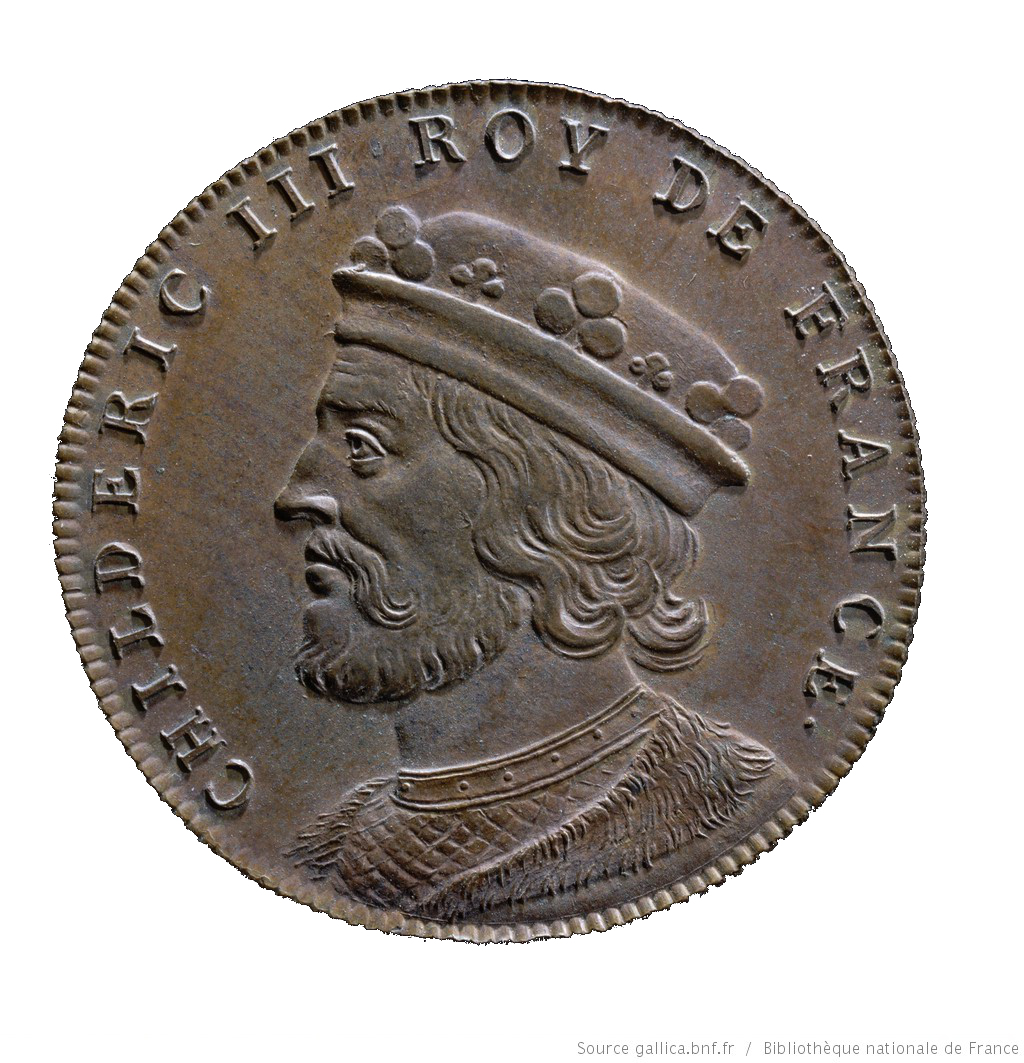
King Childeric III (743–752)

Year 743 (DCCXLIII) was a common year starting on Tuesday of the Julian calendar. The denomination 743 for this year has been used since the early medieval period, when the Anno Domini calendar era became the prevalent method in Europe for naming years.

== Events ==
=== By place ===
==== Byzantine Empire ====
- Summer – Emperor Constantine V defeats his brother-in-law Artabasdos, who has led a two-year insurrection in an attempt to usurp the Byzantine throne. He heads for Constantinople, and captures the capital three months later. Artabasdos and his son Niketas are publicly blinded, and relegated to the monastery of Chora. Constantine renews his policy of Iconoclasm.
- Constantine V reforms the old Imperial Guard of Constantinople into new elite cavalry and infantry units, called tagmata (Greek for 'the regiments'). He uses these troops against a rebellious theme in north-west Anatolia (modern Turkey), and later for offensive campaigns against Arab Muslim raiders and Bulgars.

==== Europe ====
- Childeric III succeeds to the throne of the Frankish Kingdom as the last Merovingian king, (until his death in 754) following an interregnum of seven years after the throne was left vacant after the death of the previous king Theuderic IV. Power remains firmly in the hands of the major domus, currently Carloman and Pepin the Short.
- Duke Odilo of Bavaria comes to the aid of Boruth, prince (knyaz) of the Carantanians, against repeated Avar incursions in present-day Austria, and is able to vassalize the Slavic principality. In exchange for Bavarian assistance, Boruth accepts his overlordship and is converted to Christianity.

==== Britain ====
- King Æthelbald of Mercia joins forces with Wessex and attacks Gwent and Powys in Mid Wales (approximate date).

==== Arabian Empire ====
- February 6 – Caliph Hisham ibn Abd al-Malik dies after a 19-year reign, in which the Arab expansion in Europe has been stopped and the Umayyad Caliphate has come under pressure from the Turks in Central Asia and Berbers in North Africa. He is succeeded by his nephew Al-Walid II, who has Khalid al-Qasri, former governor of Iraq, imprisoned and tortured.

==== Japan ====
- Emperor Shōmu changes the law of Perpetual Ownership of Cultivated Lands. This permits aristocrats and members of the clergy to cultivate land. The new farmland will be called shoin.

==== Americas ====
- In one of the final battles of the Third Tikal-Calakmul War, the city of El Peru is taken by Tikal.

==== Asia ====
- 743 Caspian Gates earthquake. It took place in the Caspian Gates (Gates of Alexander). The location is identified with either Derbent, Russia or Talis, Iran.

=== By topic ===
==== Religion ====
- The Concilium Germanicum: First major Church synod held in the eastern parts of the Frankish Kingdom. Organized by Carloman, Mayor of the Palace of Austrasia, and presided over by Saint Boniface, who is solidified in his position as leader of the Frankish church.

== Births ==
- ′Abd Allah ibn Wahb, Muslim jurist (d. 813)

== Deaths ==
- February 6 – Hisham ibn Abd al-Malik, Muslim caliph (b. 691)
- Eucherius, Frankish bishop
- Godescalc, duke of Benevento
- Khalid al-Qasri, Syrian Arab governor
- Pei Yaoqing, chancellor of the Tang dynasty (b. 681)
- Rigobert, Frankish abbot and bishop
- Theudimer (also known as Tudmir), Visigothic count
- Wihtburh, Anglo-Saxon abbess

== Sources ==
- Guidoboni, Emanuela; Traina, Giusto (1995), "A new catalogue of earthquakes in the historical Armenian area from antiquity to the 12th century", Annals of Geophysics, 38 8, doi:10.4401/ag-4134
