= 742 =

Calendar year

742 in various calendars
- Gregorian calendar: 742; DCCXLII
- Ab urbe condita: 1495
- Armenian calendar: 191; ԹՎ ՃՂԱ
- Assyrian calendar: 5492
- Balinese saka calendar: 663–664
- Bengali calendar: 148–149
- Berber calendar: 1692
- Buddhist calendar: 1286
- Burmese calendar: 104
- Byzantine calendar: 6250–6251
- Chinese calendar: 辛巳年 (Metal Snake); 3439 or 3232 — to — 壬午年 (Water Horse); 3440 or 3233
- Coptic calendar: 458–459
- Discordian calendar: 1908
- Ethiopian calendar: 734–735
- Hebrew calendar: 4502–4503
- Hindu calendars
- Vikram Samvat: 798–799
- Shaka Samvat: 663–664
- Kali Yuga: 3842–3843
- Holocene calendar: 10742
- Iranian calendar: 120–121
- Islamic calendar: 124–125
- Japanese calendar: Tenpyō 14 (天平１４年)
- Javanese calendar: 636–637
- Julian calendar: 742; DCCXLII
- Korean calendar: 3075
- Minguo calendar: 1170 before ROC 民前1170年
- Nanakshahi calendar: −726
- Seleucid era: 1053/1054 AG
- Thai solar calendar: 1284–1285
- Tibetan calendar: ལྕགས་མོ་སྦྲུལ་ལོ་ (female Iron-Snake); 868 or 487 or −285 — to — ཆུ་ཕོ་རྟ་ལོ་ (male Water-Horse); 869 or 488 or −284

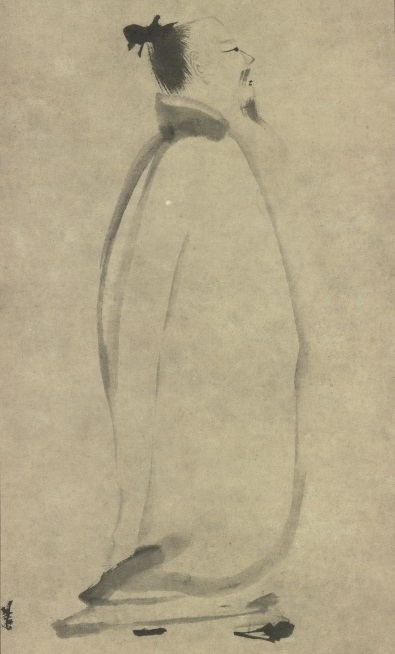
Li Bai (also Li Po) (701–762)

Year 742 (DCCXLII) was a common year starting on Monday of the Julian calendar, the 742nd year of the Common Era (CE) and Anno Domini (AD) designations, the 742nd year of the 1st millennium, the 42nd year of the 8th century, and the 3rd year of the 740s decade. The denomination 742 for this year has been used since the early medieval period, when the Anno Domini calendar era became the prevalent method in Europe for naming years.

== Events ==
=== By place ===
==== Europe ====
- King Liutprand of the Lombards meets Pope Zachary at Terni (Central Italy), who appeals to the king's religious faith. Liutprand is a pious Catholic and signs a 20-year peace treaty, restoring the cities of the Duchy of Rome which he has captured. The independent Lombard duchies of Spoleto and Benevento absorb into the Lombard Kingdom.
- Arab-Byzantine Wars: Arab forces under Sulayman ibn Hisham invade Anatolia, reaching as far as Herakleia, and return with much wealth and livestock.
- Umayyad conquest of Hispania: Arab forces under Abd al-Malik ibn Katan al-Fihri, governor (wali) of Al-Andalus, suppress the Berber rebellion in the region of Mértola (modern Portugal).
- Teodato Ipato succeeds his father Orso Ipato, as the fourth doge of Venice. He moves the capital from Heraclea to Malamocco.

==== Africa ====
- The Great Berber Revolt: Muslim forces under Handhala ibn Safwan al-Kalbi, governor of Egypt, break out of besieged Kairouan (Tunisia). He scatters the Berbers, the western and central Maghreb remained under the control of the Berber Kharijites.

==== Asia ====
- Emperor Xuan Zong begins to favor Taoism over Buddhism, adopting the new reign title Tianbao ("Heavenly Treasures"), to indicate his divine mandate. The total number of enlisted troops in the Tang armies has risen to about half a million, due to Xuan Zongs's earlier military reforms.
- For the municipal census of the Chinese capital city Chang'an and its metropolitan area of Jingzhou (including small towns in the vicinity), the New Book of Tang records that in this year there are 362,921 registered families with 1,960,188 people.
- Li Bai (also Li Po), Chinese poet, is summoned by Xuan Zong to attend the imperial court. He and his friend Du Fu become the two most prominent figures in the flourishing of Chinese poetry, during the mid-Tang dynasty.

=== By topic ===
==== Religion ====
- After a 40-year vacancy, Stephen IV becomes Orthodox patriarch of Antioch, at the suggestion of caliph Hisham ibn Abd al-Malik.
- Chrodegang, chancellor of Charles Martel, is appointed bishop of Metz and embarks on a reorganisation of the Frankish church.
- Sturm, disciple of Boniface, establishes the Benedictine Abbey of Fulda (present-day Hesse) in Germany (or 744).
- The Holy Face of Lucca is transferred to Lucca from Luni (approximate date).
- Al-Ja'd ibn Dirham, 8th century Muslim rational theologian was arrested,executed and publicly decapitated in Kufa,Iraq during the holiday of Eid al-Adha by Umayyad Caliph Hisham ibn Abd al-Malik.

== Births ==
- Charlemagne, king and emperor of the Franks (approximate date)
- De Zong, emperor of the Tang dynasty (d. 805)
- Himiltrude, wife of Charlemagne (approximate date)
- Ibrahim al-Mawsili, musician and singer (d. 804)
- Liu Congyi, chancellor of the Tang dynasty (d. 785)
- Ludger, Frisian missionary (approximate date)
- Muhammad ibn Mansur al-Mahdi, Muslim caliph (or 745)
- Odo of Metz, Frankish architect (d. 814)

== Deaths ==
- Abd al-Malik ibn Katan al-Fihri, Arab governor
- Acca, bishop of Hexham (or 740)
- Áed Balb mac Indrechtaig, king of Connacht (Ireland)
- Al-Ja'd ibn Dirham,Persian rational theologist
- Balj ibn Bishr al-Qushayri, Arab general and governor
- Cathal mac Finguine, king of Munster (Ireland)
- Itzamnaaj B'alam II, ruler of Yaxchilan (b. 647)
- Liutfrid, duke of Alsace (approximate date)
- Niu Xianke, chancellor of the Tang dynasty (b. 675)
- Ōno no Azumabito, Japanese samurai and official
- Orso Ipato, doge of Venice
- Wang Zhihuan, Chinese poet (b. 688)
