= 743 Caspian Gates earthquake =

Earthquake in the Caspian Gates occurring around the year 743

Coordinates: 37.7994°N 48.9247°E

The 743 Caspian Gates earthquake reportedly took place in the year 743 or 744 in the Caspian Gates (Gates of Alexander). The location is identified with either Derbent, Russia or Tālesh, Iran.

The earthquake is recorded in sources from the Byzantine Empire. The chronicler Theophanes the Confessor (8th century) dates the earthquake in the year 6235 of the Byzantine calendar, in the third regnal year of Constantine V (reigned 741–775). This translates to year 743 or 744 of the Anno Domini system. According to Theophanes' narrative, a sign appeared in the north at the time of the earthquake, and dust fell in various places. This narrative is repeated by George Kedrenos (12th century), who used Theophanes as his source.

According to a 1982 seismic catalogue by Ambraseys and Melville, this earthquake occurred to the east of Ray, Iran, in the valley of Tang-e Sar-e Darreh. Its recording in Byzantine sources would testify to this being a "large magnitude event". However, the geographic term "Caspian Gates" was used for a number of mountain passes in the Caucasus. The passes linked the Mediterranean Sea regions to the Iranian plateau and Central Asia.

The term Caspian Gates was familiar to Greco-Roman authors. By the Byzantine era, it mainly referred to the most important pass between the Caucasus and Northern Iran, the pass of Derbent. It was also known as "the Gate" or "the Gate of Gates". An Armenian translation of Pseudo-Callisthenes' Alexander Romance instead identifies the Caspian Gates with the territory of Talis.

In the 19th century, Karl Ernst Adolf von Hoff and Robert Mallet theorized that the Caspian Gates should be identified with the pass of Dariel, which was located near the Black Sea.

== Sources ==
- Guidoboni, Emanuela; Traina, Giusto (1995), "A new catalogue of earthquakes in the historical Armenian area from antiquity to the 12th century", Annals of Geophysics, 38, doi:10.4401/ag-4134
