= 750 =

Calendar year

750 in various calendars
- Gregorian calendar: 750; DCCL
- Ab urbe condita: 1503
- Armenian calendar: 199; ԹՎ ՃՂԹ
- Assyrian calendar: 5500
- Balinese saka calendar: 671–672
- Bengali calendar: 156–157
- Berber calendar: 1700
- Buddhist calendar: 1294
- Burmese calendar: 112
- Byzantine calendar: 6258–6259
- Chinese calendar: 己丑年 (Earth Ox); 3447 or 3240 — to — 庚寅年 (Metal Tiger); 3448 or 3241
- Coptic calendar: 466–467
- Discordian calendar: 1916
- Ethiopian calendar: 742–743
- Hebrew calendar: 4510–4511
- Hindu calendars
- Vikram Samvat: 806–807
- Shaka Samvat: 671–672
- Kali Yuga: 3850–3851
- Holocene calendar: 10750
- Iranian calendar: 128–129
- Islamic calendar: 132–133
- Japanese calendar: Tenpyō-shōhō 2 (天平勝宝２年)
- Javanese calendar: 644–645
- Julian calendar: 750; DCCL
- Korean calendar: 3083
- Minguo calendar: 1162 before ROC 民前1162年
- Nanakshahi calendar: −718
- Seleucid era: 1061/1062 AG
- Thai solar calendar: 1292–1293
- Tibetan calendar: ས་མོ་གླང་ལོ་ (female Earth-Ox); 876 or 495 or −277 — to — ལྕགས་ཕོ་སྟག་ལོ་ (male Iron-Tiger); 877 or 496 or −276

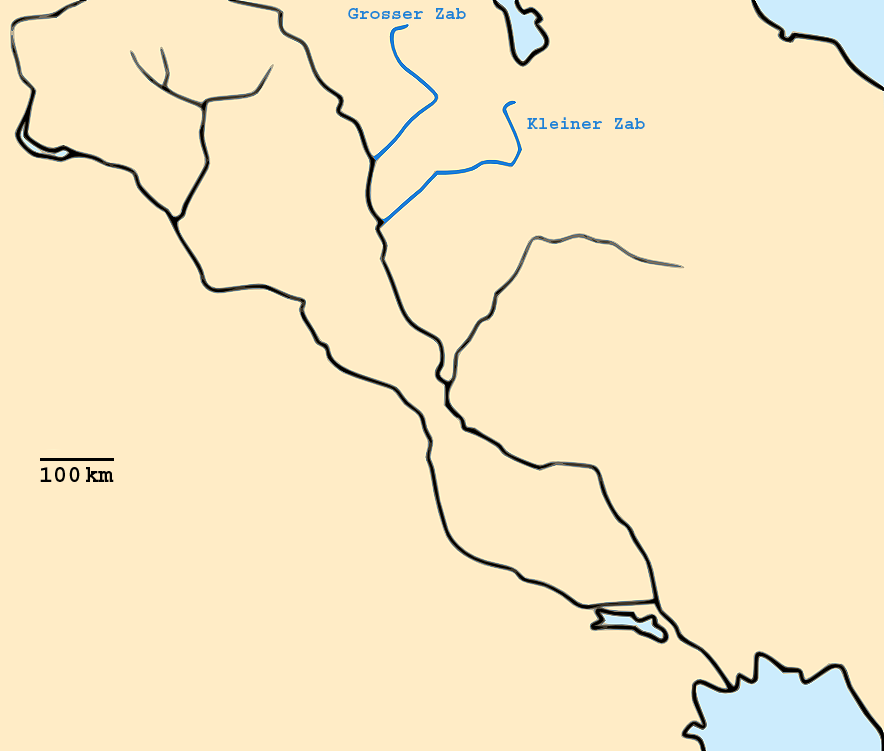
Map of the Great Zab river (Northern Iraq)

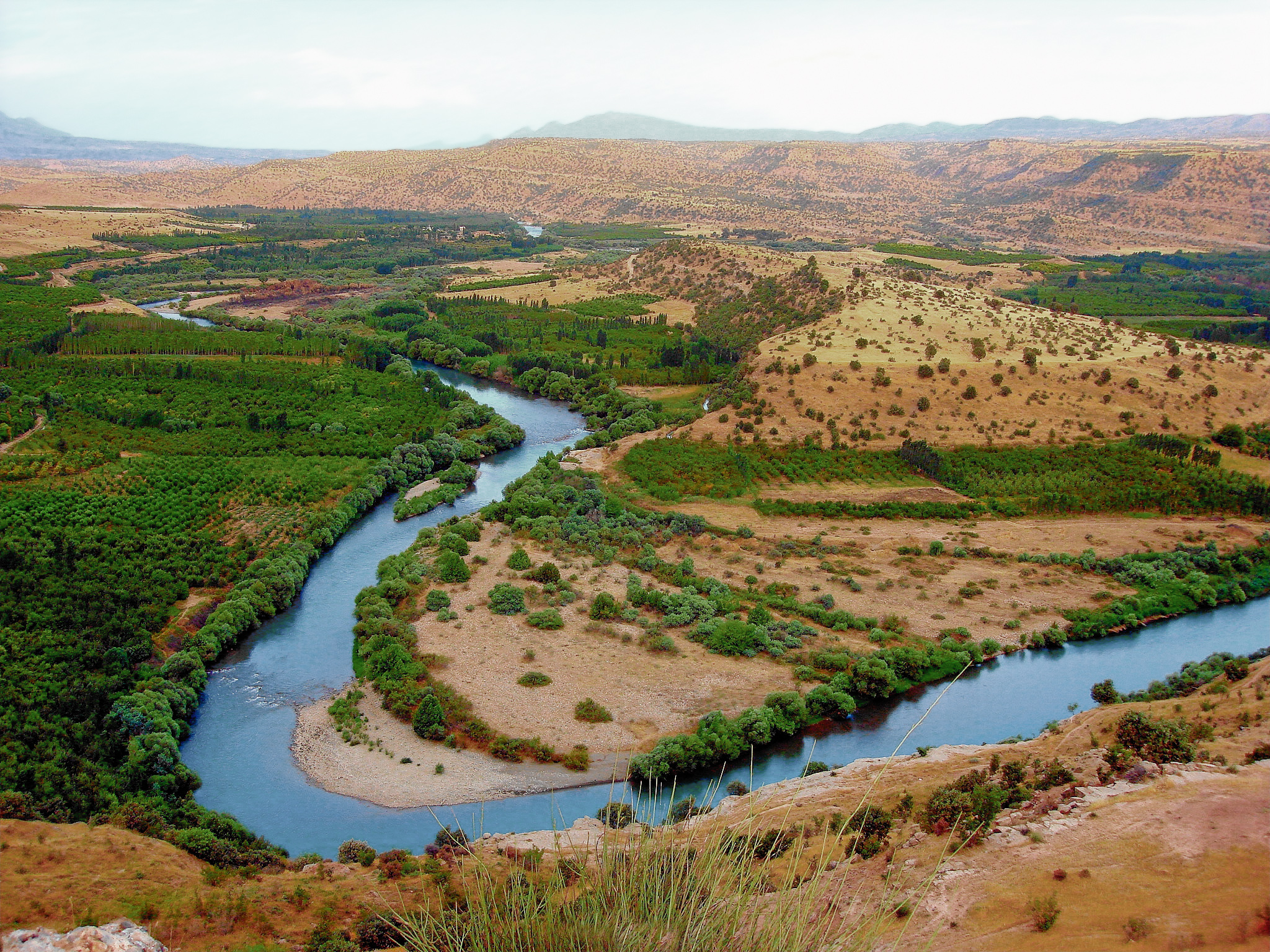
The Great Zab river near Erbil (Iraq)

Year 750 (DCCL) was a common year starting on Thursday of the Julian calendar, the 750th year of the Common Era (CE) and Anno Domini (AD) designations, the 750th year of the 1st millennium, the 50th year of the 8th century, and the 1st year of the 750s decade. The denomination 750 for this year has been used since the early medieval period, when the Anno Domini calendar era became the prevalent method in Europe for naming years. According to historian Peter Brown, this year marked the universal beginning of the Middle Ages across every human civilization, thus marking the end of the late antiquity along with the classical world.

== Events ==
=== Egypt ===
- Military action continues in the Bashmurian war. Egyptians granted tax breaks in the Nile Delta.

=== Arab Caliphate ===
- January 25 – Battle of the Zab: Abbasid forces under Abdallah ibn Ali defeat the Umayyads near the Great Zab River. Members of the Umayyad house are hunted down and killed. Defeated by his rivals, Caliph Marwan II flees westward to Egypt, perhaps attempting to reach Al-Andalus (Iberian Peninsula), where there are still significant Umayyad armies.

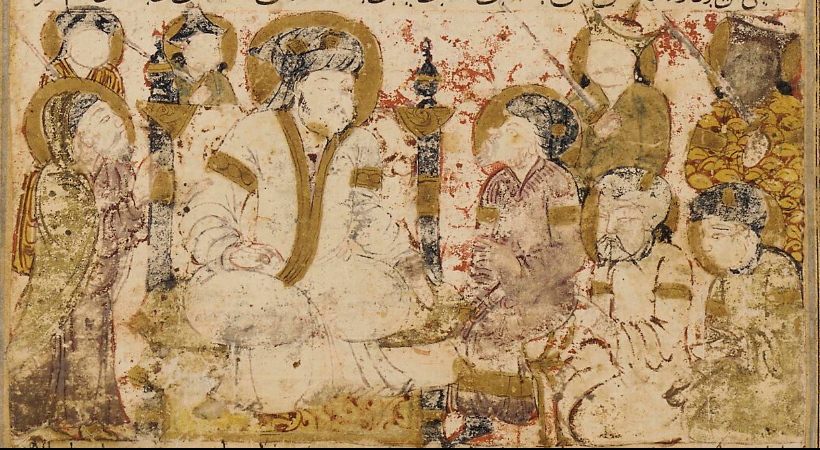
Al-Saffah became caliph (ruler) of the Islamic Caliphate on 25 January 750. He ruled from 750 to 10 June 754.

- August 6 – Marwan II is caught and killed at Faiyum by supporters of the Abbasid caliph As-Saffah. Almost the entire Umayyad Dynasty is assassinated; Prince Abd al-Rahman I escapes to Al-Andalus. The Abbasids assume control of the Islamic world and establish their first capital at Kufa.

=== Europe ===
- King Alfonso I of Asturias establishes the Kingdom of Galicia, in roughly the northwest of the Iberian Peninsula. The exact time this happened is contested.
- The town Slaný in the Central Bohemian Region (Czech Republic) is founded at the site of a salt spring, according to one chronicle written in the sixteenth century (approximate date).

=== Britain ===
- King Eadberht of Northumbria imprisons Cynewulf, bishop of Lindisfarne, at Bamburgh Castle. King Eadberht does this in order to punish the bishop for sheltering one of his enemies, Prince Offa. He then besieges Prince Offa, son of the late King Aldfrith, in Lindisfarne Priory. Almost dead from hunger, he is dragged from his sanctuary and put to death.
- Battle of Mugdock: The Strathclyde Britons under King Teudebur defeat Prince Talorgan of the Picts. This leads to the decline of the power of King Óengus I.

=== Africa ===
- The Ghana Empire begins (approximate date).

=== India ===
- Gopala I is proclaimed as the first ruler and founder of the Pala Empire.

=== America ===
- Native Americans, in the area now known as the Four Corners, begin constructing and occupying pueblos.
- The city of Teotihuacan (modern Mexico) is destroyed and left in ruins, its palaces burned to the ground.

=== Indonesia ===
- Borobudur, or Barabudur (a Mahayana Buddhist temple in Magelang, Central Java, Indonesia, as well as the world's largest Buddhist temple, and also one of the greatest Buddhist monuments in the world) is built (approximate date).
- Plumpungan encryption dated 24 July 750 AD. Containing the legal status of Hampra village as non-taxed territory of Buddhist King Bhanu (Rakai Panangkaran). Hampra would later evolve into the City of Salatiga in Central Java. Claiming to be the second oldest city recorded in Indonesia based on the date of the encryption.

=== By topic ===
==== Art ====
- The "Western Paradise" of Amitābha Buddha, detail of a wall painting in Cave 217, Dunhuang (China), is made during the Tang Dynasty (approximate date).

==== Food and drink ====
- In China during the Tang Dynasty, a barge load of tea (a medicinal herb) comes up the Grand Canal to Luoyang, from Zhejiang (approximate date).

== Births ==
- January 25 – Leo IV, Byzantine emperor (d. 780)
- Abbas ibn al-Ahnaf, Abbasid poet (d. 809)
- Abd al-Malik ibn Salih, Abbasid general (d. 812)
- Arno, archbishop of Salzburg (approximate date)
- Bermudo I, king of Asturias (approximate date)
- Clement, Irish scholar and saint (approximate date)
- Eigil of Fulda, Bavarian abbot (approximate date)
- Hildegrim, bishop of Châlons (approximate date)
- Leo III, pope of the Catholic Church (d. 816)
- Sawara, Japanese prince (approximate date)
- Theodulf, bishop of Orléans (or 760)
- Wu Shaocheng, general of the Tang Dynasty (d. 810)

== Deaths ==
- January 25 – Ibrahim ibn al-Walid, Umayyad caliph
- August 6 – Marwan II, ruling Umayyad caliph (b. 688)
- Abdallah ibn Abd al-Malik, Umayyad prince (or 749)
- Agilulfus, bishop of Cologne (approximate date)
- Al-Abbas ibn al-Walid, Umayyad prince and general
- Basil the Confessor, Eastern Orthodox saint
- Boruth, prince (knyaz) of Carantania (approximate date)
- Bressal mac Áedo Róin, Dál Fiatach king of Ulaid
- Burchard, bishop of Würzburg (approximate date)
- Himelin, Scottish priest (approximate date)
- Inreachtach mac Dluthach, king of Uí Maine (Ireland)
- Irene of Khazaria, Byzantine empress (approximate date)
- Isonokami no Otomaro, Japanese nobleman
- Veborg, Scandinavian shieldmaiden (approximate date)
