= Inreachtach mac Dluthach =

King of Uí Maine

Inreachtach mac Dluthach, 21st King of Uí Maine, died 750.

== Ancestry ==
Inreachtach was the son of king Dluthach mac Fithcheallach (died 738).

== Descendants ==
He had one recorded son, Ailell mac Inreachtach, who became king, and died c.791/799.

== Reign ==
Inreachtach's reign was brief. The Annals of the Four Masters note his death sub anno 750 though neither the details or context of the circumstances are given.

== Dynastic ramifications ==
His brother, Flaitheamail, was the ancestor of a sept of the dynasty called Clann Flaitheamail.

His first cousin, Cosgrach, son of Fidhchellach, had as his great-great grandson Flann mac Aedhagan, who was the ancestor of the Clann Mac Aodhagáin (Egan).

Preceded by Ailello hui Daimine	King of Uí Maine; 749–750	Succeeded by Aedh Ailghin
