= 744 =

Calendar year

744 in various calendars
Gregorian calendar	744; DCCXLIV
Ab urbe condita	1497
Armenian calendar	193; ԹՎ ՃՂԳ
Assyrian calendar	5494
Balinese saka calendar	665–666
Bengali calendar	150–151
Berber calendar	1694
Buddhist calendar	1288
Burmese calendar	106
Byzantine calendar	6252–6253
Chinese calendar	癸未年 (Water Goat); 3441 or 3234 — to — 甲申年 (Wood Monkey); 3442 or 3235
Coptic calendar	460–461
Discordian calendar	1910
Ethiopian calendar	736–737
Hebrew calendar	4504–4505
- Hindu calendars
Vikram Samvat	800–801
Shaka Samvat	665–666
Kali Yuga	3844–3845
Holocene calendar	10744
Iranian calendar	122–123
Islamic calendar	126–127
Japanese calendar	Tenpyō 16 (天平１６年)
Javanese calendar	638–639
Julian calendar	744; DCCXLIV
Korean calendar	3077
Minguo calendar	1168 before ROC 民前1168年
Nanakshahi calendar	−724
Seleucid era	1055/1056 AG
Thai solar calendar	1286–1287
Tibetan calendar	ཆུ་མོ་ལུག་ལོ་ (female Water-Sheep); 870 or 489 or −283 — to — ཤིང་ཕོ་སྤྲེ་ལོ་ (male Wood-Monkey); 871 or 490 or −282

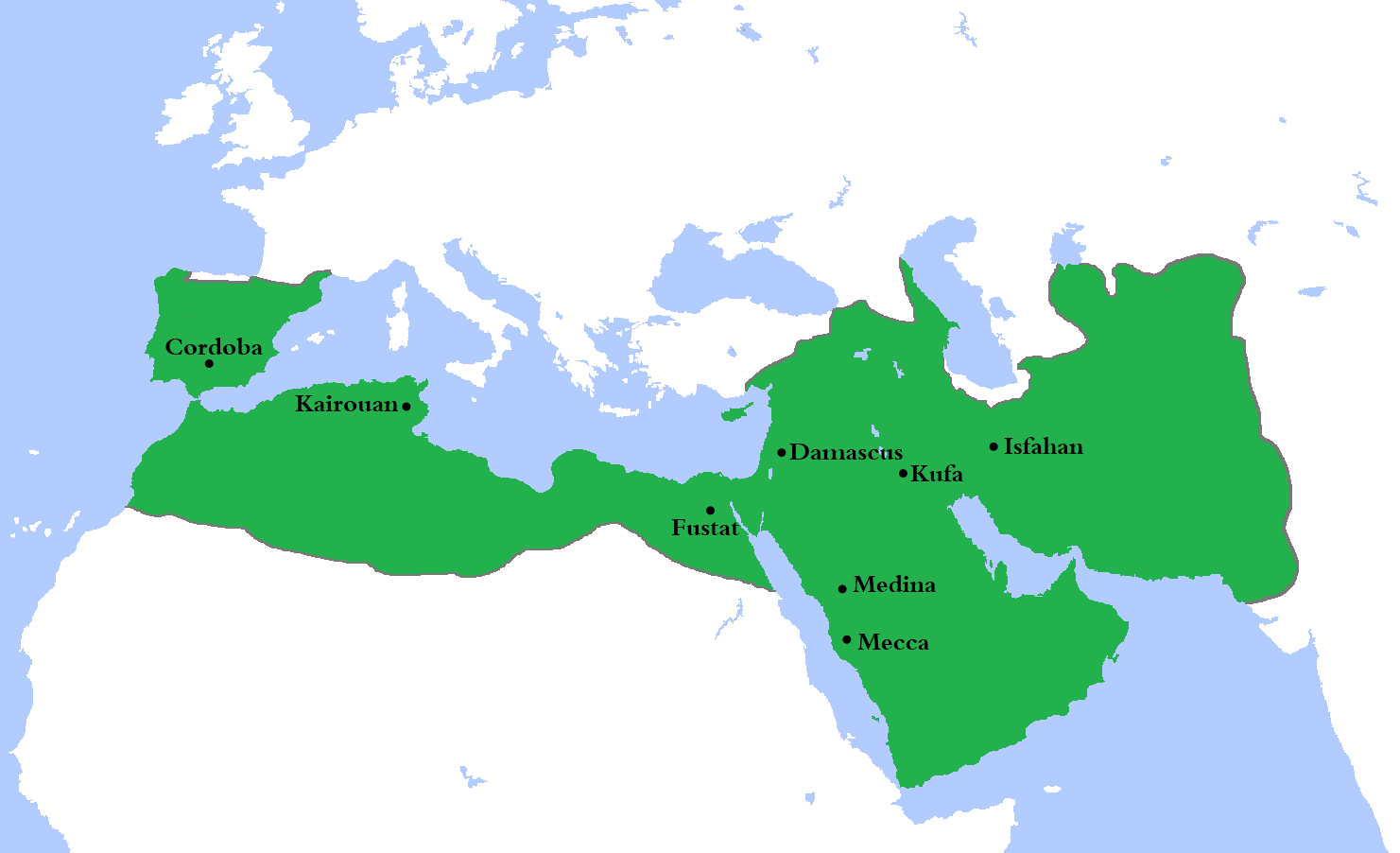
The Umayyad Caliphate (661–750)

Year 744 (DCCXLIV) was a leap year starting on Wednesday of the Julian calendar. The denomination 744 for this year has been used since the early medieval period, when the Anno Domini calendar era became the prevalent method in Europe for naming years.

== Events ==
=== By place ===
==== Europe ====
- February – King Liutprand of the Lombards dies of natural causes after a 32-year reign, in which he has defeated the dukes of Spoleto and Benevento, bringing the Lombard Kingdom to the height of her power. He is succeeded by Hildeprand, called "the Useless" (nephew or grandson of Liutprand), as ruler of the Lombards.
- October – Hildeprand is deposed by the council of nobles, for his incompetence as ruler. He is succeeded by Ratchis (formerly duke of Friuli) as king of the Lombards, who makes peace with Pope Zachary.
- Pepin the Short, mayor of the palace of Neustria and Burgundy, invades the Swabian Jura (southwestern Germany), and chases Theudebald, Duke of Alamannia, from his mountain redoubt in Alsace.

==== Switzerland ====
- In 741 and 744, documents in the archives of St. Gallen Abbey describe the village of Kempraten as Centoprato, another document in 863 as Centiprata, inspired by the Latin name Centum Prata.
- A nunnery given by the Alamannic noblewoman Beata on Lützelau Island is first mentioned, and is in this year sold to Einsiedeln Abbey.
- Ufenau island in Switzerland is first mentioned in 741 as "Hupinauia", and in 744 as "Ubinauvia" — island of Huppan of Huphan.

==== Britain ====
- Wat's Dyke, a 40 mile (64 km) earthwork in present-day Wales, is constructed. The border between Mercia and Powys is set here. The date that Wat's Dyke was constructed is very uncertain, with some estimates linking the construction of the dyke to the 5th century and others to the early 9th century (approximate date).

==== Arabian Empire ====
- April 17 – Caliph Al-Walid II is besieged in his castle outside the city of Damascus. He is defeated and killed by Arab forces under Sulayman ibn Hisham. Al-Walid is succeeded by his cousin Yazid III, who dies shortly after of a brain tumor.

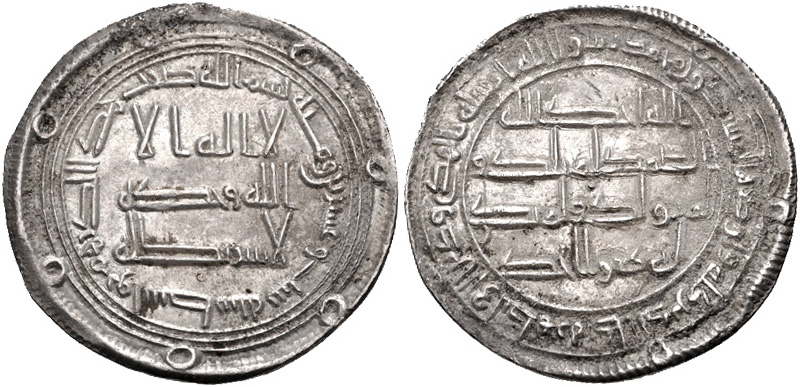
Dirham of caliph Ibrahim ibn al-Walid. He ruled the caliphate for just two months

- December – Marwan ibn Muhammad rebels against Yazid's designated successor Ibrahim ibn al-Walid, defeats the Umayyad forces under Sulayman ibn Hisham, and becomes caliph.

==== Africa ====
- Tunisian Coup: Following the death of the Umayyad caliph, Hisham, Abd al-Rahman ibn Habib assembles a small force in Tunis and declares himself emir of Ifriqiya. Handhala ibn Safwan al-Kalbi, wali of Ifriqiya decides against fighting and returns to Damascus. Abd al-Rahman installs himself in Kairouan, and crushes multiple revolts around the country.

==== Asia ====
- Turkic subjects like Uyghur, Karluk and Basmyl, who are not the members of the Ashina clan, stage a coup. This ends the Turkic Empire and Ashina clan (except in Khazaria).
- Autumn – Li Bai (also Li Po), Chinese poet and skilled calligrapher, meets Du Fu for the first time.
- The Japanese imperial capital is moved from Kuni-kyō to Heijō-kyō.

==== Central America ====
- February 4 – In the Third Tikal-Calakmul War in what is now Guatemala, the Mayan city-state of Tikal conquers the state of Naranjo and captures its king, Yax Mayuy Chan Chaak, who is subsequently sacrificed. The conquest by Tikal destroys Calakmul's once powerful and extensive network of allies, vassal states and trade networks.

=== By topic ===
==== Religion ====
- Synod of Soissons. Called at the instigation of Pepin the Short and Boniface, archbishop and metropolitan, it secures the condemnation of the Frankish bishop Adalbert.
- Sturm, disciple of Boniface, establishes the Benedictine Abbey of Fulda (Hesse), as part of Boniface's mission to bring Christianity to the pagan tribes in Germany (or 742).
- June – Pope Zachary gives his approval by sending Abel, Grimo and Hartbert their palliums for the metropolitan sees of Reims, Rouen and Sens.
- Salih ibn Tarif proclaims himself a prophet among the Barghawata, a confederation of Berber tribes in modern-day western Morocco.

== Births ==
- Muhammad ibn Mansur al-Mahdi, Muslim caliph (or 745)

== Deaths ==
- April 17 – Al-Walid II, Muslim caliph (b. 706)
- September 25 – Yazid III, Muslim caliph (b. 701)
- He Zhizhang, Chinese poet
- Hildeprand, king of the Lombards
- Huoching, Alamannic nobleman
- Kül-chor, ruler (khagan) of the Turgesh
- Liutprand, king of the Lombards
- Özmiş Qaghan, ruler of the Second Turkic Khaganate
- Stephen IV, patriarch of Antioch

== Sources ==
- Hallenbeck, Jan T. (1982). "Pavia and Rome: The Lombard Monarchy and the Papacy in the Eighth Century". Transactions of the American Philosophical Society. New Series. 72 (4): 1–186. doi:10.2307/1006429. JSTOR 1006429.
- Wickham, Chris (1981). Early Medieval Italy: Central Power and Local Society, 400–1000. London: Macmillan.
