= Karl Ernst Adolf von Hoff =

German geologist

Karl Ernst Adolf von Hoff (1 November 1771 in Gotha – 24 May 1837 in Gotha) was a German natural historian and geologist.

After studying law, physics and natural history, in 1791 he was appointed to a diplomatic post by Ernest II, Duke of Saxe-Gotha-Altenburg. From 1832 onwards he was the director of Gotha's royal science and art collections and he also wrote the five-volume Geschichte der durch Überlieferung nachgewiesenen natürlichen Veränderungen der Erdoberfläche from 1822 to 1841.

== Career and Contributions to Geology ==
In 1813 Von Hoff became Privy Councilor. From 1817 to 1820, he cooperated with Johann Wolfgang von Goethe in the reorganization of the University of Jena. After the death of the last duke of Saxe-Gotha-Altenburg, Frederick IV, who died without descendants, von Hoff introduced the new inheritance regulations to prevent the scattering of the rich scientific collections and art collections in Gotha at Schloss Friedenstein, which he took over in 1832. In 1826 he was elected foreign member of the Göttingen Academy of Sciences. In 1836, a year before his death, he was elected a member of the German Academy of Sciences Leopoldina.

Von Hoff's "History of natural changes in the earth's surface proven by tradition" (5 volumes, Gotha 1822–1841) justified the principle of actuality (Actualism, in German Aktualitätsprinzip) in departure from the catastrophe theory (cataclysm theory) and cleared the way for the scientific nature of geology. Another independent author of the principle of actuality is James Hutton in Scotland. Charles Lyell, widely regarded as a developer of up-to-dateness and generally acknowledging him, found it independent of Hoff, but later acknowledged Hoff's priority.

In the words of Victor R. Baker, "...Lyell used the understanding of present-day causes to interpret the deep past — a principle termed actualism. Rudwick [in Worlds Before Adam] explains that Lyell's excellent descriptions ... derived from an original listing by the eighteenth-century German scholar Karl Ernst Adolf von Hoff. Lyell greatly extended the actualistic method by making pronouncements about how the complex geological processes of the past occurred through the progressive action of small-scale procedures that were still in operation, and by prescribing how geologists should reason about these past processes." — from "Geological history turned upside down" a book review of Worlds Before Adam: The Reconstruction of Geohistory in the Age of Reform, by Martin J. S. Rudwick, in Nature, Published: 23 July 2008

== miscellaneous ==
His extensive mineralogical collection was donated by Hoff in 1818 to the Natural History Cabinet in Gotha.

Karl Ernst Adolf von Hoff found his final resting place on the Gothaer Cemetery I also called Alter Gottesacker. During the 1904 evacuation of the cemetery his grave was also leveled.
