= 800 =

Calendar year

800 in various calendars
- Gregorian calendar: 800; DCCC
- Ab urbe condita: 1553
- Armenian calendar: 249; ԹՎ ՄԽԹ
- Assyrian calendar: 5550
- Balinese saka calendar: 721–722
- Bengali calendar: 206–207
- Berber calendar: 1750
- Buddhist calendar: 1344
- Burmese calendar: 162
- Byzantine calendar: 6308–6309
- Chinese calendar: 己卯年 (Earth Rabbit); 3497 or 3290 — to — 庚辰年 (Metal Dragon); 3498 or 3291
- Coptic calendar: 516–517
- Discordian calendar: 1966
- Ethiopian calendar: 792–793
- Hebrew calendar: 4560–4561
- Hindu calendars
- Vikram Samvat: 856–857
- Shaka Samvat: 721–722
- Kali Yuga: 3900–3901
- Holocene calendar: 10800
- Iranian calendar: 178–179
- Islamic calendar: 183–184
- Japanese calendar: Enryaku 19 (延暦１９年)
- Javanese calendar: 695–696
- Julian calendar: 800; DCCC
- Korean calendar: 3133
- Minguo calendar: 1112 before ROC 民前1112年
- Nanakshahi calendar: −668
- Seleucid era: 1111/1112 AG
- Thai solar calendar: 1342–1343
- Tibetan calendar: ས་མོ་ཡོས་ལོ་ (female Earth-Hare); 926 or 545 or −227 — to — ལྕགས་ཕོ་འབྲུག་ལོ་ (male Iron-Dragon); 927 or 546 or −226

Year 800 (DCCC) was a leap year starting on Wednesday of the Julian calendar, the 800th year of the Common Era (CE) and Anno Domini (AD) designations, the 800th year of the 1st millennium, the 100th and last year of the 8th century, and the 1st year of the 800s decade. It was around this time that the Anno Domini calendar era became the prevalent method in Europe for naming years, so from this time on, the years began to be known as 800 and onwards.

== Events ==
=== Europe ===
- December 25 – Charlemagne, king of the Franks, is crowned Holy Roman Emperor by Pope Leo III as Charles I, with the title "Emperor of the Romans". The coronation takes place during Mass at the Basilica of St. Peter in Rome, on Christmas Day. The Frankish Empire is formed in Western Europe, which is not recognized by Empress Irene at Constantinople. This triggers a series of disputes with the Byzantines around who is officially ruling the former Western Roman Empire.
- The Rus' Khaganate is created by people who are called Rus', after the 182-year dominance of the Khazars. This is the starting period of the rise of the Kievan Rus', and the later states of Russia, Belarus and Ukraine (approximate date).
- King Eardwulf of Northumbria has his men seize Prince Ealhmund, son of the late King Alhred, and put him to death. He is buried at Derby in St. Alkmund's Church, and later revered as a saint (approximate date).
- The Abbasid Caliphate is forced to cede their holdings in southern Italy to the Aghlabid Dynasty.

=== Asia ===
- The ci, a new type of lyric poetry with irregular lines, is set to a melody during the Tang Dynasty (approximate date).

=== Africa ===
- Sijilmasa (in present-day Morocco) is founded as the departure point for caravans between North Africa and the western Sudan (approximate date).
- Ife, in present-day Nigeria, becomes an important urban center (approximate date).
- The Abbasid Caliphate is forced to cede Ifriqiya (present-day north-eastern Algeria, Tunisia and western Libya) to the Aghlabid Dynasty.

==== Central America ====
- June 28 – Ochk'in Kaloomte' Aj Ho' Baak becomes the new ruler of the Mayan city state of Machaquila in Guatemala and reigns until his death in 815.
- Itza culture starts in Mesoamerica (840).

=== Polynesia ===
- The first settlers of the Hawaiian Islands arrive (approximate date).

=== By topic ===
==== Religion ====
- Archbishop Hygeberht of Lichfield retires; he is succeeded by Ealdwulf. King Coenwulf of Mercia is on better terms with the archbishopric of Canterbury than his predecessor, and unsuccessfully attempts to have the Mercian archiepiscopal see transferred to London (approximate date).
- The Book of Kells is written and illuminated in a Columban monastery, in Ireland (approximate date).

== Births ==
- Aldric, bishop of Le Mans (approximate date)
- Al-Abbās ibn Said al-Jawharī, Muslim mathematician
- Álvaro of Córdoba, Mozarab scholar (approximate date)
- Amoghavarsha I, king of Rashtrakuta (India) (d. 878)
- Boso the Elder, Frankish nobleman (approximate date)
- Fatima al-Fihri, Arab mosque founder (approximate date)
- Govindasvāmi, Indian astronomer (approximate date)
- Louis, Frankish abbot (approximate date)
- Methodios I, patriarch of Constantinople (or 788)
- Nicholas I, pope of the Catholic Church (d. 867)
- Nominoe, duke of Brittany (approximate date)
- Pribina, Slavic prince (approximate date)
- Robert III, Frankish nobleman (d. 834)
- Rorgon II, count of Maine (approximate date)
- Swithin, bishop of Winchester (approximate date)
- Valentine, pope of the Catholic Church (d. 827)

== Deaths ==
- June 3 – Staurakios, Byzantine chief minister
- September 26 – Berowulf, bishop of Würzburg
- Ailill mac Fergusa, king of South Brega (Ireland)
- Alkelda, Anglo-Saxon princess (approximate date)
- Beatus of Liébana, monk and theologian (approximate date)
- Ealhmund, prince of Northumbria (approximate date)
- Luitgard, Frankish queen and wife of Charlemagne
- Vatsraja, king of the Gurjara-Pratihara Dynasty
