= Zhang Jianfeng =

Zhang Jianfeng (Chinese: 張建封; pinyin: Zhāng Jiànfēng; 745–800), courtesy name Benli (本立), was a Tang dynasty statesman and general.

He flourished under the Emperor Dezong, and distinguished himself by his skilful operations against the rebels of that period. He rose to be a Minister of State, and so completely gained the confidence of the Emperor that at his last audience the latter presented him with his own riding-whip, saying, "In your fidelity and devotion, adversity works no change." His favourite concubine 盼盼 P'an-p'an, was so overcome by the news of his death that on hearing a poem in which reference was made to his grave, she threw herself out of the window and was killed.
