= Cathal Maenmaighe =

Cathal Maenmaighe (died 745) was the 19th King of Uí Maine.

Cathal appears to have taken his name from Máenmag.

During his reign, the following events occurred in Connacht and Ireland

- 739 – "The sea cast ashore a whale in Boirche, in the province of Ulster. Every one in the neighbourhood went to see it for its wondrousness. When it was slaughtered, three golden teeth were found in its head, each of which teeth contained fifty ounces. Fiachna, son of Aedh Roin, King of Ulidia, and Eochaidh, son of Breasal, chief of Ui Eathach Iveagh, sent a tooth of them to Beannchair, where it remained for a long time on the altar, to be seen by all in general."
- 742 – "Comman of Ross, who was Abbot of Cluain Mic Nois, and eke a man full of the grace of God was he, died."
- 743 – "Ships with their crews, were plainly seen in the sky this year."
- 744 – "Cluain Fearta Brenainn (Clonfert) was burned."

Preceded by Dluthach mac Fithcheallach	King of Uí Maine; 738–745	Succeeded by Ailello hui Daimine
