= Ailello hui Daimine =

Irish king (died 749)

Ailello hui Daimine (died 749) was the 20th King of Uí Maine.

The Annals of Tigernach report of him "Bass Ailello h-ui Daimine, ríg h-Úa Maine", though it does not provide the details or context of his death.

He does not seem to appear in the genealogies and, besides an apparent relationship to king Dunchadh ua Daimhine (died 780), does not seem to have left any notable progeny.

Preceded by Cathal Maenmaighe	King of Uí Maine; 745–749	Succeeded by Inreachtach mac Dluthach
