= Prince Kadobe =

Japanese prince poet

Prince Kadobe (?-745) was the grandson of Prince Naga and the great-grandson of Emperor Temmu. In 739, he lost his royal status because the Emperor wanted to thin the royal ranks. Kadobe received the title Ōhara no Mahito. He served in various governorships, including the Governor of Izumo, until he became the Minister of the Treasury. Five of his tankas have been preserved in the Man'yōshū.
