= 805 =

Calendar year

805 in various calendars
- Gregorian calendar: 805; DCCCV
- Ab urbe condita: 1558
- Armenian calendar: 254; ԹՎ ՄԾԴ
- Assyrian calendar: 5555
- Balinese saka calendar: 726–727
- Bengali calendar: 211–212
- Berber calendar: 1755
- Buddhist calendar: 1349
- Burmese calendar: 167
- Byzantine calendar: 6313–6314
- Chinese calendar: 甲申年 (Wood Monkey); 3502 or 3295 — to — 乙酉年 (Wood Rooster); 3503 or 3296
- Coptic calendar: 521–522
- Discordian calendar: 1971
- Ethiopian calendar: 797–798
- Hebrew calendar: 4565–4566
- Hindu calendars
- Vikram Samvat: 861–862
- Shaka Samvat: 726–727
- Kali Yuga: 3905–3906
- Holocene calendar: 10805
- Iranian calendar: 183–184
- Islamic calendar: 189–190
- Japanese calendar: Enryaku 24 (延暦２４年)
- Javanese calendar: 700–701
- Julian calendar: 805; DCCCV
- Korean calendar: 3138
- Minguo calendar: 1107 before ROC 民前1107年
- Nanakshahi calendar: −663
- Seleucid era: 1116/1117 AG
- Thai solar calendar: 1347–1348
- Tibetan calendar: ཤིང་ཕོ་སྤྲེ་ལོ་ (male Wood-Monkey); 931 or 550 or −222 — to — ཤིང་མོ་བྱ་ལོ་ (female Wood-Bird); 932 or 551 or −221

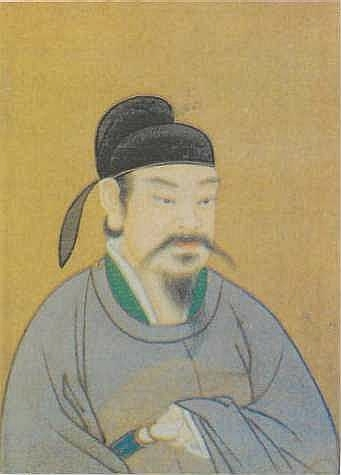
Emperor Xian Zong (778–820)

Year 805 (DCCCV) was a common year starting on Wednesday of the Julian calendar, the 805th year of the Common Era (CE) and Anno Domini (AD) designations, the 805th year of the 1st millennium, the 5th year of the 9th century, and the 6th year of the 800s decade.

== Events ==
=== By place ===
==== Byzantine Empire ====
- Siege of Patras: Local Slavic tribes of the Peloponnese lay siege to the city of Patras (modern Greece), with aid from an Arab fleet. A Byzantine relief army under Skleros, military governor (strategos) from Corinth, is sent and retakes the city. The captured Slavs in Patras are made slaves, and a church is dedicated to St. Andrew.

==== Europe ====
- Siege of Canburg: The Franks under Charles the Younger, son of emperor Charlemagne, unsuccessfully besiege Bohemians near the modern-day town of Kadaň.
- Krum, ruler (khan) of the Bulgarian Empire, conquers and destroys the Eastern part of the Avar Khaganate (approximate date).
- The first known mention of Magdeburg (Saxony-Anhalt), founded by Charlemagne, is made.

==== Asia ====
- February 25 – Emperor Dezong of Tang dies after a 25-year reign, in which the fanzhen is controlled by military governors or jiedushi, who often ignore imperial decrees. He is succeeded by his son Shunzong, who becomes ruler of the Tang Dynasty.
- August 31 – Shunzong issues an edict to yield the throne to his son Xianzong (Li Chun), because of an illness, taking for himself the title of "Retired Emperor" (Taishang Huang). Xian is confronted with political disputes in Zi Prefecture (Shaanxi).
- Priest Saichō, patriarch of Tendai Buddhism, visits China and introduces tea to Japan on his return (or 804).

=== By topic ===
==== Religion ====
- The Palatine Chapel in Aachen (modern Germany) is consecrated by Pope Leo III.

== Births ==
- García Íñiguez I, king of Pamplona (approximate date)
- Louis the German, grandson of Charlemagne and first East frankish king. (Approximate date) (d. 876)
- Liudolf, duke of Saxony (approximate date)
- Lupus Servatus, Frankish abbot (approximate date)

== Deaths ==
- February 25 – De Zong, emperor of the Tang Dynasty (b. 742)
- May 12 – Æthelhard, archbishop of Canterbury
- Anselm, duke of Friuli (approximate date)
- Cernach mac Fergusa, king of South Brega (Ireland)
- Urbicius, Frankish monk (approximate date)
- Hui-kuo, Chinese Buddhist monk (b. 746)
- Jia Dan, general of the Tang Dynasty (b. 730)
- Muhammad al-Shaybani, Muslim jurist
- Wei Gao, general of the Tang Dynasty (b. 745)
