= Third Tikal–Calakmul War =

Military conflict

- Part of Tikal–Calakmul wars
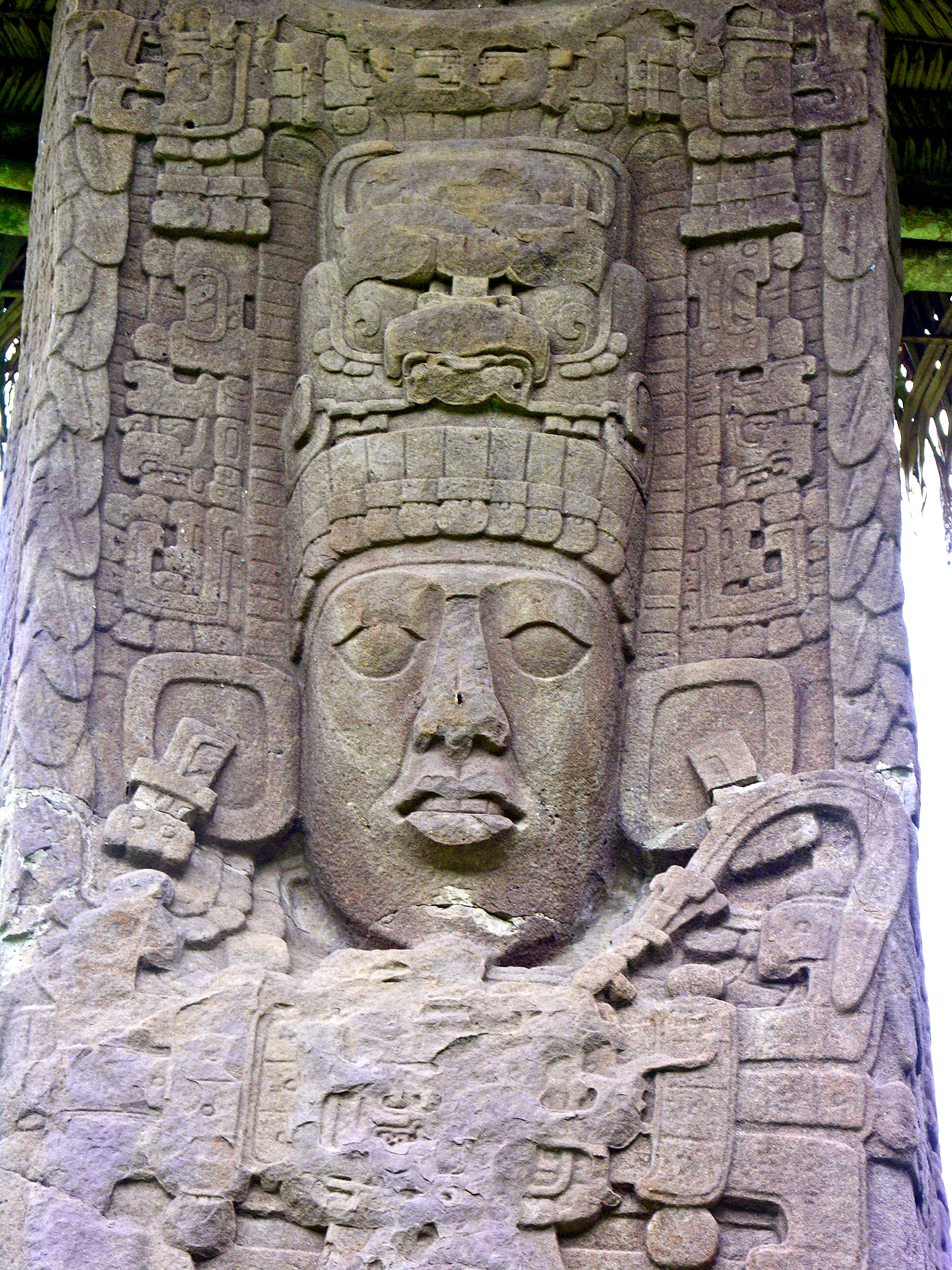
- K'ak' Tiliw Chan Yopaat, previously known as Cauac Sky, was the leader of Quiriguá's revolution against Copán
Date	720–744
Location	Guatemala and Honduras
Result	Tikal victory
Territorial changes	Quiriguá secedes from Copán and allies with Calakmul; Tikal takes El Peru and Naranjo from Calakmul

Belligerents
Tikal; Copán	Calakmul; Quiriguá

Commanders and leaders
Yikʼin Chan Kʼawiil; Uaxaclajuun Ubʼaah Kʼawiil †	Wamaw Kʼawiil; Kʼakʼ Tiliw Chan Yopaat

The Third Tikal–Calakmul War was the third in a series of wars between Tikal and Calakmul, (Tikal–Calakmul wars) two of the Major superpowers of the Maya Civilization during the classic period.

During the third war, the vassal state of Quiriguá played an important role when it declared independence from Copán, Tikal's closest ally in the south, and then allied itself with Calakmul.

== Before Quiriguá ==
After Calakmul's defeat in 695 (9.13.2.14.19 on the Maya calendar) violence continued between it and Tikal but for the most part died down. Then again in 720 (9.14.8.3.9) conflicts slowly started up.

Despite Tikal being more prosperous, Naranjo, Dos Pilas, and El Peru remained under Calakmul's control.

Between 733 and 736 Tikal imprisoned a noble from Calakmul after a victorious battle. His capture was commemorated by the building of an altar that has a sculpture of him bound by Tikal soldiers.

== Quiriguá's revolution ==
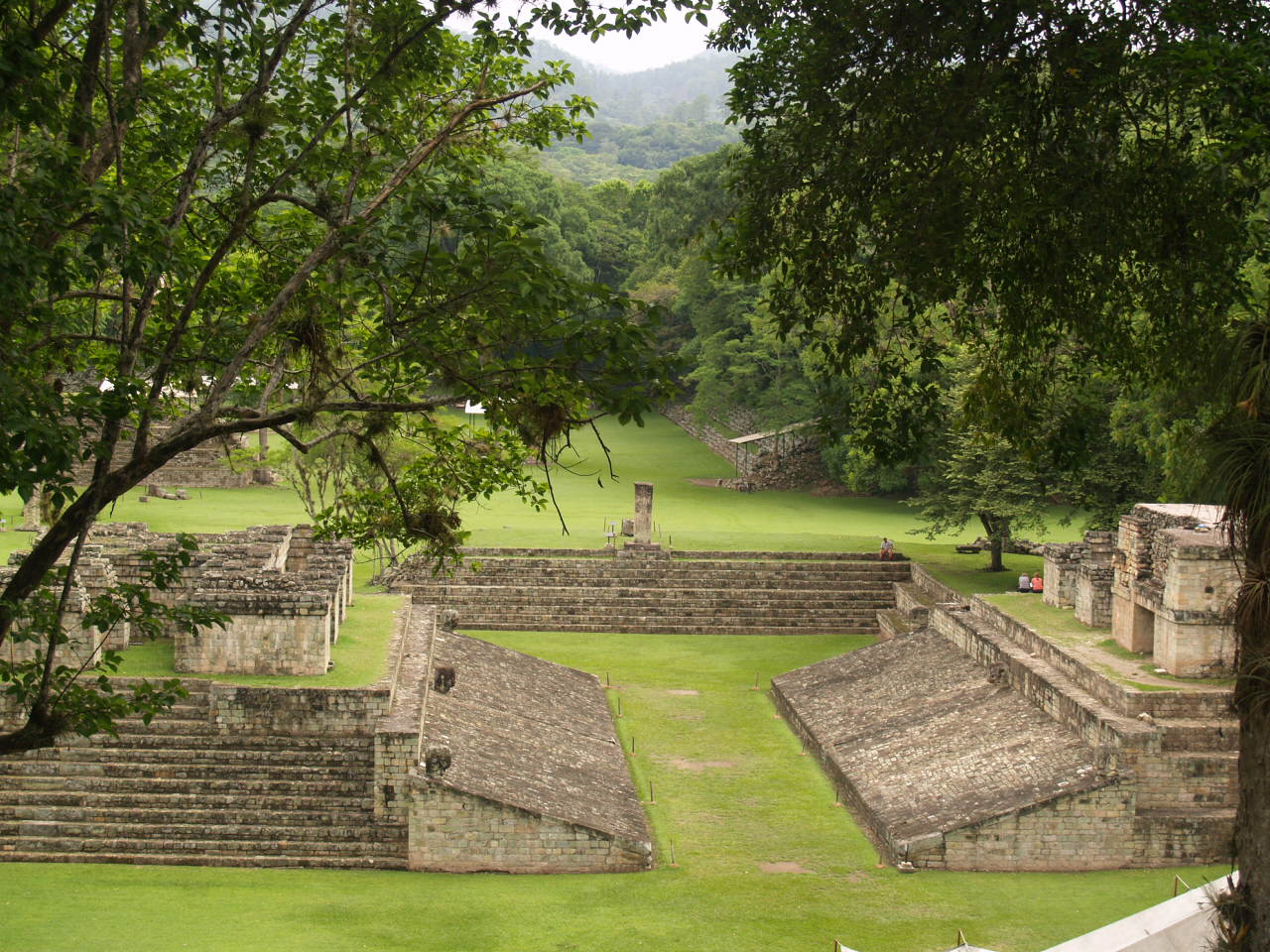
The ball court dedicated to Uaxaclajuun Ub'aah K'awiil after his death

Quiriguá was a small city in the south of the Maya area, which slowly grew to house 16,000 people. The city had long been a vassal of the larger Copán. In 724 (9.14.12.4.10), Uaxaclajuun Ub'aah K'awiil, Ajaw of Copán, installed K'ak' Tiliw Chan Yopaat as regional ruler of Quiriguá.

In 734 at Altar M in Quiriguá, K’ak Tiliw Chan Yopaat gave himself the title k’uhul ajaw, thus declaring Quiriguá’s independence from Copán. This led to a four-year revolutionary war. During this, in 736 (9.15.4.7.13), Wamaw K'awiil and several ambassadors from Calakmul met with K’ak Tiliw Chan Yopaat.

On April 27, 738, Uaxaclajuun Ub'aah K'awiil was captured by K'ak' Tiliw Chan Yopaat. Due to there having been no major battles around copán or Quiriguá it has been concluded that he was probably not captured in battle.

On 3 May, 738 (9.15.6.14.6), after a public trial and during a ritual, Uaxaclajuun Ub'aah K'awiil was decapitated by an axe, recorded as an "axe event".

== After Quiriguá's revolution ==
The southern Maya area

Though Quiriguá was to a certain extent a vassal of Calakmul it was never directly under Calakmul's control. At the same time Copán never attempted to re conquer Quiriguá because its leaders were afraid of the military power of Calakmul. The alliance was mutually beneficial to Quiriguá and Calakmul. Quiriguá's importance was mainly due to its position on several major trade routes.

in 743 El Peru was taken by Tikal and in 744 Naranjo was taken, destroying Calakmuls once powerful and extensive network of allies vassal states and trade networks.

== Aftermath ==
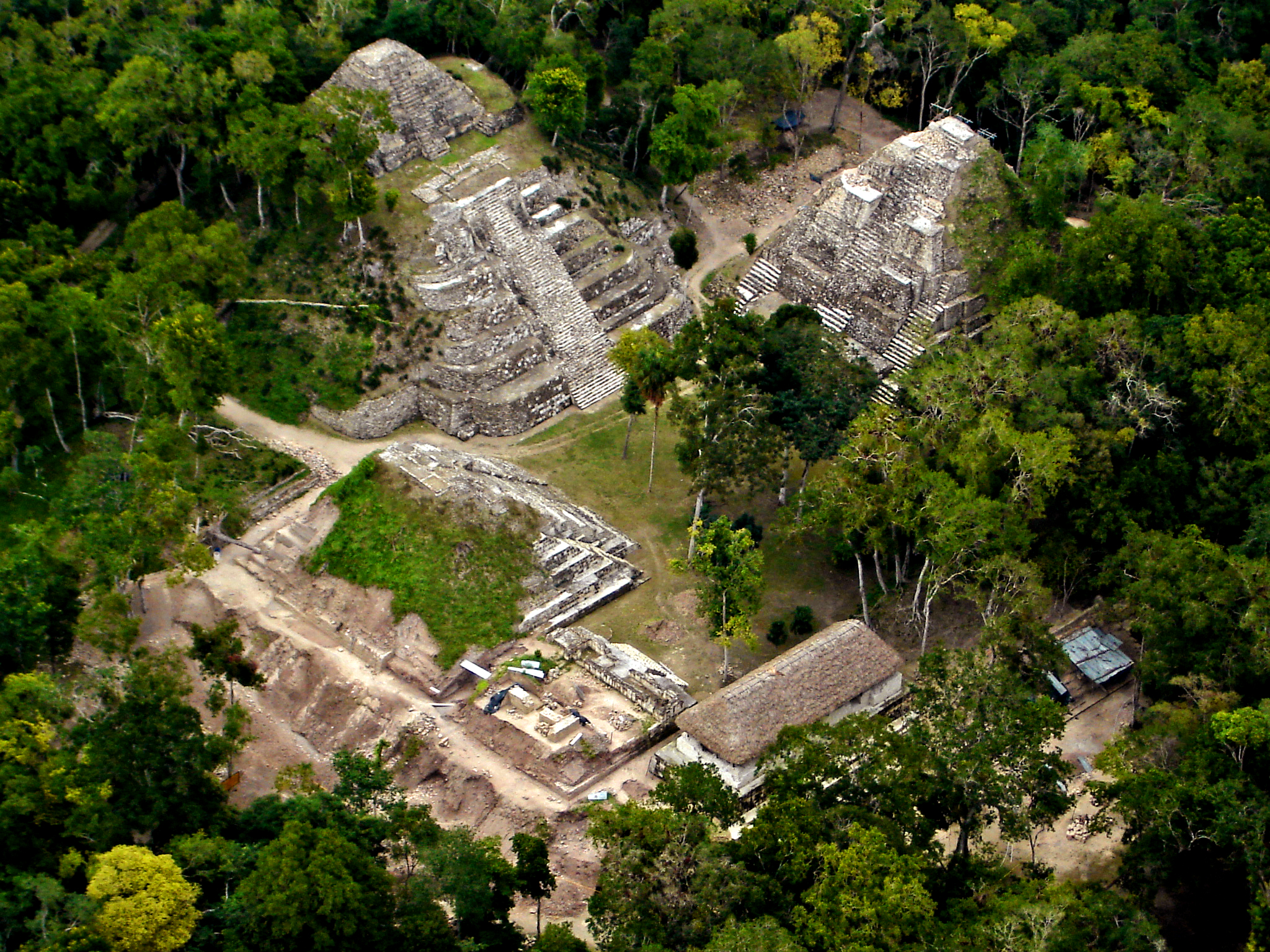
The north acropolis of Yaxha, Yaxha survived the initial collapse and then was less violently abandoned after 900

After 790, Calakmul lost most of its northern territories to nations on the Yucatán Peninsula.

In 810, three stele were raised in Calakmul. March 20 829 is 9.19.19.0.0 on the Maya calendar, the beginning of a new Winal. Normally, new stele would have been raised on this date, but none were. In 899 (possibly 909) the last stele record was raised in Calakmul. After this, a few more stele were raised, but these don't appear to include actual writing. Instead, they appear to be imitations from people trying to keep Maya tradition from disappearing. This was part of the Maya Collapse: Tikal and most of the other major cities of the time similarly experienced an extreme population decrease.
