= Amazigh nationalism =

The ethnic flag of the Imazighan

Rally of Amazighs in Yafran, Libya

The ethnic symbol of the Imazighan

Amazigh nationalism, also known as Berber nationalism, is an anti-colonial movement which calls for Amazigh self determination, and for the Amazigh people to reconnect with their history, culture and identity.

It can be found in medieval North Africa, specifically in medieval North African states such as the Zirids, Almohad Caliphate and the Barghawata State. In the modern era it originates in anti-colonialism, specifically in opposition and resistance against French colonialism by advocating for independence nationalism, reviving the tradition of resistance to foreigners, explicitly announcing armed struggle, and emphasizing the Amazigh historical and cultural identity of Northwest Africa.

Amazigh nationalism is becoming increasingly popular in North Africa especially in Algeria and Morocco. But also in areas such as Libya where local Amazigh armed resistance groups were founded and currently control areas such as Fezzan, Nafusa and Zuwara, however they are Libyan nationalists and see themselves as Libyans and Libya as Amazigh. Meanwhile in Agadaz and Azawad where Amazigh armed resistance groups have formed, they have declared independence through revolutions against the governments of Mali and Niger.

== Medieval ==
Amazigh nationalism can be found in the medieval era of North Africa, it has been expressed in many ways such as the Berber solidarity of the Zirids and calls by Zirid rulers such as Zawi Ziri for the Amazighs to unite. There is also Amazigh nationalism of the Almohad Caliphate which championed Amazigh nationalism and culture along with Islam. Finally there is also the Barghawata State who expressed Amazigh nationalism and even revived monotheist National Berber Religion but which was influenced by Islam.

=== Zirids ===
The Zirids along with other kingdoms in Iberia of North African ancestry, expressed Amazigh solidarity with the Zirids calling for the Amazighs to unite, specifically during Zirid rule in Al-Andalus under Zirid leaders such as Zawi and Badis. While Zawi, who was the leader of the Amazigh faction in the civil war of Al-Andalus and the Zirid ruler of Granada, was addressing group of Amazighs, he proclaimed to them "Oh Berbers. If you unite, you cannot be overcome, and if you scatter, you will not remain. The community is after you, so look after yourselves and hurry".

The new Zirid leader in Al-Andalus and ruler of Granada, named Badis, who assumed leadership of the Amazighs in Al-Andalus, also expressed Amazigh nationalism as he united and was supported by the Amazighs of Al-Andalus with the aim of supporting Amazigh leadership and authority in Southern Iberia. These Amazighs despite their differences in opinion and ideology, were supportive and mutually aided against any others who were against the Amazighs.

=== Almohad Caliphate ===
The Almohad Caliphate championed Amazigh nationalism but in addition to religion. Ibn Tumart, the founder of the Almohad movement who led a revolt against the Almoravids, in which the Almohads under the first Almohad Caliph Al-Kumi eventually overthrew the Almoravids. Ibn Tumart has translated the Quran into Tamazight, which is the language of the Amazighs, and had the call to prayer proclaimed in Tamazight instead of Arabic. The Almohad movement was not just religious one but an Amazigh nationalist one.

=== Barghawata ===
The Kingdom of Barghawata, also practiced Amazigh nationalism and even revived a monotheist National Berber Religion which was influenced by Islam. Which was founded by Tarif Amatghar (also known as Tarif Matghari) who took part in the Berber-Fihrid War, who came from the same tribe as the first Berber Caliph during the Berber Revolt, Maysara Matghari.

The people of the Kingdom of Barghawata practiced a monotheist Berber religion which worshipped one God called Yakush and Yush in Tamazight, the Amazigh God who had been worshipped by them since the Bronze Age, the monotheist religion of the Amazighs in the Kingdom of the Barghawata was also influenced by Islam. The Prophet of this Berber religion was Salih Matghari who was the son of Tarif Amatghar, the founder of the Barghawata State.

== Modern ==
=== Algeria ===
In the modern era, Amazigh nationalism in Algeria developed in the fight against French colonialism. Amazigh nationalists were driven by nationalism in which they called for Algerian independence and for Algerians to reconnect with their Amazigh ancestry specifically Amazigh history, culture and identity. Amazigh nationalists also revived the traditions of Amazigh culture specifically this time against the French colonial empire, where the Amazigh nationalists called for resistance to foreigners and armed struggle while emphasizing Amazigh history and culture in North Africa. However after the Algerian War of Independence, the new leaders of the FLN (which became the main and ruling party of Algeria) decided to abandon and purge any forms of Amazighism or Amazigh nationalism, in favour of Arabism. Victims of this purge including the Amazighist, Hocine Ayt Ahmad, one of the founders of the FLN.

In the 21st century, Algeria has found a surge in Amazigh nationalism where even though it is still expressed more in language and culture than politics, it has still found itself in Algerian politics. Statements by Algerian Presidents such as Bouteflika and Tebboune have promoted Berberism in Algeria, stating that "Algeria is Amazigh but was Arabized by Islam" and that "We are all Amazigh, Arabized due to Islam". Ben Bella who was the President of Algeria after the Algerian War of Independence, had originally proclaimed in 1962 that "We are Arabs, we are Arabs, we are Arabs" however twenty years later in 1982 he changed his mind and stated that "I am Amazigh, the man speaking to you, Ben Bella, is Amazigh".

Many other Algerian presidents, ministers and officials of both the Algerian Government and the FLN would continue this same theme, such as Ahmad Talib Ibrahimi (Minister in the Algerian Government) who said "To say that Algeria is populated by Arabs and Berbers is a myth of the century. All Algerians are Berbers, more or less Arabized, and when the French studied this demographic, they realized they couldn't touch Berber identity, while language and religion could be suppressed, and they were, in the hope of Frenchifying and Christianizing Algeria" and Ferhat Abbas (First President of Algeria during the Algerian War of Independence) who said that "Historically we are Arabized Berbers, Arab-Berbers among which Berber ancestry dominates".

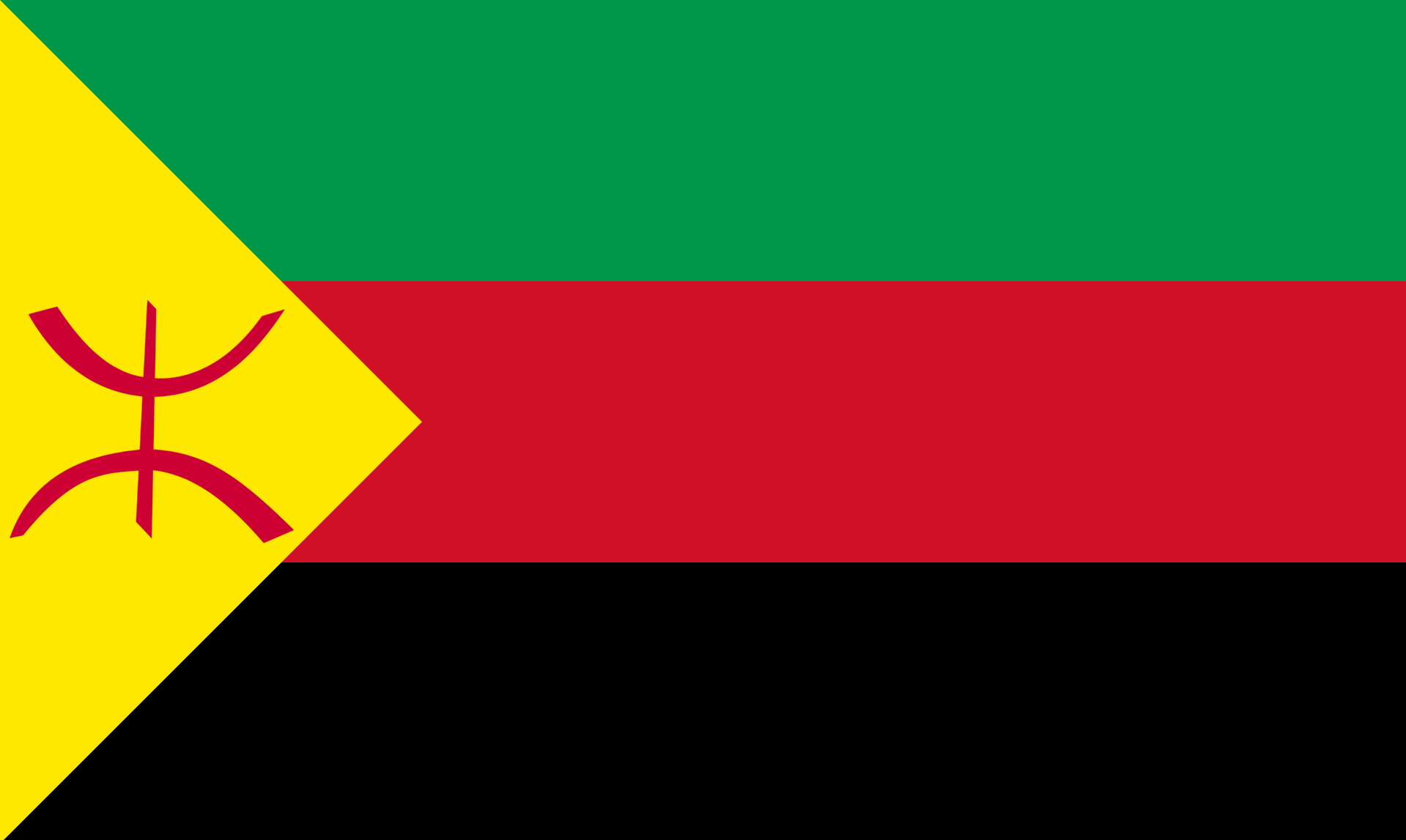
Flag flown by Azawad revolutionaries

=== Azawad ===
In the modern era, militant Amazigh nationalism has grown as Amazighs have also taken up armed resistance and revolutions in order to achieve self-determination especially Sahara. Examples include the Kawsan revolt against the French colonial empire by the Tuaregs in Ayr Mountains and the multiple revolutions against the governments of Mali and Niger. Currently, Amazigh nationalism has shown some results in the form Amazigh states such as Azawad have declared independence through revolutions by Amazigh nationalists against government of Mali.

=== Libya ===
Similarly to Azawad, Amazigh nationalism became militant in Libya starting with the Libyan revolution in 2011, which saw multiple Amazigh resistance groups form against Gadaffi, with displays of Amazigh nationalist symbolism. Amazigh nationalist groups took control of areas of Western Libya, specifically the areas Nafusa, Fezzan and Zuwara, with demands that the Amazigh identity be included in the Libyan constitution

=== Morocco ===
With Morocco gaining independence from France in 1956, it created a new political situation in Morocco which allowed for Amazigh nationalism to make its appearance. Amazigh nationalists and Amazighists usually oppose Arabization and Pan-Arabism in Morocco. Although the militant Amazigh nationalism that grew up among Algerian exiles, and in Algeria itself, did not spread to Morocco, there was an Amazigh cultural revival and Amazigh intellectuals began reading Tamazight, and creating a written literature. A Moroccan resident in Holland even developed a word-processing package that used the ancient alphabet and scripture of the Amazighs which is known as Tifinagh. This Amazigh revival was mostly from the Moroccan middle class.

Amazighism in Morocco, also draws a lot of inspiration from Amazigh nationalism. However Amazigh nationalism both similar but different in Morocco from other countries. Like Amazigh nationalism in other North African states, it does not view the Imazighan as a distinct people from their nation-state, and that Amazighness is within the national identity of Morocco. However unlike other North African states it bases it also on the Islamic faith and allegiance to the King.

== See also ==
- Berberism
- Berber Revolt
- Algerian nationalism
- Moroccan nationalism
