= 740 =

Calendar year

740 in various calendars
- Gregorian calendar: 740; DCCXL
- Ab urbe condita: 1493
- Armenian calendar: 189; ԹՎ ՃՁԹ
- Assyrian calendar: 5490
- Balinese saka calendar: 661–662
- Bengali calendar: 146–147
- Berber calendar: 1690
- Buddhist calendar: 1284
- Burmese calendar: 102
- Byzantine calendar: 6248–6249
- Chinese calendar: 己卯年 (Earth Rabbit); 3437 or 3230 — to — 庚辰年 (Metal Dragon); 3438 or 3231
- Coptic calendar: 456–457
- Discordian calendar: 1906
- Ethiopian calendar: 732–733
- Hebrew calendar: 4500–4501
- Hindu calendars
- Vikram Samvat: 796–797
- Shaka Samvat: 661–662
- Kali Yuga: 3840–3841
- Holocene calendar: 10740
- Iranian calendar: 118–119
- Islamic calendar: 122–123
- Japanese calendar: Tenpyō 12 (天平１２年)
- Javanese calendar: 633–635
- Julian calendar: 740; DCCXL
- Korean calendar: 3073
- Minguo calendar: 1172 before ROC 民前1172年
- Nanakshahi calendar: −728
- Seleucid era: 1051/1052 AG
- Thai solar calendar: 1282–1283
- Tibetan calendar: ས་མོ་ཡོས་ལོ་ (female Earth-Hare); 866 or 485 or −287 — to — ལྕགས་ཕོ་འབྲུག་ལོ་ (male Iron-Dragon); 867 or 486 or −286

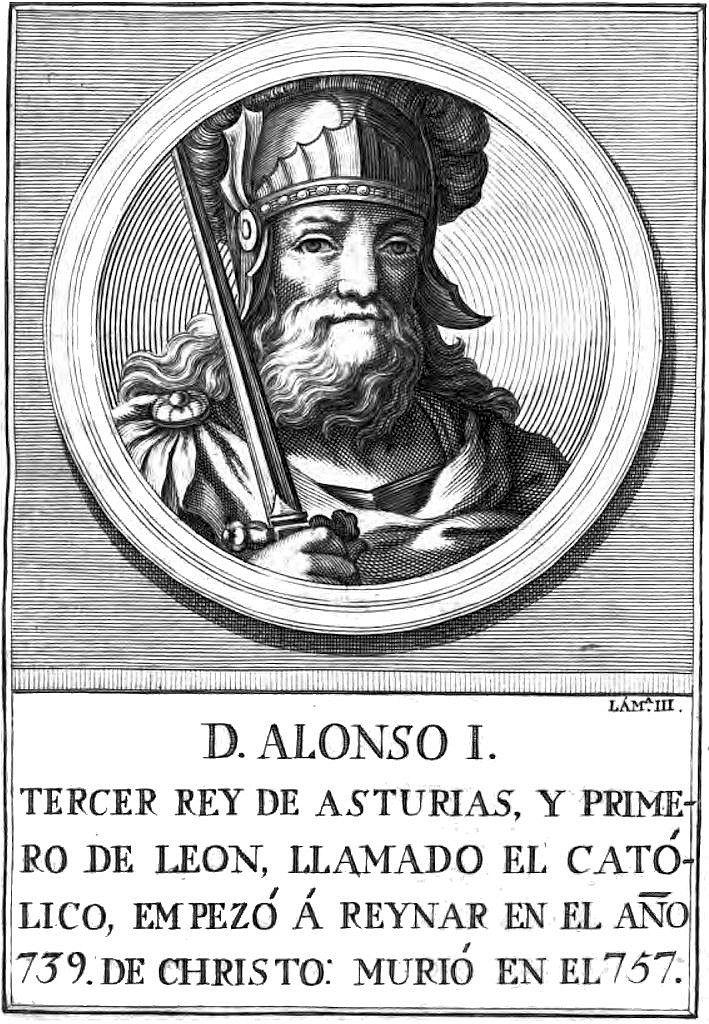
King Alfonso I of Asturias (Spain)

Map showing major events of the Fujiwara no Hirotsugu Rebellion (740)

Year 740 (DCCXL) was a leap year starting on Friday of the Julian calendar, the 740th year of the Common Era (CE) and Anno Domini (AD) designations, the 740th year of the 1st millennium, the 40th year of the 8th century, and the 1st year of the 740s decade. The denomination 740 for this year has been used since the early medieval period, when the Anno Domini calendar era became the prevalent method in Europe for naming years.

== Events ==
=== By place ===
==== Byzantine Empire ====
- Battle of Akroinon: Following the disastrous Battle of Sebastopolis (see 692), Emperor Leo III has largely confined himself to a defensive strategy, while the Umayyad armies regularly launch raids into Byzantine-held Anatolia. Caliph Hisham ibn Abd al-Malik assembles an expeditionary force (90,000 men) under his son Sulayman ibn Hisham. One of these armies, 20,000 men strong under Abdallah al-Battal, is defeated at Akroinon (modern-day Afyon) by the Byzantines, led by Leo and his son, the future emperor Constantine V. About 6,800 Muslim Arabs, however, resist and manage to conduct an orderly retreat to Synnada (Phrygia).
- October 26 – 740 Constantinople earthquake. An earthquake strikes Constantinople and the surrounding countryside, causing destruction to the city's land walls and buildings.

==== Europe ====
- The Berber tribes in the recently conquered region of Galicia (northwest Spain) rebel. This facilitates the establishment of an independent kingdom in the Cantabrian Mountains under King Alfonso I of Asturias.
- Duke Thrasimund II recovers the duchy of Spoleto and kills Hilderic with Papal-Beneventian aid. He does not return the confiscated papal cities, and his alliance with Pope Gregory III ruptures.
- December – King Liutprand of the Lombards attempts to counter the growing independence of the Lombard duchies in southern Italy.
- Sicily, Sardinia, Provence, and Greece are raided by a fleet of Arab Muslim ships sent by the governor of Ifriqya, the ones raiding South Western Europe are led by Habīb Ibn Abi ‘Ubayda Al-Fihrī, while the fleet raiding Greece is led by Mu’awiya ibn Hishām. All of them are successful, submitting the Islands and returning with much wealth from the spoils of war.

==== Britain ====
- King Eadberht of Northumbria marches his army north to attack the Picts. King Æthelbald of Mercia takes advantage of his absence, and ravages the city of York. Internal struggles re-emerge in Northumbria with the murder of Eardwine, probably the son of the late usurping king Eadwulf I.
- King Æthelheard of Wessex dies after a 14-year reign. He is succeeded by his brother (and probably distant relative) Cuthred. Æthelbald of Mercia takes control of Berkshire from Wessex.

==== Africa ====
- Battle of the Nobles: The Berber rebels under chieftain Khalid ibn Hamid al-Zanati defeat and overwhelm the Umayyad forces of Khalid ibn Abi Habib al-Fihri, near Tangier (Northern Morocco), undermining Arab domination in Islamic North Africa. The rebellion spreads in Al-Andalus (Spain), causing governor Ubayd Allah ibn al-Habhab to withdraw Moorish troops from many garrisons north of the Pyrenees.

==== Asia ====
- Much to the delight of the citizens of Chang'an, the Chinese government of the Tang dynasty orders fruit trees to be planted along every main avenue of the city, which enriches not only the diets of the people but also the surroundings (approximate date)
- Fujiwara no Hirotsugu Rebellion: The Fujiwara clan led by Fujiwara no Hirotsugu, dissatisfied with the political powers in Japan, raise an army in Dazaifa (Kyushu) but are defeated by government forces.
- The Japanese imperial capital is moved from Heijō-kyō to Kuni-kyō.

=== By topic ===
==== Religion ====
- The Khazars, a nation of the Black Sea steppe, though not ethnically Jewish, voluntarily convert to Judaism.
- Cuthbert becomes archbishop of Canterbury after the death of Nothhelm (see 739).

== Births ==
- Aurelius, king of Asturias (approximate date)
- Gao Ying, chancellor of the Tang dynasty (d. 811)
- Layman Pang, Chinese Chán (Zen) Buddhist (d. 808)
- Mashallah ibn Athari, Jewish-Arab astrologer (d. 815)
- Waldo of Reichenau, Frankish abbot (approximate date)
- Theoctista, politically influential Byzantine woman (d. 802)

== Deaths ==
- Abdallah al-Battal, Arab general
- Æthelburg, queen of Wessex
- Æthelheard, king of Wessex
- Æthelwold, bishop of Lindisfarne
- Acca, bishop of Hexham (or 742)
- Anna, Byzantine princess and empress, wife of Artabasdos
- Frithugyth, queen of Wessex
- Gregory, duke of Benevento
- Hilderic, duke of Spoleto
- Khalid ibn Abi Habib al-Fihri, Arab general
- Maysara al-Matghari, Berber rebel leader
- Meng Haoran, Chinese poet
- Rhain ap Cadwgan, king of Dyfed and Brycheiniog
- Uqba ibn al-Hajjaj, Arab governor
- Zayd ibn Ali, Arab imam and grandson of Husayn ibn Ali (b. 695)
- Zhang Jiuling, chancellor of the Tang dynasty (b. 673)
