= Battle of Tilimsan =

- Part of Berber Revolt
Date	740
Location	Tilimsan, North Africa
Result	Berber victory
Territorial changes	Tilimsan is retaken by the Berbers

Belligerents
Berbers	Umayyad Caliphate

Commanders and leaders
Unknown	Abd al-Rahman ibn al-Mughira al-Abdari

Strength
Unknown	Unknown

Casualties and losses
Unknown	Unknown

The Battle of Tilimsan or the Revolt of Tilimsan was an uprising by the Berbers against the Umayyad occupation of Tilimsan in 740. This came at the early stages of the Berber Revolt, in which the Berbers within the city of Tilimsan drove out the Umayyad occuppiers led by Abd al-Rahmàn b. al-Mughira al-'Abdari.

== Background ==
The Berber Revolt had been in its early stages when Ibn al-Habhab sent ‘Abd al-Rahmàn b. al-Mughira al-'Abdari, to prevent the Berber armies from advancing east and hold Tilimsan which was now on the front line of the war.

== Battle ==
However, Abd al-Rahmàn began the to slaughter the Berbers within Tilimsan, specifically the Sufris. He may have had trouble distinguishing the Sufris from the rest of the Berbers, and he earned the nickname "the Butcher". The Berbers within Tilimsan then rebelled against the Umayyad occupation, driving them out of city.

== Aftermath ==
By this time, Ibn al-Habhab had returned from Sicily and reached the surroundings of Tilimsan, where he stayed camped on the river near Tilimsan, from which he stayed on the river near for the rest of Ibn al-Habhab's governorship. It was clear by then the Arabs were tired of dealing with the Berber Revolt, they were tired of the aggressive policy that had brought them nothing but severe losses. Ibn al-Habhab then found Musa ibn Abi Khalid, who was the servant of Mu'àwiya ibn Hudayj, who had gathered around him the surviving forces loyal to the caliphate in the area, apparently after the expulsion of Abd al-Rahman al-Abdari a short time before. Despite Musa show of loyalty, Ibn al-Habhab accused him of treason and cut off his hand and leg.
