= Ruk =

Ruk or RUK may refer to:

== Places ==
- Rük, Azerbaijan
- Reserve Officer School, Finland (Finnish: Reserviupseerikoulu)
- Rest of the UK (rUK), the United Kingdom excluding Scotland

== Other uses ==
- Ruk (area), measuring of land
- Reform UK, a British political party (formed 2018)
- Ruk, an android character in the Star Trek episode "What Are Little Girls Made Of?"
