= Tarif =

Tarif may refer to:

== Places ==
- Tarif Kalba, a settlement in Sharjah Emirate, UAE
- Tarif, a settlement in Emirate of Abu Dhabi, UAE
- El-Tarif, ancient Egyptian necropolis near Luxor, Egypt

== People ==
=== Given name ===
- Tarif Ahmed (born 1985), Indian footballer
- Tarif Akhand (born 1998), Indian footballer
- Tarif Khalidi (born 1938), Palestinian historian
- Tarif ibn Malik, Moroccan Berber commander
- Tarif al-Matghari (died 744), founder of the Berber Barghawata dynasty in the Tamesna region in Morocco
- Tarif Singh (born 1943), Indian politician

=== Surname ===
- Mowafaq Tarif (born 1963), Druze Israeli spiritual leader
- Salah Tarif (born 1954), Druze Israeli politician
- Salih ibn Tarif, the second king of the Berghouata Berber kingdom

== See also ==
- Tariff (disambiguation)
- Tahrif, a Muslim belief in corruption of the Bible
- Tarifa, a Spanish municipality
