= Fatimid campaigns in the western Maghreb (958–960) =

10th-century conquest

- Part of the Fatimid Caliphate's expansion
Date	958–960
Location	western Algeria and Morocco
Result	Fatimid victory
Territorial changes	Conquest of Fez and Sijilmasa; Fatimid realm expanded to the Atlantic

Belligerents
Fatimid Caliphate	Caliphate of Cordoba (nominally); Emirate of Sijilmasa

Commanders and leaders
Ziri ibn Manad; Jawhar	Emir of Fez (POW); Ibn Wasul (POW)

The Fatimid campaigns in the western Maghreb were led by the Fatimid general Jawhar and Ziri ibn Manad between 958 and 960. They were directed against the rulers who had recognised the suzerainty of the Caliph of Cordoba.

== Background ==
After the end of Idrisid rule in Fez one of the princes established himself in the Rif in the 930s, he recognised the authority of the Fatimids until his death in 948. In the 950s northern present-day Morocco was transformed into an Umayyad protectorate.

== Siege ==
In 958 Jawhar occupied Sijilmasa after which its ruler Ibn Wasul evacuated the city, however he was delivered to Jawhar and the coins in his mint were struck in the name of the Fatimid Caliph. In the winter of 958 Ziri ibn Manad directed a siege against Fez and in November 959 he overcame the walls of Fez, two days after he captured the emir and took him prisoner. Fez and Sijilmasa were captured and the Fatimid realm was extended to the Atlantic. The amir of Fez and Ibn Wasul of Sijilmasa were brought along in cages and the Idrisids were forced to provide hostages. After this expedition only Tangier and Ceuta were held by the Caliph of Cordoba.

== Aftermath ==
In 973 the Umayyad general Ghalib invaded Morocco, he reasserted Umayyad suzerainty in Morocco by conquering Fez and forcing the Banu Gannun to switch their allegiance from the Fatimids to the Umayyads.

== Sources ==
- Brett, Michael (2001). The Rise of the Fatimids: The World of the Mediterranean and the Middle East in the Fourth Century of the Hijra, Tenth Century CE. The Medieval Mediterranean. Vol. 30. Leiden, Boston, Köln: Brill. ISBN 90-04-11741-5.
- Halm, Heinz (1991). Das Reich des Mahdi: Der Aufstieg der Fatimiden [The Empire of the Mahdi: The Rise of the Fatimids] (in German). Munich: C. H. Beck. ISBN 978-3-406-35497-7.
