= Al Mujafaf (village) =

Coordinates: 30°42′00″N 31°29′11″E

Al Mujafaf المجفف
- Village
- Interactive map of Al Mujafaf
- Country: Egypt
- Governorate: Sharqia Governorate
- Markaz (district): Diyarb Negm

Population (2006)
  - Total: 9,039
- Time zone: UTC+2 (EET)
  - Summer (DST): UTC+3 (EEST)

Al Mujafaf (Arabic: المجفف) is a village in the Markaz (district) of Diyarb Negm, Sharqia Governorate, Egypt. According to the 2006 census, Al Mujafaf had a population of 9,039, comprising 4,484 men and 4,555 women.

== History ==
Al Mujafaf is an ancient village originally known as Talal Al-Zayyatin. It was first recorded by this name in the al-Rawk al-Salahi (Salahi Cadastre), a survey documented by Ibn Mammati in his book Qawanin al-Dawawin (The Canons of Diwans), and was still known as such during the subsequent al-Rauk al-Nasiri (Nasiri Cadastre) recorded by Ibn Al-Jiaan in his book Al-Tuhfa al-Saniyya bi Asma' al-Bilad al-Misriyya (The Precious Gift of the Names of Egyptian Lands).

During the Ottoman era, the village was referred to both as Talal Al-Zayyatin and as its alternative name, Al Mujafaf. This was noted in an Ottoman land survey from the reign of Sultan Suleiman the Magnificent, conducted by governor Hadım Suleiman Pasha. The name was officially standardized to 'Al Mujafaf' in 1813 AD (1228 AH) following a national village survey under the rule of Muhammad Ali Pasha.

== See also ==
- Sharqia Governorate
