= Barghawata =

Berber tribal confederation in Morocco

Barghawata Confederacy Buṛɣwaṭa ⵉⴱⵔⵖⵡⴰⵟⵏ
- 744–1058
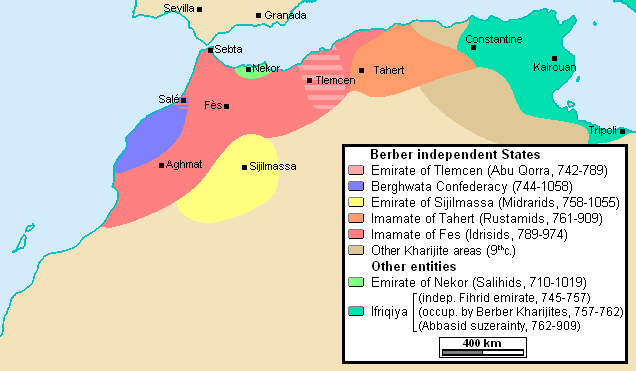
- Map of Northwest Africa following the Berber Revolt.
- Common languages: Berber (Lisan al-Gharbi)
- Religion: Official : Islam-influenced Traditional Berber religion (adopted by 12 tribes); Other : Islam (Khariji)(adopted by 17 tribes)
- Government: Monarchy; Tribal confederacy (29 tribes)
- King
  - 744: Tarif Ametghari
  - 961: Abu Mansur Isa
- Historical era: Middle Ages
  - Berber Revolt: 740–743
  - Established: 744
  - Disestablished: 1058
Preceded by	Succeeded by
Umayyad Caliphate	Almoravid dynasty
- Today part of: Morocco

The Barghawatas, also known as Barghwata or Berghouata (Berber languages: Buṛɣwaṭa) were a Berber tribal confederation and religious movement that ruled a region of the Atlantic coast in present-day Morocco between the 8th and 11th centuries. They belonged to the Masmuda confederacy.

After allying with the Sufri rebellion against the Umayyad Caliphate, they established an independent state (AD 744-1058) in the area of Tamesna on the Atlantic coast between Safi and Salé under the leadership of Tarif al-Matghari.

== Etymology ==
Some historians believe that the term Barghawata is a phonetic deformation of the term Barbati, a nickname which Tarif carried. It is thought that he was born in the area of Barbate, near Cádiz in Spain. However, Jérôme Carcopino and other historians think the name is much older and the tribe is the same as that which the Romans called Baquates, who up until the 7th century lived near Volubilis.

== History ==
Few details are known about Barghawata. Most of the historical sources are largely posterior to their rule and often present a contradictory and confused historical context. However, one tradition appears more interesting. It comes from Córdoba in Spain and its author is the Large Prior of Barghawata and the Barghawata ambassador to Córdoba Abu Salih Zammur, around the middle of the 10th century. This tradition is regarded as most detailed concerning Barghwata. It was reported by Al Bakri, Ibn Hazm and Ibn Khaldun, although their interpretations comprise some divergent points of view.

The Barghawatas, along with the Ghomara and the Miknasa, launched the Berber Revolt of 739 or 740. They were fired up by Sufri Kharijite preachers, a Muslim sect that embraced a doctrine representing total egalitarianism in opposition to the aristocracy of the Quraysh which had grown more pronounced under the Umayyad Caliphate. The rebels elected Maysara al-Matghari to lead their revolt, and successfully seized control of nearly all of what is now Morocco, inspiring further rebellions in the Maghreb and al-Andalus. At the Battle of Bagdoura, the rebels annihilated a particularly strong army dispatched by the Umayyad caliph from Syria. But the rebels army itself was eventually defeated in the outskirts Kairouan, Ifriqiya in 741. In the aftermath, the rebel alliance dissolved. Even before this denouement, the Barghawatas, as founders of the revolt, had grown resentful of the attempt by later adherents, notably the Zenata chieftains, in alliance with the increasingly authoritarian Sufri commissars, to take control of the leadership of the rebellion. As their primary objective – the liberation of their people from Umayyad rule – had already been achieved, and there was little prospect of it ever being re-imposed, the Barghwata saw little point in continued military campaigns. In 742 or 743, the Barghwata removed themselves from the rebel alliance, and retreated to the Tamesna region, on the Atlantic coast of Morocco, where they founded their new independent state and abandoned their Sufri Kharijitism.

The Barghawatas ruled in the Tamesna region for more than three centuries (744–1058). Under the successors of Salih ibn Tarif, Ilyas ibn Salih (792–842); Yunus (842–888) and Abu Ghufail (888–913) the tribal kingdom was consolidated, and missions sent to neighbouring tribes. After initially good relations with the Umayyad Caliphate of Cordoba there was a break at the end of the 10th century. Two Umayyad incursions, as well as attacks by the Fatimids were fought off by the Barghawata. From the 11th century there was an intensive guerrilla war with the Banu Ifran. Even though the Barghawata were subsequently much weakened, they were still able to fend off Almoravid attacks—the spiritual leader of the Almoravids, Abdallah ibn Yasin, fell in battle against them on 7 July 1058. Only in 1149 were the Barghawata eliminated by the Almohads as a political and religious group.

== Religion ==
The Barghawata Kingdom practiced a monotheistic Berber religion centered on the worship of an ancient Bronze Age Libyan deity known as Yakush and Yush. This religion blended indigenous Berber beliefs with elements of Islam, notably the recognition of the prophethood of Muhammad and various Biblical figures.

According to medieval sources, Salih ibn Tarif claimed to have received a sacred scripture revealed by God. This text consisted of 80 chapters, although virtually nothing of its contents survives beyond the titles of a few chapters, such as Surat Yunus. Al-Bakri describes it as containing a mixture of historical narratives and religious laws.

Al-Bakri also records aspects of Barghawata worship. During prayer, believers placed one hand over the other and began with the Medieval Berber invocation "a bis(a)m an Yakūš" ("In the name of God"), followed by "muqqar Yakūš" ("God is Great"). They then recited half of their sacred text before proclaiming: "God is above us; nothing on earth or in heaven is hidden from Him." Afterward, they repeated "God is Great" twenty-five times, followed by "īḥan Yaqūš" ("God is Unique") the same number of times. The prayer concluded with "war dā am Yakūš", meaning "There is none like God."

Al-Bakri further reports that Barghawata religious law permitted unlimited polygamy and unrestricted divorce while prohibiting incest up to the third cousin and marriage with foreigners, particularly Arabs. He also records several distinctive religious taboos, including prohibitions against eating eggs, animal heads, and fish that had not been ritually slaughtered. Chicken was regarded as unclean and could only be eaten in times of famine.

Regarding judicial law, Al-Bakri states that thieves and adulterers were punished by death, while liars were exiled. He also reports that the prescribed blood price (diyah) for homicide was one hundred cows for a single human life.

It is possible that the Barghawata had a Judeo-Berber background, though accounts of entire Berber tribes practicing Judaism appear later and are unreliable.

== Tribes ==
The Barghawata confederacy was made of 29 tribes. 12 of these tribes adopted the Barghawata religion while 17 adhered to Islam.

Barghawata religion (syncretic with Islam) tribes

- Gerawa
- Zouagha
- Branès
- Banu Abi Nacer
- Menjasa
- Banu Abi Nuh
- Banu Waghmar
- Matghara
- Banu Borgh
- Banu Derr
- Matmata
- Banu Zaksent

Khariji Muslim tribes

- Zenata-Jbal
- Banu Bellit
- Nemala
- Ounsent
- Banu Ifren
- Banu Naghit
- Banu Nuaman
- Banu Fallusa
- Banu Kuna
- Banu Sebker
- Assada
- Regana
- Azmin
- Manada
- Masina
- Resana
- Trara

Some constituent tribes, such as Branès, Matmata, Ifren and Trara, were fractions of much larger tribal groups, and only the Tamesna-based fractions joined the Barghawata Confederacy.

== Barghawata rulers ==
- Salih ibn Tarif (744-?), he declared himself a prophet in 744 and left to the east at the age of 47, promising to return.
- Ilyas ibn Salih (792/?-842), he is said to have professed Islam publicly but Salih's religion secretly, and died in the 50th year of his reign.
- Yunus ibn Ilyas (842/?-888), he made Salih's religion official and fought those who would not convert (killing 7770 people, according to Ibn Khaldun's sources, some at a place called Tamlukeft). Yunus is also said to have performed the Hajj. He died in the 44th year of his reign.
- Abu-Ghufayl Muhammad (888/?-917), a great-grandson of Salih ibn Tarif, Abu Ghufayl may also have been called a prophet (according to a poem Ibn-Khaldun cites) and had 44 wives and more sons. He died in the 29th year of his reign.
- Abu al-Ansar Abdullah (917/?-961), he was a powerful and respected monarch. He died in the 44th year of his reign, and was buried at Ameslakht.
- Abu Mansur Isa (961/?-?), he was 22 years old when he became king.
- Abu Hafs Abdullah (?-1058), a descendent of Abu Mansur Isa, was the last ruler of Barghwata.

== See also ==
- Emirate of Nekor
- Maghrawa
- Banu Ifran
