= Gara Medouar =

Rock formation in Morocco

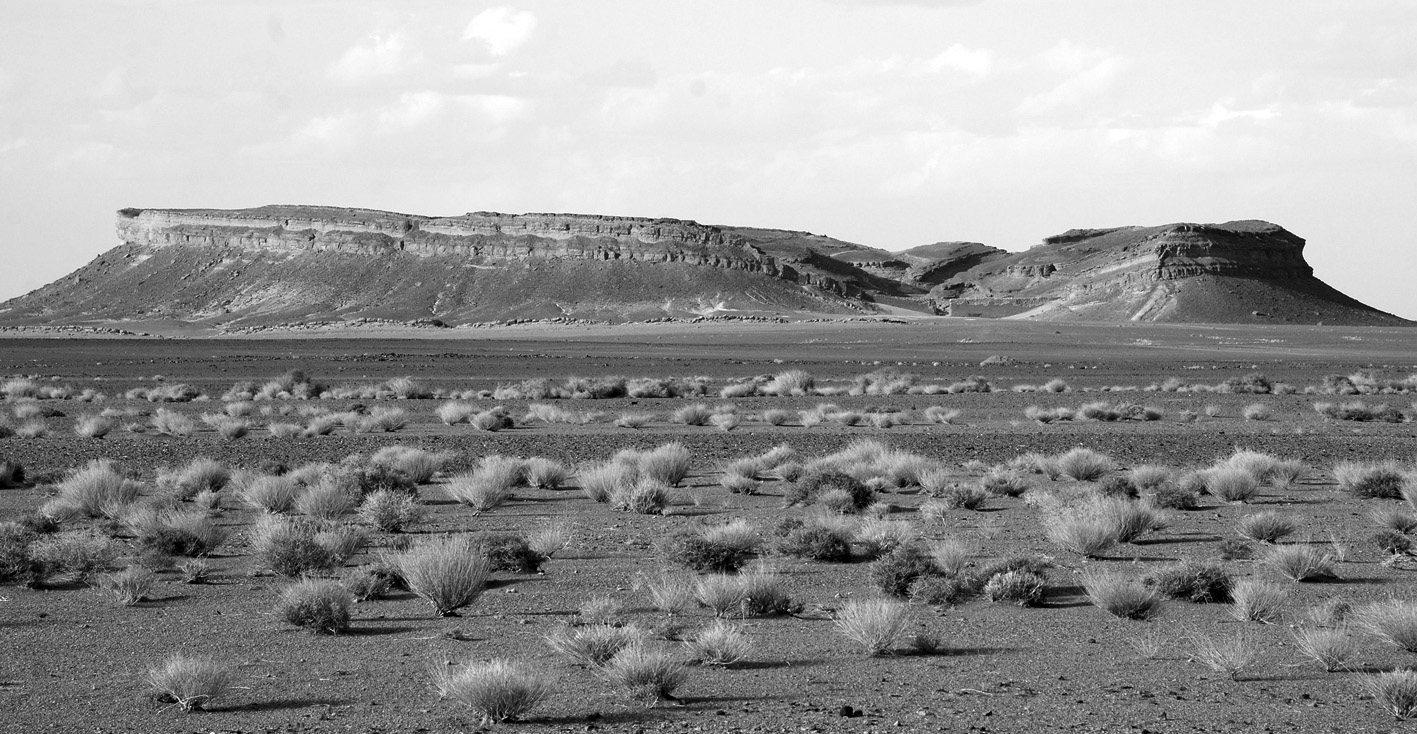
- View from the south-west

Highest point
- Elevation: 50 m (160 ft)
- Coordinates: 31°18′03″N 04°24′02″W

Geography
- Location within Morocco Location within Africa
- Location: Sijilmasa

Gara Medouar, also known as Jebel Mudawwar ("round mountain"), Gara Mdouar or Mdoura, is a horseshoe-shaped geological formation ("erosion cirque") near Sijilmasa, Morocco. In the 11th century it was developed into a fortress with a military garrison that likely protected the nearby trade city of Sijilmasa, where gold coins were minted, and the trade routes from the south. Representatives of the Almoravid dynasty likely had the fortifications built, which included a wall of up to 12 metres high that closed off the only opening to the massif, two walls and defensive structures along the mountains, dams in the canyons to collect water, and a variety of structures on the plateaus.

The massif was studied by Moroccan sociologist Paul Pascon. Starting with the 1999 film The Mummy, it has also been used as a filming location, and has become a tourist attraction especially for off-roaders.

== Description and location ==
Gara Medouar is located 12 km (7.5 mi) to the west of the principal tell of Sijilmasa, in the Tafilalt region. It is a limestone massif that rises 50 m (160 ft) above the desert and consists of fossiliferous beds from the Pragian to Frasnian. The entire area measures about 50 hectares. Most of the perimeter consists of vertical rocks with scree at the bottom. In the south/southwest, the circular formation is broken by a ravine, which continues into the formation as a wadi, providing entrance into the heart of the massif. The wadi starts after the confluence of four ravines, which divide the higher ground into five plateaus; At this confluence is a great circle of rock, surrounded by the overhanging plateaus. There is no source of water. Erosion has washed away all loose material, leaving only spurs, and the gara presents itself as essentially a funnel with the constituent canyons leading toward a single exit.

=== Structures: walls and dams ===
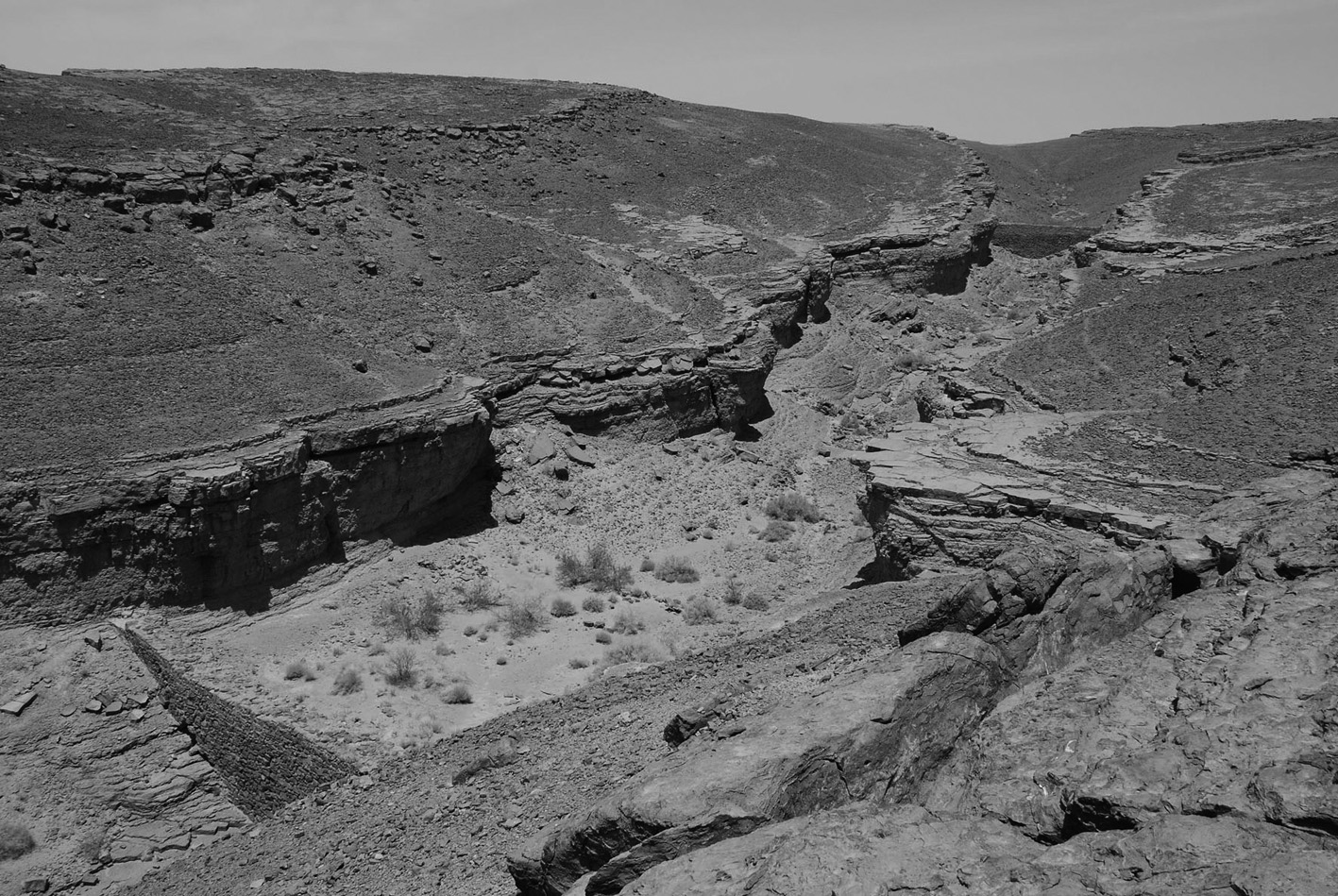
Two dams in one of the ravines

The formation, like the fortress of Tasghîmût near Marrakesh, is strategically located and naturally forms an almost complete fortress. Gara Medouar has only one large opening, a ravine in the south; about one third of the mountain's perimeter has been fortified by walls, the most important of which is the wall going straight across the ravine in the south. This well-preserved wall (the "low wall") is 8 m (26 ft) high where it abuts the rocks, and in places rises to 12 m (39 ft); it is 80 m (260 ft) long and about 4 m (13 ft) thick, and consists of limestone blocks held together with lime mortar.

Two "higher" walls are on the slopes. The shortest of the two is in the south and joins the low wall on its eastern end, where a gate was; the longest higher wall runs from the western end (at a bastion) almost to the northern tip of the massif. There may have been a postern, in about the middle of the western wall. The higher walls are up to 1.5 m (4 ft 11 in) thick, and between 1.5–2 m (4 ft 11 in – 6 ft 7 in) high. This higher wall allows for surveillance of the entire area south of the massif, and gaps between the rocks are filled in with masonry. It is here that Paul Pascon thought he recognized four towers—there is, in reality, only one construction that can be called a tower, the bastion at the northern end of the low wall. A separate wall surrounds the area in front of the low wall, at a distance of about 100 m (330 ft); most of the foundations of this wall have disappeared. It had a V-shape, with a dike and a ditch. In all, the defensive works evidence careful planning, architectural mastery, and a good sense of how best to exploit natural features. In addition to being a well-protected fort, its high ground also offers far-reaching control over the surrounding area—from the heights of Mudawwar, one can survey an area with a radius of about 50 km (31 mi).

The defensive structures also include four excellently-preserved dams in the largest ravines. The dams are between 1.5–2.3 m (4 ft 11 in – 7 ft 7 in) thick, and up to 5 m (16 ft) high. That they are dams and not walls is proven by their position, as well as their construction: on the uphill side, they are covered by a layer of mortar whose density indicates it was a water barrier. The reservoirs that would have been filled up during the rains do not appear to have supported agriculture: there are no irrigation channels. Still, some hydrological works may have existed, evidenced by shards possibly from the buckets of a noria. The combined evidence of walls and dams and possibly associated constructions indicate the massif became a fortress that could have withstood a siege lasting a few months, depending on the season.

=== Other structures ===
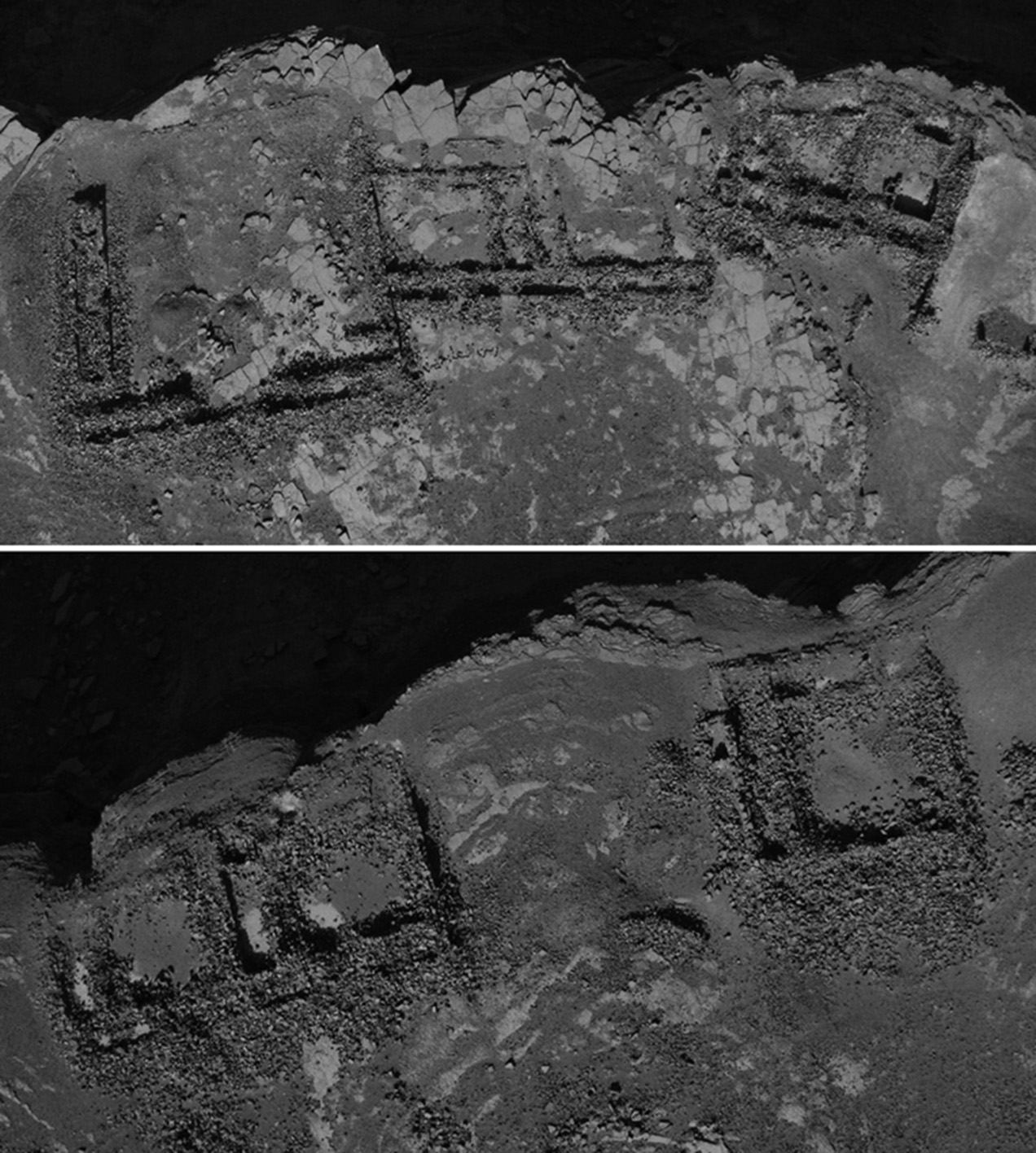
Aerial view of houses on the heights of Gara Medouar

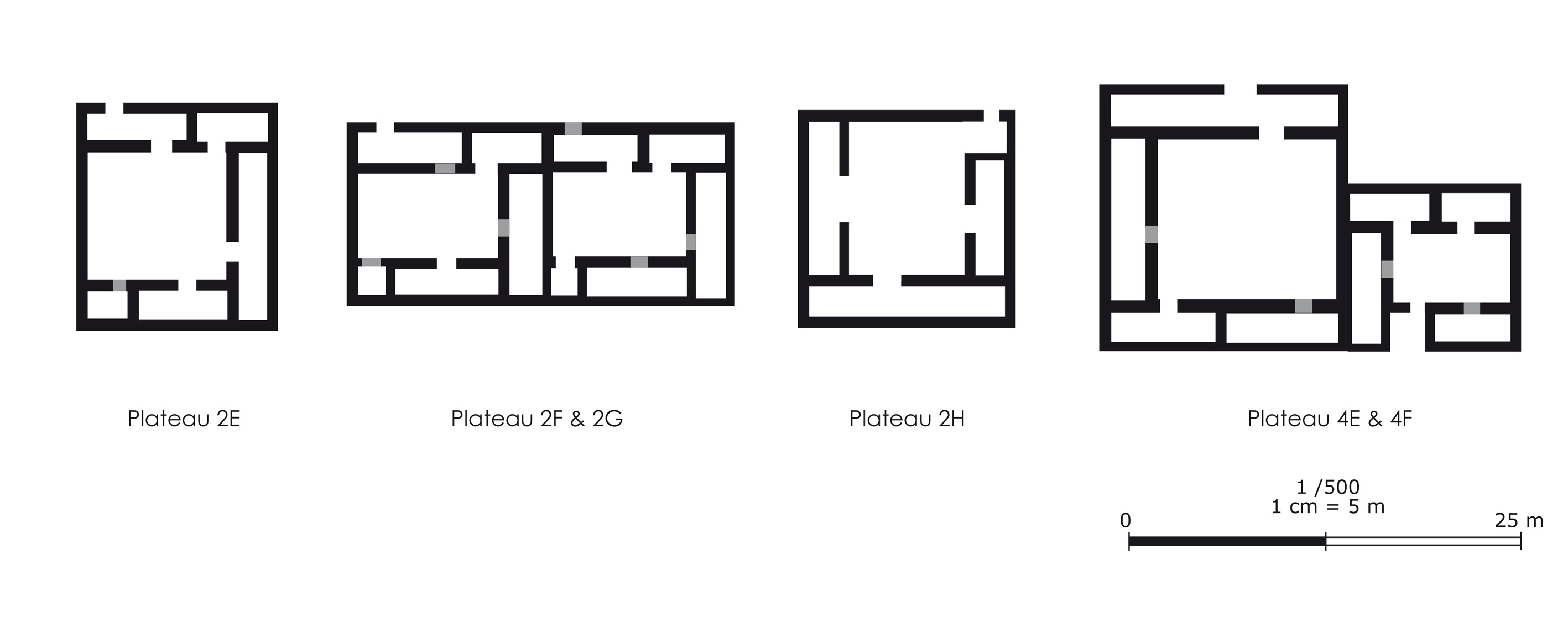
Sketches of some of the houses

Besides the walls and dams there are a number of other man-made structures, most of them on the plateaus and on the north or west side of steep peaks. Most of the 27 structures are spaced out from each other. Six of them are so ruined that their purpose cannot be established, though it is possible one of them was a musalla. Fifteen of the remaining buildings are quite similar (a uniformity or standardization that also signals a hierarchy and organization of spaces), and consist of a central, open space surrounded by separate rooms that open to the central space but not each other. Without archaeological digs, the purpose of these buildings cannot be established. Their organization, with a central space that dominates the other, surrounding rooms and is the only space in the structure that opens to the outside, resembles medieval Islamic architecture of both rural and urban areas. A tentative assessment is that most of the buildings on the plateaus were houses, built during a short space of time, possibly a large governmental campaign.

Six of the buildings are different. One of the two on the southernmost plateau consists of two adjoining structures as well as a space for animals, and had a latrine (made possible by its placement on the edge of the plateau). The only other building on the plateau was made of crude bricks (as opposed to rubble from limestone); it may have served as the dwelling for higher-ranked people. Its layout was quite different from all the other buildings, having a series of three rooms that were accessible from each other, rather than from the central space, in a style of architecture rarely found in the east but often in the west, particularly in the Iraq of the Abbasid Caliphate. The buildings, in their layout, construction, and spacing, suggest an elite occupied that part of the massif; the plateau itself already has characteristics that set it apart from the others: higher than the others, it offers a view of the defensive works (the low wall), the other structures in the area, the oasis of Tafilalt, and the peak of the Tizi/Mkhazni. Also indicative of a special status are the remains of access routes, including steps in steep rock, that provide direct access to the plateau from the lower area, and to another plateau. The combination of a set of dwellings whose variety indicates social hierarchy suggests Gara Medouar was not just a defensive works, but also an important habitation.

=== Date of occupation ===
Archeologist Chloé Capel argues that the site should be dated to the early medieval time of the caravan routes, 11th–12th century. Its defensive structures and buildings date from the time when Sijilmasa and its surrounding area were incorporated into the Almoravid dynasty, whose representatives likely ordered the construction, as evidenced by the standardized floor plans. The remains of pottery found at Gara Medouar also compare to contemporary pottery found at Sijilmasa. A garrison would have been installed in the massif; for a while, Sijilmasa was the only place where the empire's gold coins were minted. The fortress also protected the trade route coming in from the south.

== History ==
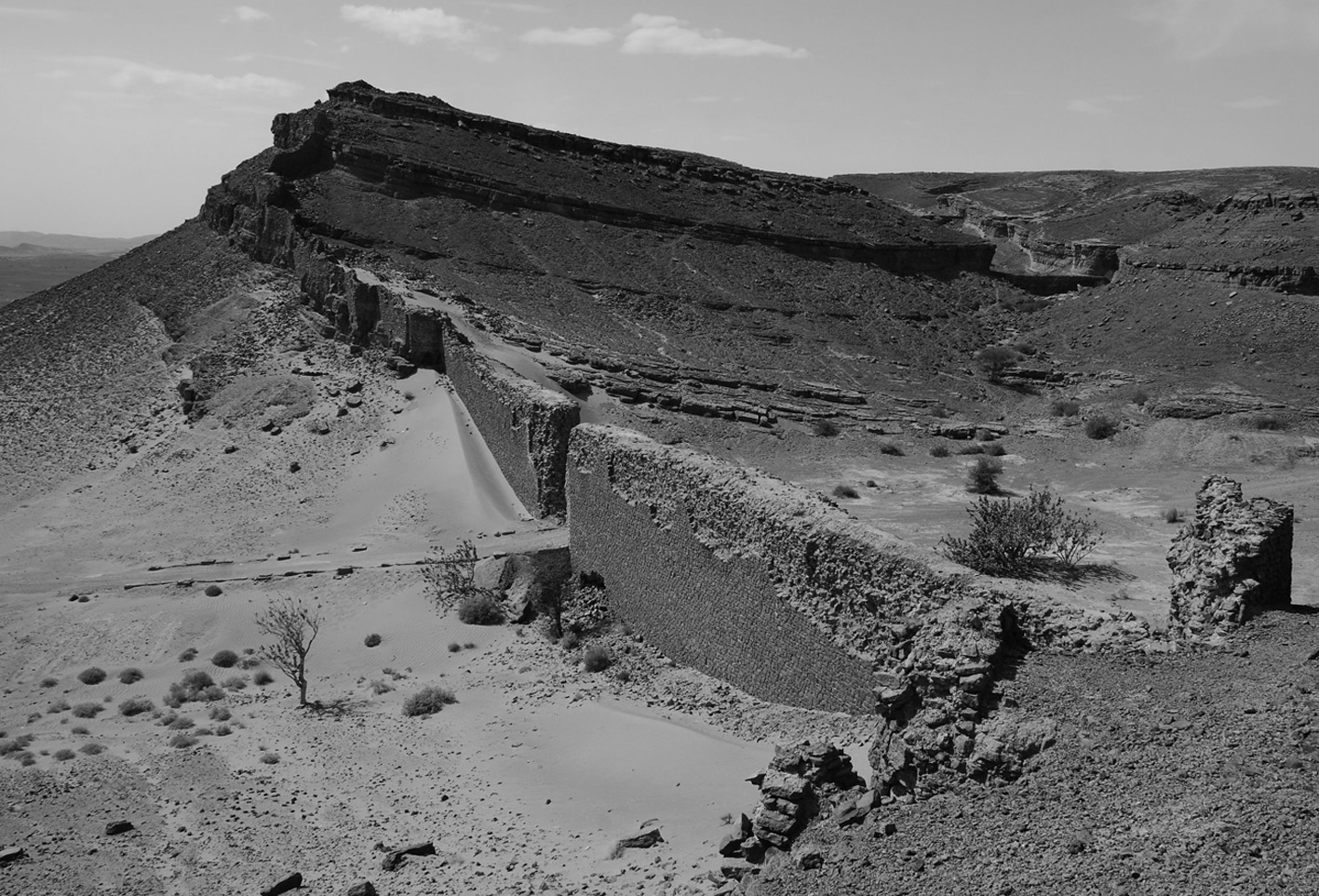
The lower wall, with ramp built for the set of The Mummy

Gara Medouar may have been the Tasagdalt mentioned by one of the amirs of the Banu Midrar dynasty, Muhammed Ibn al-Fath, who fled from Sijilmasa to "Tasagdalt, a stone fortress some twelve miles from Sijilmasa".

It was studied by Moroccan sociologist Paul Pascon, who wrote a brief note on it in the Moroccan journal Hespéris in 1956, and published a monograph, La Gara Medouar, that same year. Pascon first visited the site in 1952 when he spent a few hours at the location, long enough to allow him to write up a description in which he listed a defensive wall, four towers, four dams, and various other constructions; he considered the place a stronghold. Local oral tradition held that the place had been used centuries ago by Portuguese slavers, who had used the place as a warehouse. In 2011, an extensive study was done by MAPS (Moroccan–American Project at Sijilmasa) member Chloé Capel.

Its contemporary role as a tourist destination began with a film: the location was opened up for cinema, off-roading, and tourism because of the 1999 film The Mummy. The site itself was opened up because the crew built a concrete ramp through a breach in the low wall, in the southwest opening of the formation, and one of the film's central locations was built inside. In 1999, remains of plaster indicated where film sets had been constructed, and the area was littered with plastic bottles.

It has featured in many other films as well as TV mini series and product promotional videos, most famously as the setting for the secret headquarters of SPECTRE in the James Bond film Spectre (2015) and is now a well established tourist site. These activities have hampered recent archeological investigations: inside the wall the construction and then removal of the Mummy film set disrupted the area; outside the wall no excavations were done because of extensive disruption by the military, the film industry, and visiting tourists. Among the films and series are The Secret of the Sahara (1988), Prince of Persia: The Sands of Time (2010), Spectre, ZeroZeroZero (2019), Miss Fisher and the Crypt of Tears (2020), The Forgiven (2021), SAS: Rogue Heroes (2022), Sirāt (2025).

== See also ==
- Tasghîmût, another mountain fortress, near Marrakesh
