= Isa ibn Mazyad al-Aswad =

Historical Moroccan figure

Isa ibn Mazyad al-Aswad (died 772) was the first ruler of the oasis town of Sijilmasa, in what is now southeastern Morocco.

According to the traditional account, as narrated by the medieval sources (chiefly the 11th-century geographer al-Bakri), Sijilmasa was founded in 757/58 by a community of 40 Sufri Kharijites, led by the Berber Samgu ibn Wasul al-Miknasi. The establishment of the town was part of a larger westward movement of Sufri Kharijites in the Maghreb, fleeing the westward expansion of Abbasid power in Ifriqiya, and the establishment of the rival Ibadi Kharijite Rustamid emirate of Tahert.

Somewhat surprisingly, as Charles Pellat comments, the community chose Isa, who was reportedly the son of a black African convert to Islam, as their leader. Due to unspecified offensive actions, he was deposed by his subjects in 772, who left him to die, tied to a tree and exposed to the mosquitoes. He was succeeded by Samgu. Modern historians have suggested this episode as the result of ethnic or tribal rivalries, namely, that the election of Isa was due to an initial predominance of black Africans in the region, and his deposition and replacement as the result of the growth of the Kharijite Berber population over time.

== Sources ==
- Love, Paul M. Jr. (2010). "The Sufris of Sijilmasa: Toward a history of the Midrarids". The Journal of North African Studies. 15 (2): 173–188. doi:10.1080/13629380902734136. S2CID 145419823.
- Pellat, Ch. (1991). "Midrār". In Bosworth, C. E.; van Donzel, E. & Pellat, Ch. (eds.). The Encyclopaedia of Islam, Second Edition. Volume VI: Mahk–Mid. Leiden: E. J. Brill. pp. 1038–1042. ISBN 978-90-04-08112-3.

New title	Emir of Sijilmasa; 757/8 – 772	Succeeded by Samgu ibn Wasul al-Miknasi
