= Lisan al-Gharbi =

Extinct Berber dialect of Morocco

- Native to: Formerly, Morocco
- Region: Atlantic plains
- Extinct: 14th–16th century
- Language family: Afro-Asiatic: Berber; Northern; Atlas; Lisan al-Gharbi
- Writing system: Arabic

Official status
- Official language in: Formerly, Tamesna

Language codes
- ISO 639-3: None (mis)
- Glottolog: None

Lisan al-Gharbi (Arabic: لسان الغربي, "Western dialect") is the name given to an extinct dialect of Berber that was spoken over much of the Atlantic plains of Morocco. It was closely related to Tashelhit. The Lisan al-Gharbi was the official language of the Barghawata Confederacy, and the idiom used in Salih ibn Tarif's "indigenous Qur'an".

The Atlantic plains were historically inhabited Barghawata tribal group, however this area was largely destroyed and depopulated by the Almoravids in their war against the heretic Barghawata, and it was depopulated again by an Almohad expedition in 1149–1150 and again in 1197–1198 to suppress revolts against them in the region.

In the 12th century, the Almohad ruler Abd al-Mu'min resettled the depopulated area with recent Bedouin Arab immigrants such as Banu Hilal and Banu Sulaym as part of the Arab migrations to the Maghreb. The Almohads helped the Arab tribes to pass the barriers of Atlas mountains, and accelerated their expansion to Morocco to complete the nomadic Bedouin predominance over the lowlands of the Maghreb as far as the Atlantic coastal plains, introducing a significant Arab element to the ethnic population of Morocco. With the decline of the Almohad army, the Arabs became the most powerful force in the Moroccan plains, and no ruler could have held authority there without their support. This led to Arabic becoming the dominant language and the extinction of the Lisan al-Gharbi and its former inhabitants by the 14th century.

== Works ==
A letter, Rissalat al-fusul, written in Béjaia on the orders of 'Abd al-Mu'min in Rabī' I 556 (January 1161) recalls the foundations of the Almohad doctrine and the fact that al-lisān al-ġarbī is the official name of this language and its sacred character.

The work Kitāb al-ansāb fī maʿrifat al-aṣḥāb, which contains a sentence pronounced by Ibn Tumart when he was in a cave in Igiliz, makes it possible to make the link between the Arabic phrase and the Berber noun group (bi-l-lisān al-ġarbī or "in the Western language"), which in this context corresponds to the expression "in the Berber language".
