= Ryuk =

Ryuk may refer to:

- Ryuk (Death Note), a character in the Death Note media franchise
- Ryuk (ransomware)
- Ryuk (village) or Rük, a village in the Quba Rayon of Azerbaijan
- Ryuk, a romanization for 6 in Korean numerals
- Ryuk, a North Korean romanization for the Yook surname
