= Paul Pascon =

Moroccan sociologist (1932–1985)

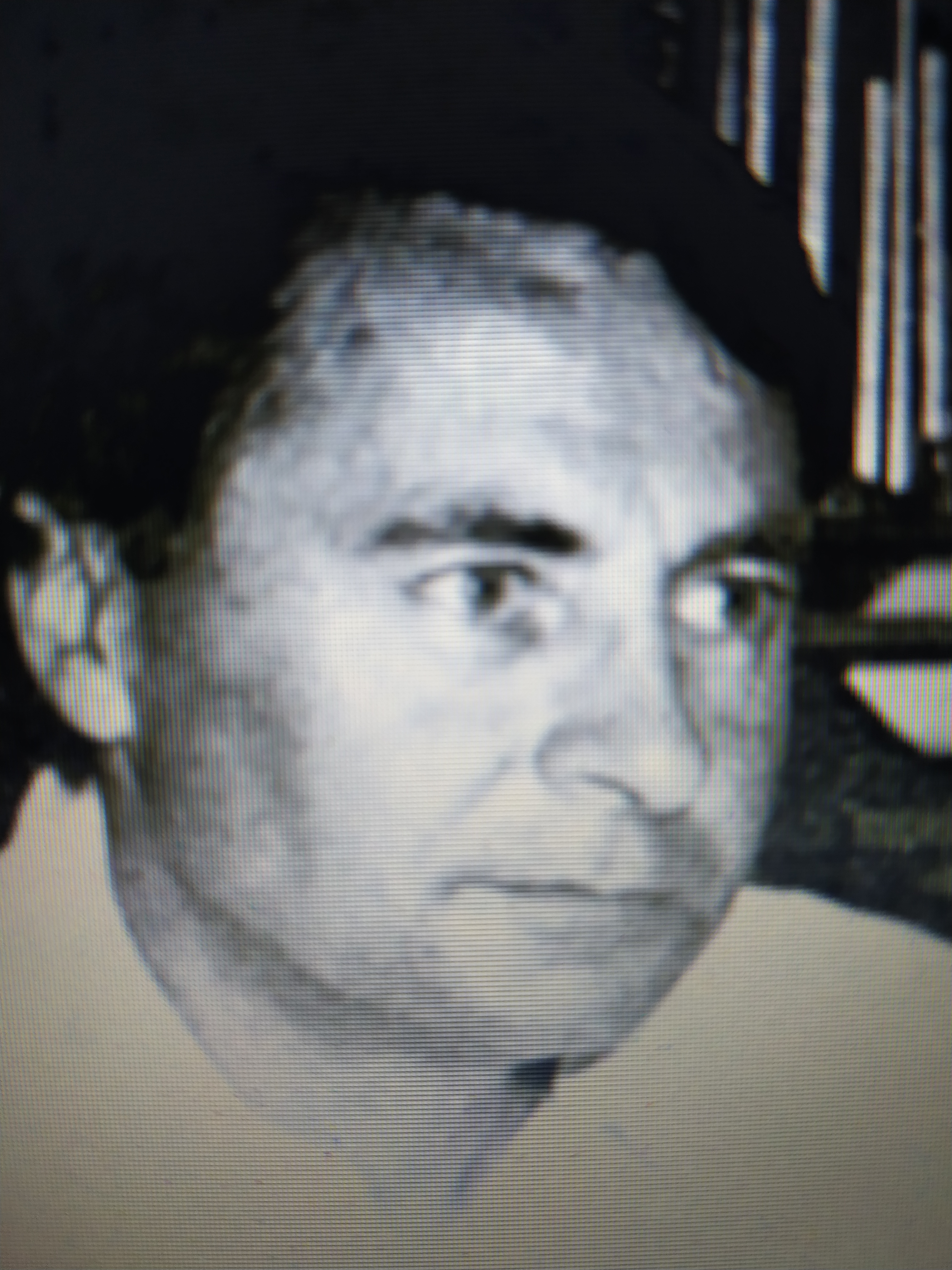
Imagen-Paul-Pascon

Paul Pascon (13 April 1932 – 21 April 1985) was a Moroccan sociologist whose multidisciplinary work aimed to elucidate French colonialism in Morocco and the capitalism that accompanied it, and the development of Morocco after its independence from France. He was perhaps the first modern scholar to study Gara Medouar, and he was one of the foremost experts on the Moroccan economy and agriculture and its transformation under colonialism and after independence.

== Early life ==
Pascon was a Pied-Noir, "of soldier and settler stock". He was born in Fez, French Morocco, the son of an engineer of public works, from whom he inherited a love of the outdoors. Later in life he told his friend Ernest Gellner of his family history: his grandfather, he said, had been a Pied-Noir who had acquired land in Morocco after World War I but never became a successful farmer. One of his ancestors had been involved in the Rif War, and the French-Moroccan conflict of the 1950s also provoked tension. As a result of these involvements he developed "a lifelong devotion to the understanding and advancement of the Moroccan peasant"; later (in 1964) he acquired Moroccan citizenship. He became a scout when he was seven. In 1942 his father was imprisoned in Boudenib and his mother placed in Midelt for opposing the Vichy regime; Paul was placed in a boarding school until the Americans arrived in North Africa.

== Career ==
A materialist who emphasized the crucial importance of ideas, a sociologist who emphasized the importance of geography, technology, and above all history, Pascon saw in the Haouz both a terrain for investigation and also a subject from which Moroccans (and others) could learn how change took place and how change could be generated.

At age 17, Pascon won a prize for a report on the Ziz and Rhéris rivers, and in 1951 he received his baccalauréat in experimental sciences from the Lycée Gouraud in Rabat. He chose natural science and received his Certificat d'études supérieures préparatoires in 1952. In that year he also visited Gara Medouar; he wrote about his visit in a 1956 article in the journal Hespéris, and it became the subject of a 1956 monograph.

In 1956, Pascon was licensed in natural sciences, and sociology in 1958. After a number of administrative jobs he was hired by Institut agronomique et vétérinaire Hassan-II in 1970, where he worked until his death in a variety of functions, founding and leading units including the Department for Rural Development. His 1975 thesis was an interdisciplinary study (involving history, sociology, and geography, coupled with his own research, including archives from local families and potentates) of the Haouz province of Marrakesh; it was published in 1977, and one critic called it "a major step forward in North African studies. It exemplifies the depth of analysis possible when interdisciplinary techniques, indigenous sources, and a creative mind are brought to bear on a single region". A former communist and Marxist, he let go of those ideologies later in life.

Pascon was also a research associate at Centre national de la recherche scientifique, France, and associate professor at Université catholique de Louvain in Belgium.

== Personal life ==
Paul Pascon was an atheist. Pascon's two children died during the Western Sahara War.

Pascon died on 21 April 1985 in Mauritania after a car accident; he was survived by his widow. In an obituary, his friend Ernest Gellner wrote: "He died at the height of his powers, at a time when he was being quite exceptionally productive. His death is a human tragedy, but it is also an immeasurable loss to scholarship. He was unquestionably one of the most thorough, profound, best informed and penetrating of the students of Moroccan and North African society".

== Publications ==
- Le Haouz de Marrakech (Rabat: Editions Marocaines et Internationales, 1977). Pascon's doctoral thesis, in two volumes; an interdisciplinary study. One critic reviewed it as if it were a drama with four main characters: the tribes, which make up the basic human component but in a great variety; the Zawaya, a religious group which also exercised considerable political power; the qaids, local chieftains whose power was structured in a kind of feudalism Pascon called caïdalism; and the city of Marrakesh.
- La Maison d'lligh et l'histoire sociale du Tazerwalt (Rabat: Societé Marocaine des Editeurs Reunis (SMER), 1984). A history of the House of Illigh, the family that controlled the area of Tazerwalt from the 17th century on. Pascon was still working on this when he died; it had taken him seventeen years to gain the confidence of the family's patriarch and be allowed access to the family archives. The posthumously published book contains five separate studies on various aspects of the family—from their acquisition of land and the execution of hydrological works in 1640 to 19th-century trade documentation, and an 1825 murder.
- Capitalism and Agriculture in the Haouz of Marrakesh (London: Routledge and Kegan Paul, 1986). A translation of the second part of his doctoral thesis, edited by John R. Hall. It studies the history of the Haouz region before, during, and after colonialism, relying on dependency theory rather than Marxism. Land usage is the tool with which to measure how far capitalism penetrated into an agricultural, peripheral society.
