= Ubayd Allah ibn al-Habhab =

Egyptian Umayyad official

Ubayd Allah ibn al-Habhab al-Saluli (Arabic: عبيد الله بن الحبحاب السلولي) was an important Umayyad official in Egypt from 724 to 734, and subsequently Umayyad governor of Kairouan, Ifriqiya from 734 to 741. It was under his rule that the Great Berber Revolt broke out in the Maghreb (North Africa) and al-Andalus (Iberian Peninsula).

== Background and character ==
Ubayd Allah ibn al-Habhab was an Arab official of the Banu Makhzum, a clan of the Quraysh. Although exceptionally educated and remarkably competent and well-respected, Ubayd Allah was the grandson of a manumitted slave. That humble origin may have embarrassed him and left him with a sense of personal insecurity among the high-bloods that packed the Umayyad circles. Throughout his career, Ubayd Allah seemed to have been overly obsequious, a little too eager to please the whims of the well-born lords of Damascus, while simultaneously exhibiting a harsh and almost vicious disdain of those below him, particularly non-Arabs. Both those character traits would have significant consequences.

== Official in Egypt ==
In 724, the Umayyad Caliph Hisham ibn Abd al-Malik appointed Ubayd Allah as sahib al-kharaj, or head of taxation in Egypt. As Egyptian governors proved ineffective, Ubayd Allah became Hisham's point man and effective ruler of Egypt. Ubayd Allah secured the dismissal of Egyptian governor al-Hurr ibn Yusuf in 727, and again his successor Hafs ibn al-Walid ibn Yusuf al-Hadrami, after they challenged his administrative powers.

To expand fiscal revenues, in 725, Ubayd Allah raised the kharaj by an eighth and appointed Arab officials (rather than local Egyptians) as tax-collectors. This provoked a revolt by Egyptian Copts in 725–26. Leaderless and disorganized, the Coptic revolt went nowhere and was quashed by the Arab authorities under the direction of Ubayd Allah, with quite some bloodshed.

It became evident that the Arabs needed to expand their presence in Egypt. At Ubayd Allah's suggestion, in 726, the Caliph Hisham began dispatching Arab regiments drawn from the Qaysid (or 'Nejdi') tribes of central Arabia, partly in order to get the more troublesome Qaysid regiments out of the vicinity of Damascus, partly to counterbalance the local Arab soldiers already in Fustat and Alexandria (drawn from Kalbid or 'Yemenite' stock of south Arabian tribes) lest they be used as a power base for ambitious local nobles against the central Umayyad government. To prevent quarrels, the Qaysid soldiers, some 5,000 who arrived during the time of Ubayd Allah, were settled in the eastern Hawf and forbidden from entering Fustat.

== Governor in Ifriqiya ==
In late 732, Ubayda ibn Abd al-Rahman al-Sulami, governor of Ifriqiya had been swiftly dismissed by Caliph Hisham following a personal quarrel. The Kairouan government was placed in the temporary hands of the lieutenant-governor Uqba ibn Qudama and the qadi Abd Allah ibn al-Mughira ibn Burda. In al-Andalus (Iberian Peninsula), Abd al-Malik ibn Katan al-Fihri of the illustrious Fihrid clan, was acclaimed by the Andalusian Arabs as ruler after the death of wali Abd al-Rahman ibn Abd Allah al-Ghafiqi at the Battle of Tours in October 732.

Seeking to restore order in the west, in April 734, the Umayyad Caliph Hisham appointed his old Egyptian hand Ubayd Allah ibn al-Habhab as governor of Kairouan, Ifriqiya, with supervisory authority over all the Maghreb (North Africa west of Egypt) and al-Andalus.

Ubayd Allah ibn al-Habhab found the westerly domains of the Caliphate in disorder and the treasury thin following the mismanagement and reverses of the preceding years. Over Andalusian opposition, Ubayd Allah dispatched Uqba ibn al-Hajjaj as his deputy in Córdoba (al-Andalus), replacing the popular governor Abd al-Malik ibn Qatan al-Fihri. Around this time, Ubayd Allah appointed Umar ibn Abd Allah al-Muradi as his deputy in Tangier (al-Udwa).

Ubayd Allah ibn al-Habhab immediately set about dynamizing his fiscal resources by ordering new raids. In 734, an expedition was set out against Byzantine-ruled Sicily (the seventh in as many years), but it proved to be a failure. In 735, Ubayd Allah dispatched an Ifriqiyan army under commander Habib ibn Abi Ubayda al-Fihri to conquer Sous and the southerly regions of Morocco, acquiring substantial booty to replenish the treasury and bringing the region within the Umayyad caliphate. In 735, an amphibian Arab expedition was launched upon Provence, capturing Arles and Avignon and the lower Rhone valley. But the expeditionary force was expelled from Provence in 737–38 in a joint operation by Charles Martel of the Franks and Liutprand of the Lombards.

In 740, Ubayd Allah dispatched Habib ibn Abi Ubayda al-Fihri at the head of an Arab expedition across the water to Sicily in what was possibly the first attempt at a full-scale invasion of the island (rather than a mere raid). Habib had a successful landing and laid a brief siege to Syracuse, securing its submission to tribute, before events in Africa forced them to break off the invasion.

== The Berber Revolt ==
In the late 730s, Ubayd Allah ibn al-Habhab had begun leaning more heavily on the Berbers under his jurisdiction to make up for the financial shortfalls. Contravening Islamic law and the 718 edicts of the Caliph Umar II, Ubayd Allah reinstated some of the extraordinary dhimmi taxation (the jizyah and kharaj) and slave-tributes on the Muslim Berber population, provoking immense opposition. Similar policies were implemented by his deputies Uqba ibn al-Hajjaj al-Saluli in al-Andalus and (with particular zeal) Umar ibn Abd Allah al-Muradi in Morocco.

Ubayd Allah expanded his activities to meet the demands of the elites of Damascus, Ubayd Allah sent his officials in the relentless pursuit of the highly prized wool of unborn Merino lambs, seizing (and destroying) entire flocks, which affected the livelihoods of many Berber communities—just to gather the handful he could dispatch back to Syria. Berber girls and women were also highly prized as concubines by Damascus lords. To meet this demand, Ubayd Allah ordered them seized and kidnapped in great numbers, including the wives and daughters of loyal Berber chieftains.

Berber patience finally broke in 740, in what became known as the Great Berber Revolt. It began with an uprising in Tangiers against Ubayd Allah's tax-collectors and raiders. Fired up by Sufrite (Kharijite) activists, the Berber tribes of western Morocco (the Ghomara, Miknasa and Berghwata) formed a coalition and acclaimed the Berber chieftain Maysara al-Matghari as 'caliph'. Tangiers fell into the hands of the Berber rebels hands, and soon enough the entire length of Morocco, from the Straits down to the Sous. Ubayd Allah's own son, Ismail, then a governor in the Sous, was killed by the rebels.

Ubayd Allah immediately dispatched orders to Habib ibn Abi Ubayda al-Fihri to break off the Sicilian invasion and return the Ifriqiyan army to Africa. In the meantime, he dispatched a vanguard cavalry force, composed of the aristocratic Arab elite of Kairouan under the command of Khalid ibn Abi Habib al-Fihri, to hold the line against the Berber rebels while awaiting the Sicilian expeditionary force.

After a few skirmishes with the Arab vanguard in the outskirts of Tangiers, the Berber rebels decided to depose Maysara and reorganize their forces under the Zenata chieftain Khalid ibn Hamid al-Zanati. Khalid ordered an immediate attack and destroyed the Ifriqiyan vanguard at the Battle of the Nobles in October 740, cutting down the cream of the Ifriqyan Arab nobility. The main Ifriqiyan force under Habib ibn Abi Ubayda arrived too late to prevent the massacre, and retreated to Tlemcen, which was already in open revolt following a massacre of Sufrites by Arabs.

Governor Ubayd Allah ibn al-Habhab forwarded the report of the battle to Damascus and requested reinforcements. Caliph Hisham, shocked at the news, dismissed Ubayd Allah in February, 741 and began preparations to dispatch a large eastern Arab army under a new governor, Kulthum ibn Iyad al-Qushayri to crush the Berber rebellion. The disgraced Ubayd Allah left Ifriqiya in April 741, and returned to the east.

== See also ==
- History of early Islamic Tunisia
- History of medieval Tunisia

Vacant Title last held by Ubayda ibn Abd al-Rahman es-Solemi	Governor of Ifriqiya; 734–741	Succeeded by Kulthum ibn Iyad al-Qasi
