= Samgu ibn Wasul al-Miknasi =

Abu'l-Qasim Samgu ibn Wasul al-Miknasi (died 784/5) was a Miknasa Berber leader who according to tradition founded the oasis town of Sijilmasa and became its second ruler.

According to the traditional account, as narrated by the medieval sources (chiefly the 11th-century geographer al-Bakri), Samgu (or Samgun) was a Miknasa Berber who adopted Sufri Kharijism, and was a student of the famous Berber Khariji missionary Ikrimah Mawla Ibn Abbas. He chose the site of Sijilmasa, which he used as pasture for his flocks, and with 40 followers established a town there in 757/8. The establishment of the town was part of a larger westward movement of Sufri Kharijites in the Maghreb, fleeing the westward expansion of Abbasid power in Ifriqiya, and the establishment of the rival Ibadi Kharijite Rustamid emirate of Tahert.

Somewhat surprisingly, as Charles Pellat comments, the community chose a black African, Isa ibn Mazyad al-Aswad as its leader, but he was deposed and left to die, tied to a tree, in 772, with Samgu succeeding him. Modern historians have suggested this episode as the result of ethnic or tribal rivalries, namely, that the election of Isa was due to an initial predominance of black Africans in the region, and his deposition and replacement as the result of the growth of the Kharijite Berber population over time.

According to the medieval sources, Samgu reigned for 13 years and died in 784/5. He was succeeded by his son, Abu'l-Wazir al-Yas, who was deposed in 790/1 by his brother Abu'l-Muntasir al-Yasa.

== Sources ==
- Love, Paul M. Jr. (2010). "The Sufris of Sijilmasa: Toward a history of the Midrarids". The Journal of North African Studies. 15 (2): 173–188. doi:10.1080/13629380902734136. S2CID 145419823.
- Pellat, Ch. (1991). "Midrār". In Bosworth, C. E.; van Donzel, E. & Pellat, Ch. (eds.). The Encyclopaedia of Islam, Second Edition. Volume VI: Mahk–Mid. Leiden: E. J. Brill. pp. 1038–1042. ISBN 978-90-04-08112-3.

Preceded by Isa ibn Mazyad al-Aswad	Emir of Sijilmasa; 772–784/5	Succeeded by Abu'l-Wazir al-Yas ibn Abi'l-Qasim
