= Steephead valley =

Landform

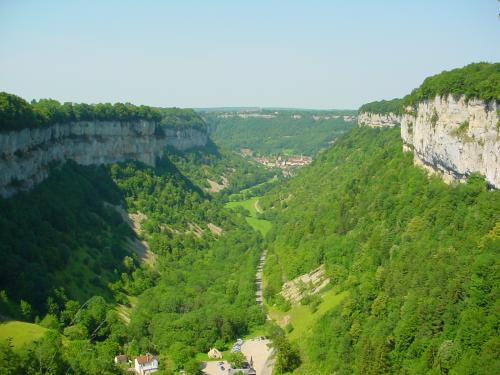
The Reculée de Baume

A steephead valley, steephead or blind valley is a deep, narrow, flat bottomed valley with an abrupt ending. Such closed valleys may arise in limestone or karst landscapes, where a layer of permeable rock lies above an impermeable substrate such as marl. Water flowing through a steephead valley leaves via one or more ponors or sinkholes.

Blind valleys are typically dry at their lower ends. If the ponor cannot contain the high runoff during a flood event an intermittent flow may continue through the valley beyond the sink. Such a landform is called a semi-blind or half-blind valley.

== Development ==
They are created by a stream flowing within the permeable rock and eroding it from within, until the rock above collapses opening up a steep narrow valley which is then further eroded by the stream running across the impermeable valley floor. At the head of the valley the stream emerges from the rock as a spring. Notable examples can be found in the Jura region of France, for example the Reculée de Baume at Baume-les-Messieurs and the Reculée d'Arbois with its head at Les Planches-près-Arbois and its exit at Arbois.

In North America, blind valleys (the preferred American term) are found in the Driftless Area and other karst regions.

== Examples ==
- Tasghîmût
- Gara Medouar

== See also ==
- Box canyon
