= Söhüb =

- Municipality
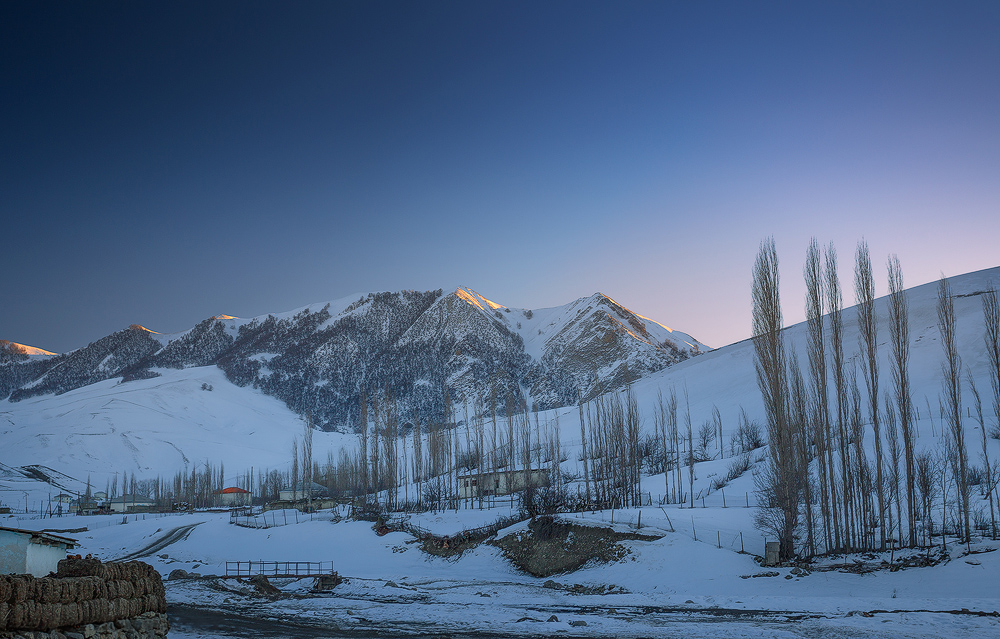

- Location within Azerbaijan
- Coordinates: 41°09′11″N 48°24′03″E
- Country: Azerbaijan
- Rayon: Quba

Population
  - Total: 993
- Time zone: UTC+4 (AZT)
  - Summer (DST): UTC+5 (AZT)

Söhüb (also, Sukhyub, Syugyub, and Syukhyub) is a village and municipality in the Quba Rayon of Azerbaijan. It has a population of 993. The municipality consists of the villages of Söhüb and Rük.
