= 739 =

Calendar year

739 in various calendars
Gregorian calendar	739; DCCXXXIX
Ab urbe condita	1492
Armenian calendar	188; ԹՎ ՃՁԸ
Assyrian calendar	5489
Balinese saka calendar	660–661
Bengali calendar	145–146
Berber calendar	1689
Buddhist calendar	1283
Burmese calendar	101
Byzantine calendar	6247–6248
Chinese calendar	戊寅年 (Earth Tiger); 3436 or 3229 — to — 己卯年 (Earth Rabbit); 3437 or 3230
Coptic calendar	455–456
Discordian calendar	1905
Ethiopian calendar	731–732
Hebrew calendar	4499–4500
- Hindu calendars
Vikram Samvat	795–796
Shaka Samvat	660–661
Kali Yuga	3839–3840
Holocene calendar	10739
Iranian calendar	117–118
Islamic calendar	121–122
Japanese calendar	Tenpyō 11 (天平１１年)
Javanese calendar	632–633
Julian calendar	739; DCCXXXIX
Korean calendar	3072
Minguo calendar	1173 before ROC 民前1173年
Nanakshahi calendar	−729
Seleucid era	1050/1051 AG
Thai solar calendar	1281–1282
Tibetan calendar	ས་ཕོ་སྟག་ལོ་ (male Earth-Tiger); 865 or 484 or −288 — to — ས་མོ་ཡོས་ལོ་ (female Earth-Hare); 866 or 485 or −287

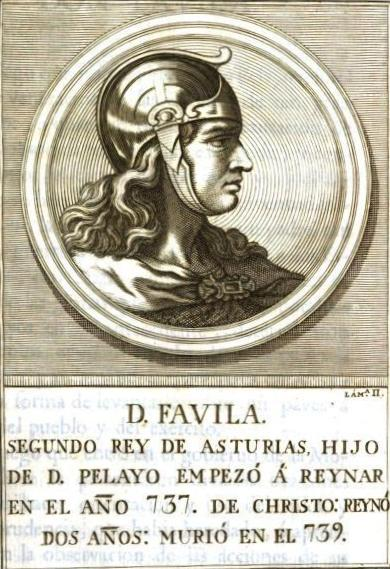
King Favila of Asturias (Spain)

Year 739 (DCCXXXIX) was a common year starting on Thursday of the Julian calendar. The denomination 739 for this year has been used since the early medieval period, when the Anno Domini calendar era became the prevalent method in Europe for naming years.

== Events ==
=== By place ===
==== Europe ====
- The Lombards under King Liutprand sack the Exarchate of Ravenna, and threaten Rome. Pope Gregory III asks Charles Martel, Merovingian mayor of the palace, to help fight the Lombards (he also requests assistance in fighting the Byzantines and the Arabs). Liutprand signs a peace accord, and pulls back his forces to Pavia. After the pope's appeal to the Franks, a relationship begins that will continue as the Frankish Kingdom gains power.
- Umayyad conquest of Gaul: Charles Martel attacks Duke Maurontus of Provence and his Muslim allies. His brother Childebrand captures Marseille, one of the largest cities still in Umayyad hands. Maurontus is forced to go into hiding in the Alps.
- King Favila of Asturias dies after a 2-year reign (probably killed by a bear). He is succeeded by his brother-in-law Alfonso I, husband of his sister Ermesinda.
- Duke Pemmo of Friuli is deposed by Liutprand, and succeeded by his son Ratchis. He flees with his followers, but Ratchis secures his father's pardon.
- Theodatus Ursus is appointed hypatos (Byzantine consul) and magister militum of Venice.

==== Africa ====
- The Great Berber Revolt: The Berbers break out in revolt against the Umayyad rulers at Maghreb, in response to the oppressive, (and, by Islamic law, illegal) tax-collection and slave-tribute. The rebellion is led by the chieftain (alleged water-carrier) Maysara al-Matghari. He successfully seizes Tangier, and rapidly captures much of western Morocco. The Berber rebellion which erupts not only undermines caliphal rule and fragments the wilayat or province of Ifriqiya (North Africa), but paves the way for the emergence of autonomous local Arab dynasties.

=== By topic ===
==== Religion ====
- Boniface, Anglo-Saxon missionary who has been Christianizing Bavaria, founds the bishoprics of Salzburg, Regensburg, Freising, and Passau.
- Willibrord, the first bishop of Utrecht in the Netherlands, and Northumbrian missionary, dies at Echternach (modern Luxembourg).

== Births ==
- Lu Mai, chancellor of the Tang Dynasty (d. 798)
- Yuan Zi, chancellor of the Tang Dynasty (d. 818)

== Deaths ==
- Aldwulf, Anglo-Saxon bishop
- Engelmund, Anglo-Saxon missionary
- Favila, king of Asturias (Spain)
- Nothhelm, Anglo-Saxon bishop
- Pemmo, duke of Friuli (Italy)
- Willibrord, Anglo-Saxon bishop
