= Tasghîmût =

Medieval fortress in Marrakesh, Morocco

Tasghîmût (also Tashgimut, Tashgimout) is a medieval fortress near Marrakesh, Morocco, built on a rocky plateau (an "erosion cirque") and fortified by the Almoravids under Ali ibn Yusuf in the 12th century to protect the nearby capital of Aghmat when the Almohads were making inroads in the western Maghreb. The fortress was conquered by the Almohads in 1132. Some archaeological excavations were carried out in the 20th century, but many of the remains of the fortifications have been used for local building projects.

== Location and history ==
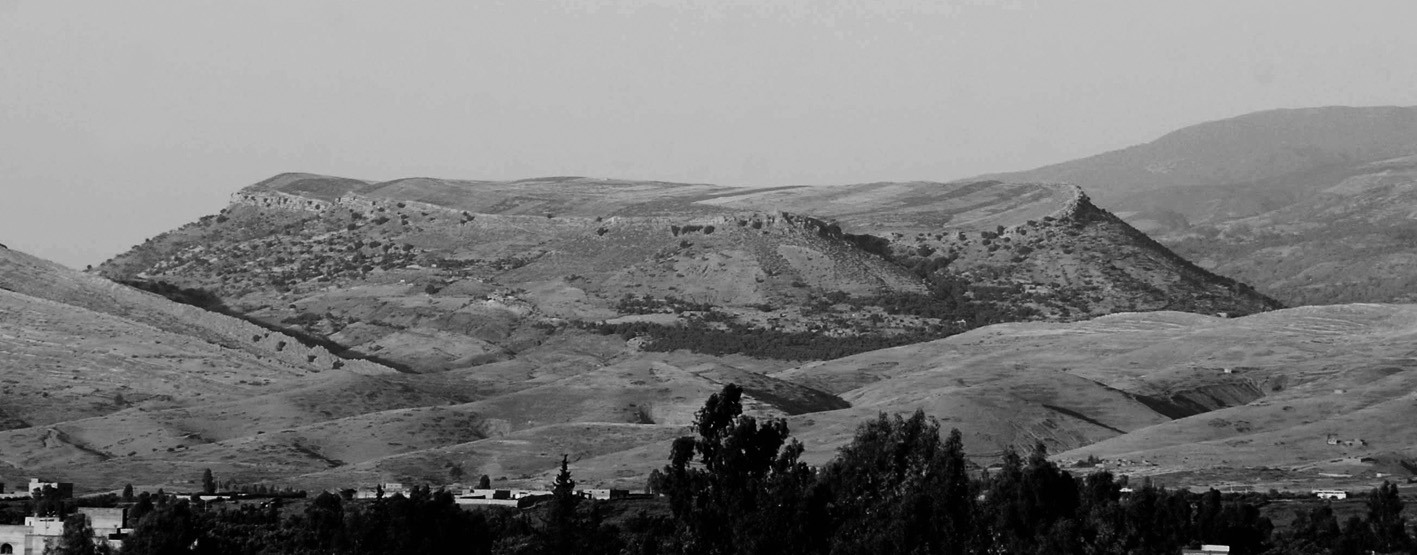
View from the north-west of Tasghîmût; photo by Chloé Capel, 2013.

Tasghîmût is about 40 km (25 mi) south-east of Marrakesh. At one time it dominated the ancient capital of Aghmat. The site, which also has evidence of Neolithic occupation, resembles Jebel Mudawwar, as an oval, rocky plateau cut through by ravines, overlooking a surrounding plain. Like Jebel Mudawwar it has defensive lines that follow the topography, as well as dams, and one of its inhabited areas is singled out for a privileged occupant.

The fortifications were built on order of Ali ibn Yusuf, and were made of rammed earth, not masonry, indicating that they were constructed with expedience at a time when the Almoravid dynasty was threatened by the Almohad Caliphate. It was conquered by the Almohads in 1132, and Almohad caliph Abd al-Mu'min had the wooden gates removed, to be installed at Tinmel.

The fortress was built on a plateau with an altitude of 1,240 m (4,070 ft), some sixty years after the construction of a fortress in Marrakesh, whose remains are on the perimeter of the first Koutoubia Mosque; their discovery in 1948 led Charles Allain and Jacques Meunié to study Tasghîmût. A defensive wall 3.5 km (2.2 mi) long was completed by 1125. Most defensive buildings are oriented toward the west, the most vulnerable side. These include a large bastion named Bab Ghâdir, whose remains are still there, and a tower on the southernmost side. The wall was around 2 m (6 ft 7 in) thick, and featured a total of 15 rectangular bastions, overhanging the wall. The complex was accessed through a gate in the north-west called the Bab el Mohaddin ("Gate of the Almohads"); nearby was a kasbah which had living quarters, storage rooms, an arsenal, and the living quarters for the garrison's chief.

== Recent history, archeology ==
Archeological investigations of the site were published in 1927, 1951, and 1999. The first one, by Henri Basset and Henri Terrasse, was started in 1923 and the results were published in 1927 (no excavations were carried out). Since no masonry was used and the buildings were all executed in a simple and unadorned manner, they concluded that the fortress was quickly constructed, though the surface area indicated that a large garrison must have been stationed here. After the discovery of the fort at Koutoubia, a second study at Tasghîmût was begun in 1949, led by Charles Allain and Jacques Meunié. First they studied the terrain, and 1951 they began excavating the most important buildings: the gates, the western bastion, and parts of the kasbah. Their study was published in 1951. They remarked that the plateau must have seen a lot of traffic already before the Almohads: flint tools and a polished axe from the Neolithic were found close to a now-dry spring. Since their investigation, much of the stone material has been hauled off to serve local building needs.
