= Al-Ruk al-Nasiri =

Al-Ruk al-Nasiri (Egyptian Arabic: الروك الناصري) refers to the process of land surveying that took place during the reign of the Sultan Al-Nasir Mahammad bin Qalawun. Al-Qalqashandi mentioned that the Al-Ruk al-Nasiri began in the year 716 AH/1316 AD, but Al-Maqrizi mentioned that it began in the year 715 AH/1315 AD. Al-Ruk al-Nasiri helped in the equitable distribution of lands and control over the feudal lords.

== Time of Al-Ruk al-Nasiri ==
In the introduction to his book “التحفة السنية بأسماء البلاد المصرية ,” Ibn al-Jia’an attributed the creation of this ruk to the time of the Sultan Al-Ashraf Sha'ban. However, the German orientalist Bernhard Mortiz mentioned in his introduction in French to the book “التحفة السنية بأسماء البلاد المصرية ,” and Prince Omar Toussoun in his book “مالية مصر منذ عهد الفراعنة إلى الآن", they both have proven the opposite, and Prince Omar Toussoun says:

“This space is sometimes called Ibn al-Ji’an ruk, in reference to the name of this author, and sometimes by the name al-Ashraf Sha’ban ruk, in reference to this sultan who was ruler of Egypt in the year 777 AH (1375 AD), which is the year that Ibn al-Ji’an mentioned, when he said that his book describes the situation. On which the provinces were in the aforementioned year, this area was in fact nothing but the ruk of Sultan Al-Nasir Mahammad, and this ruk is the one about which Al-Maqrizi said that it was the work of this sultan in the year 715 AH (1315 AD) and that it remained in use until the year 784 AH (1382 AD). Accordingly, it will be integrated within the period of the rule of Al-Ashraf Sha'ban.”

== Reasons of the Al-Ruk al-Nasiri ==
Al-Maqrizi mentioned the justifications for Sultan Al-Nasir Mahammad bin Qalawun creating a new ruk, despite the fact that not much time had passed since the establishment of the Al-Ruk al-Hossami ruk, which was created in the year 697 AH/1298 AD, and he said:

“When the days of Al-Nasir came, Al-Nasir Mahammad applied ruk to the country, the compiler of the Al-Nasiriyah biography said: In the year 715 AH (1315 AD), Sultan Al-Malik Al-Nasir Mahammad ibn Qalawun chose to ruk the Egyptian lands, to abolish many taxes from them, and to prefer to the people of his kingdom a large part of the lands of Egypt, and the reason for that was he considered a lot of the Al-Akhbaz (Mamluk term for feudalism) of the Mamluks and the courtiers who belonged to Al-Malik Al-Muzaffar Rukn al-Din Baybars al-Jashangir, Prince Salar and the rest of the Burji Mamluks, and it amounted to between a thousand dinars and eight hundred dinars, and he feared that the Al-Akhbaz of the aforementioned people would be cut off, so he formed an opinion with Judge Fakhr al-Din Mahammad bin Fadlallah, the supervisor of the army is to ruk the lands of Egypt, establish fiefdoms of what he chooses, and write down royal examples in them. So Al-Fakhr came forward, supervisor of the army, and made papers across the regions and their areas.”

== Al-Ruk al-Nasiri procedures ==
Al-Maqrizi detailed the mechanism that Sultan Mahammad bin Qalawun followed to create the Al-Ruk al-Nasiri. He mentioned that he appointed four groups of Mamluk princes with whom he sent writers and surveyors to create the new ruk, which are:

1. Prince Bahr al-Din Jekyll bin al-Baba group for the ruk of the Gharbia Province.
2. Prince Izz al-Din Idmar al-Khatiri's group for the ruk in the Sharqia Province.
3. Prince Balban Al-Sarkhadi group for the ruk in Menoufia and Beheira District.
4. Balili and Martini group for Upper Egypt.

These groups examined lands and crops, and estimated their Kharaj. Al-Maqrizi also mentioned that the new ruk was built in 75 days, after which Sultan Al-Nasir determined the lands whose Kharaj would be allocated to the Sultan, and who would allocate them to the Mamluk princes.
