= Ottoman square =

Survey of Egyptian lands during Ottoman rule

The Ottoman square (Turkish: Osmanlı Meydanı), (Egyptian Arabic: التربيع العثماني) is a term given to the process of surveying Egyptian lands conducted by the Ottoman rule between the years 930 AH – 932 AH (1524 AD – 1527 AD). The Ottoman square replaced the common ruk in the Mamluk era.

== History ==
After the Ottomans occupied Egypt, Sultan Suleiman the Magnificent ordered a new survey for Egyptian lands in the year 930 AH, and it was completed during the reign of the governor Hadım Suleiman Pasha and under Prince Kiwan in the year 933 AH.

The book "Description de l'Égypte" became the only reliable source for studying the Ottoman square, due to the lack of specialized sources about the Ottoman square, unlike the Mamluk era, as scholars of the French campaign in Egypt recorded 16 administrative regions (states) in Egypt, half of which were in Upper Egypt and the other half in Lower Egypt. No Ottoman square notebooks were found in the year 933 AH, so researchers had to resort to cross-referencing records before and after to determine what had changed.

The Ottoman square were square-shaped lists of paper in which the area of each village was written. They were added together in books, known as the square books, and were relied upon to estimate princely funds and list the names of villages in the Ottoman era. Ottoman squares are another type that differs from the squares that were relied upon in the Mamluk era. The square is a square-shaped document given to every fiefdom holder, in which his name and the amount of his fiefdom were recorded.

== Administrative division changes ==
- A new land and Kharaj survey was made, in which the vast lands were divided into small villages, each district having its own jurisdiction. The number of villages, especially in Upper Egypt, increased from the villages of Al-Ruk Al-Nasiri.
- The Mamluk a'mal were abolished and were replaced by wilayat or vilayat (state). The Egyptian lands were divided into 13 states (6 in Upper Egypt and 7 in Lower Egypt).
- The establishment of the wilayat Girga and included the a'mal al-Assiutiya wa al-Akhmimyia wa-Qusia.
- The establishment of the wilayat Giza after separating the a'mal al-Gizyia from Upper Egypt and its annexation to Lower Egypt.
- Lower Egypt now includes the wilayat of: Qalyubia, Sharqia, Dakahlia, Gharbia, Menoufia, Beheira, and Giza.
- Upper Egypt now includes the wilayat of: Atfihiyah, Fayoumiya, Bahnasawiyah, Ashmunin, Manfalutiyya, and Girga.
- This is in addition to 6 governorates: Alexandria, Rasheed, Damietta, Al-Arish, Suez, and El Qoseir.
- The number of (النواحي) districts reached 2917 districts, thus 634 villages increased from the lands of Al-Ruk Al-Nasiri, of which 451 districts were new in Upper Egypt and 183 in Lower Egypt.

== Administrative arrangement ==
At the head of each state was a kashif (ruler), at the head of each governorate was a governor, and at the head of Cairo (the seat of the Ottoman wali/governor) was Sheikh al-Balad, the chief Mamluk prince who held the title of Sanjak.

== Al-Kushofiyat ==
Al-Kushofiyat (الكشوفيات) were established in the Ottoman square and served as the smaller Kouras or the largest area. On his journey, Vansleb recorded 36 Kushofia (كشوفية), each headed by a kashif, which were divided into:

- 24 Kushofiyat in Upper Egypt (wilayat Girga).
- 6 Kushofiyat in Middle Egypt.
- 6 Kushofiyat in Lower Egypt.

== Recording of the French campaign ==
The French campaign recorded in the "Description de l'Égypte" 16 administrative regions (أقاليم إدارية), half of which were in Upper Egypt and the other half in Lower Egypt, as follows:

=== Upper Egypt ===
1. Thebes or Qena region: from Kalabsha, before the waterfall, to Faw Bahri Dishna.
2. Girga region: From the main one in Dishna Center to Shandawil in Sohag Center.
3. Assiut Region: From Basouna Bahri, Saliba Al-Smarna, to Nazali Janoub, Al-Qusiya.
4. Minya Region: from Al-Qusiya to Itsa in Samalut center.
5. Beni Suef Region: from Al-Bayhu in Samalut center to the last borders of the Al-Wasiti al-Bahria center.
6. Fayoum Region: with its current borders.
7. Atfih Region: On the eastern bank of the Nile: from Al-Matahara Al-Bahariyya in the Minya center to Deir Al-Tin (Al-Basateen), before Old Egypt.
8. Giza Region: From the Al-Ayat center to Abu Al-Khawi in the Kom Hamada center.

=== Lower Egypt ===
1. Qalyoub Region: From Athar al-nabi to Bahr Muwais in the Banha center.
2. Al-Sharqiya Region: its borders until 1912, that is, before the establishment of the Banha Center.
3. Mansoura Region: from Asnit in the Banha center to Al-Mahallaba in the Manzala center.
4. Damietta Region: Faraskour Center and Al-Manzala from Dakahlia, except Al-Kurdi to Al-Gamaleya, Sherbin Center and the sea half of Talkha Center in Gharbia.
5. Gharbia Region: with its old borders before the amendment in 1898, except for the center of Sherbin and Bahri Talkha.
6. Menouf Region: According to its old borders before 1897.
7. Rashid Region: Fuwwah center and the maritime half of Desouk from Kafr El-Sheikh and Mahmoudiyah from Beheira.
8. Beheira Region: its borders, except for the Rashid center.

The French also reduced the number of Lower Egypt regions/provinces to eight, down from 11 provinces. They eliminated the Nastrawah province, which extends on the Mediterranean coast, and added its western part to Rosetta, which was made instead of the Fuwwah province. They annexed the rest of the Nastrawah province to the Gharbiya region, and added the northeastern part of the Gharbiya province. And the northwestern part of the Dakahlia region to Damietta. They added the port of Alexandria to the lake, the suburbs of Cairo to the Qalyubia region, then they added the southern part on the shore of the Western Nile up to the town of Abu al-Khawi to the Giza region.
