= Tarif al-Matghari =

Tarif al-Matghari (Berber languages: Tarif Ametɣar, Arabic: طريف المطغري) (b. ? -744) was the founder of the Berber Barghawata dynasty in the Tamesna region in what is today Morocco. He was the father of the self-proclaimed prophet and king Salih ibn Tarif. It is believed that he was born in the area of Barbate, near Cádiz in Spain.
