= Muhammad ibn Wasul =

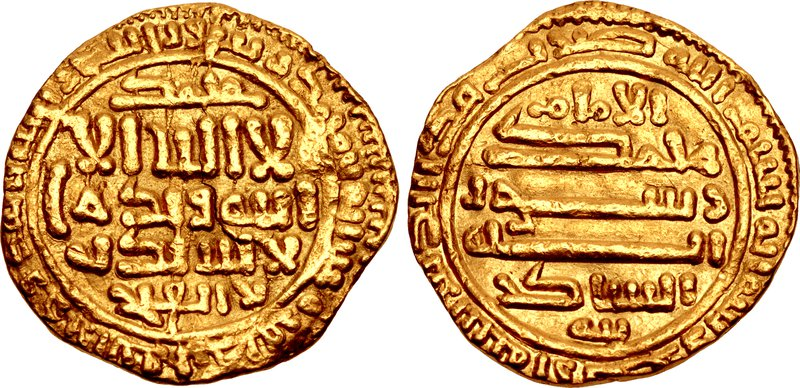
- Gold dinar minted by Muhammad ibn Wasul

Emir of Sijilmasa
- Reign: 942/943–958
- Predecessor: al-Muntasir Samgu ibn Muhammad
- Successor: Unknown governor (appointed by the Fatimids)
Names
- Muhammad ibn al-Fath Wasul ibn Maymun al-Amir
- Dynasty: Banu Midrar
- Father: al-Fath Wasul ibn Maymun al-Amir
- Religion: Maliki

Muhammad ibn al-Fath Wasul ibn Maymun al-Amir (Arabic: محمد بن الفتح واسول المدراري) (r. 942/943–958) was the tenth Midrarid emir of Sijilmasa. He was the first Midrarid ruler to adopt Maliki Sunni Islam.

== Biography ==
He was a son of al-Fath Wasul ibn Maymun al-Amir (r. 909–913), and cousin of his predecessor, al-Muntasir Samgu ibn Muhammad and was an enemy of the Fatimids and supporter of the Caliphate of Córdoba.

It is known that he served in the Umayyad armies in al-Andalus at the Battle of Simancas on August 1, 939, and had converted to Maliki Sunnism, the prevailing madhhab on the Iberian Peninsula. He carried out a coup in 942–943 against the 13-year-old al-Muntasir and his grandmother who acted as regent, and took the power; al-Muntasir was imprisoned.

Considered a partisan of the Umayyads, his assumption of power alarmed the Fatimid Caliph. Muhammad sought the support of the Berbers to make war on the Fatimids. He assumed the caliphal title of amir al-mu'minin and the regnal title al-Shakir li-llah ("the grateful one toward God") and from 944 to 950 started minting coins called mathaqil shakiriyya. These moves irritated the Fatimid government, which decided to put an end to it.

The caliph al-Mu'izz li-Din Allah sent the general Jawhar against Sijilmasa. The general, when he arrived, addressed the notables, demanding the delivery of Ibn Wasul, but they refused; despite this, Ibn Wasul left the city with his family and treasures and his most loyal supporters, towards the fortress of Tasagdalt. On September 958, Jawhar entered the city without fighting and changed the shakiriyya coins to Fatimid coins. Ibn Wasul left his refuge and approached the city to see what was happening. He was recognized by a member of the Matghara tribe, who handed him over to Jawhar, and on October of the same year, Ibn al-Fath was taken prisoner, chained, and sent to al-Mansuriyya with the Maghrawa emir of Fez, Ahmad ibn Bakr, captured at the same time, and some children of the notables of the city of Sijilmasa as hostages. They arrived in al-Mansuriyya on November 959. He was confined in a castle and received a humiliating treatment by being taken around in a cage.

Jawhar appointed a governor whose name was not known, but shortly after leaving the city he was expelled by the rebellious population who proclaimed again the al-Muntasir Samgu ibn Muhammad.

== Sources ==
- Love Jr, Paul M. (2010-06-01). "The Sufris of Sijilmasa: toward a history of the Midrarids". The Journal of North African Studies. 15 (2): 173–188. doi:10.1080/13629380902734136. ISSN 1362-9387. S2CID 145419823.
- Messier, Ronald A.; Miller, James A. (2015). The Last Civilized Place: Sijilmasa and Its Saharan Destiny. University of Texas Press. ISBN 9780292766655.
- Pellat, Charles (1991). "Midrār". In Bosworth, C. E.; van Donzel, E. & Pellat, Ch. (eds.). The Encyclopaedia of Islam, Second Edition. Volume VI: Mahk–Mid. Leiden: E. J. Brill. ISBN 978-90-04-08112-3.

Preceded by al-Muntasir Samgu ibn Muhammad	Midrarid emir of Sijilmasa; 942/943–958	Vacant Fatimid rule Title next held by al-Muntasir Samgu ibn Muhammad
