= Khalid ibn Abi Habib al-Fihri =

Khalid ibn Abi Habib al-Fihri خالد بن أبي حبيب الفهري
- Died: 740; Shalaf Valley, near Tangier
- Allegiance: Umayyad Caliphate
- Battles / wars: Berber Revolt: Battle of the Nobles (740) †

Khalid ibn Abi Habib al-Fihri (Arabic: خالد بن أبي حبيب الفهري) (?-October, 740) was an Arab military commander in North Africa during the Berber Revolt, who led the Arab army that was defeated at the Battle of the Nobles in late 740. The chronicles are oddly ambiguous on the biographical details of Khalid ibn Abi Habib. It is acknowledged (e.g. Ibn Khaldun, p. 360) that he was a member of the illustrious Fihrid family, descendants of the great Arab conqueror Uqba ibn Nafi al-Fihri. The patronymic structure suggests Khalid is the son of the father of Habib, which would imply that it is likely Khalid was the brother of Habib ibn Abi Ubayda al-Fihri, the principal military commander of Ifriqiya. But this is not confirmed. (Note: If it is indeed true that Khalid and Habib were brothers, then their different patronyms (Ibn Abi Habib and Ibn Abi Ubayda respectively) might have been introduced merely as a convenient distinguishing device to avoid confusing the brothers. Abu Habib and Abu Ubayda are the same person - their father (cf. Fihrid family). However, in his chronicle, Ibn Khaldun, departs momentarily from this usage and writes (p.360) that 'Ibn Abi Ubayda' fell at the Battle of the Nobles. This is not an error but technically correct (as Abu Ubayd was indeed Khalid's father). Nonetheless, this seems to have led some careless readers to assume Ibn Khaldun meant Habib and consequently confuse the Battle of the Nobles (Khalid's death, 740) with the Battle of Bagdoura (Habib's death, 741).)

When the Berber Revolt of Maysara al-Matghari broke out in Morocco in 740, the bulk of the Ifriqiyan army, under the commander Habib ibn Abi Ubayda al-Fihri was overseas, on campaign in Sicily. The governor of Ifriqiya Ubayd Allah ibn al-Habhab immediately dispatched instructions to Habib break off the expedition and ship the army back to Africa. But this would take time, and the rebels had, in the meantime, taken Tangiers and seized the whole length of Morocco. To keep the Berber rebels in check until the Sicilian expedition army returned, Obeid Allah assembled a cavalry-heavy column composed largely of the aristocratic Arab elite of Kairouan, and placed it under the command of Khalid ibn Abi Habib. This column was dispatched immediately to Tangiers and instructed to serve as the vanguard until the Sicilian expeditionary force under Habib disembarked and caught up with them.

Khalid ibn Abi Habib encountered the Berber rebel army in the outskirts of Tangiers, and after a couple of skirmishes, forced them to pull back. As per the instructions he was given, Khalid held his position south of Tangiers, awaiting the reinforcements from Sicily. But before junction could be made, the Berber rebel army, under a new commander, Khalid ibn Hamid al-Zanati, fell upon the Arab column in October/November 740. Khalid ibn Abi Habib and his column, the flower of the Ifriqiyan nobility, was annihilated by the Berbers in what became known as the Battle of the Nobles.

== See also ==
- Fihrids
- Battle of the Nobles
- Berber Revolt

== Sources ==
- Ibn Khaldun, Histoire des Berbères et des dynasties musulmanes de l'Afrique, 1852 trans., Algiers.
