= Ash (deity) =

Ancient Egyptian deity

- Ash as depicted in seals of Peribsen
Name in hieroglyphs
A S C7
- Major cult center: Memphis (presumably)
- Symbol: Wine, Vineyards

Ash or Yuc (Tamazight: ⵢⵓⵛ, romanized: Yuc, IPA: [jʊʃ]) was an Amazigh sky god worshipped by the Libyan and Tehenu tribes of the Western Desert, an area of desert that lies west of the Nile River. He was regarded as the "Lord of the Tehenu" by the Ancient Egyptians.

In particular, he was identified by the ancient Egyptians as the god of the vineyards of the western Nile Delta and thus was viewed as a benign deity. Flinders Petrie in his 1923 expedition to the Saqqara (also spelt Sakkara) found several references to Ash in Old Kingdom wine jar seals: "I am refreshed by this Ash" was a common inscription.

In Egyptian mythology, as god of the oases, Ash was associated with Set, who was originally a god of the desert. The first known reference to Ash dates to the Protodynastic Period, and he continued to be mentioned as late as the 26th Dynasty.

Ash was usually depicted as a human, whose head was one of the desert creatures, variously being shown as a lion, vulture, hawk, snake, or the unidentified Set animal.

Some depictions of Ash show him as having multiple heads, unlike other Egyptian deities, although some compound depictions were occasionally shown connecting gods to Min. In an article in the journal Ancient Egypt (in 1923), and again in an appendix to her book, The Splendor that was Egypt, Margaret Murray expands on such depictions, and draws a parallel to a Scythian deity, who is referenced in Sebastian Münster's Cosmographia universalis.

The idea of Ash as an import god is contested, as he may have been the god of the city of Nebut, now known as Naqada, before Set's introduction there. One of his titles is "Nebuty" or "He of Nebut", indicating this position.

Ash is sometimes seen as another name for Set.
