= Miknasa =

Zenata Berber tribe

The Miknasa (Berber: Imeknasen) was a Zenata Berber tribe of the Maghreb.

== History ==
The Miknasa Berbers historically populated the Aurès and are part of the Dharisa tribe belonging to Botr who descended from Madghis, coming from the Aures mountains in Algeria. The Aures and the regions north of it were traditionally the home of the Miknasa, they were also mentioned to have been situated there by Ibn Khaldun, Al Yaqubi and Al Bakri at the time of the foundation of Tahert. In antiquity Ptolomey referred to three groups who had inhabited a certain mountain range which can now be identified as the Ouarsenis, one of these three peoples were the Μυκίνοι who were most likely the Miknasa, Edrisi had also mentioned the Miknasa as one of the tribes that inhabited the Ouarsenis.

After defeat by the Umayyads, many of the Miknasa converted to Islam. In 711, members of the tribe took part in the conquest of the Visigothic Kingdom under Tariq ibn Ziyad. They settled north of Córdoba and in the 11th century founded the Aftasid dynasty in Badajoz.

Another group of the Miknasa took part in the successful massive Berber Revolt led by Maysara al-Matghari in 739–742 against the Umayyad Arabs, and managed to wipe out the Umayyad Arab presence in Morocco and Algeria. The Berber principality Banu Midrar is named after Abul-Qasim Samku ibn Wasul, nicknamed Midrar, a Miknasa Berber who was said to take part in the Berber Revolt. The principality of the Banu Midrar was founded by Miknasa who came from the Aures massif, and at the time were nomads south of Tiaret. The Miknasa adopted Kharijism-Islam and established the Emirate of Sijilmasa, under the Midrarid dynasty, on the northern edge of the Sahara in 757. This became very wealthy as the western end-point of the Trans-Saharan trade route with the Sudan. In alliance with the Caliphate of Córdoba, it was able to fight off the attacks of the Fatimids. However, when the Miknasa chief Al-Mutazz allied himself with the Fatimids, the Miknasa were driven out of Sijilmasa by the Maghrawa, who were allies of the Umayyads.

A further group of Miknasa were allied with the Fatimids against the Umayyads, and overthrew the Rustamids of Tahert in 912 and drove the Salihids from northern Morocco in 917. But they could not maintain their resistance to the Maghrawa in northern Morocco permanently, and, weakened by the struggle, they were subdued by the Almoravids in the 11th century.

== Toponyms ==
The modern Moroccan city of Meknes, which took its name from them, bears witness to their presence, as does the Spanish town of Mequinenza.

== See also ==
- Aftasid dynasty
- Berber Revolt
- al-Mu'tazz
