= Rük =

- Location within Azerbaijan
- Coordinates: 41°08′49″N 48°20′44″E
- Country: Azerbaijan
- Rayon: Quba
- Municipality: Söhüb
- Time zone: UTC+4 (AZT)
  - Summer (DST): UTC+5 (AZT)

Rük (also, Ryuk) is a village in the Quba Rayon of Azerbaijan. The village forms part of the municipality of Söhüb.
