= Maysara al-Matghari =

Berber chieftain and military commander

Maysar al-Matghari ميسرة المطغري
- Amir al-Mu'minin
- Reign: 739–740
- Successor: Khalid ibn Hamid al-Zanati
- Born: Unknown
- Died: September/October 740; Tangiers region, present-day Morocco
- Religion: Sufrite sect
- Occupation: Rebel leader
- Military career
- Allegiance: Rebellion
- Conflicts: Great Berber Revolt (739–743)

Maysar al-Matghari (Berber: Maysar Amteghri or Maysar Amdeghri, Arabic: ميسرة المطغري; sometimes rendered Maisar or Meicer; in older Arab sources, bitterly called: al-Ḥaqir ('the ignoble'); died in September/October 740) was a Berber rebel leader and original architect of the Great Berber Revolt that erupted in 739-743 against the Umayyad Muslim empire. However, he was deposed by the rebels, replaced with another Berber leader, and died or possibly was executed by them in 740. The Berber Revolt succeeded 3 years after his death in defeating the Umayyad armies.

== Background ==
Maysara Amteghri takes his surname from the Berber tribe Imteghren. The exact biographical details of Maysara are obscure, and made more complicated by what are likely scurrilous stories circulated by his enemies. Chroniclers have recorded allegations that Maysara was a low-born Berber water-seller in Kairouan or Tangiers, possibly a water-carrier in the caliphal army. Chronicles routinely refer to him by the unflattering label of al-Hakir, 'the Ignoble' or 'the Vile'. Ibn Khaldun, however, was probably closer to the truth in proposing that his origins were perhaps not so humble, that Maysara was probably a significant chieftain or sheikh of the Berber Matghara tribe. Al-Tabari reports that Maysara had even headed a Berber delegation to Damascus to present the Berber complaints before the Caliph Hisham.

And the complaints were many. The Berbers had long resented the second-class status accorded to them by the ruling Umayyad-Arab military caste. Berber Muslims were intermittently subjected to extraordinary taxation and slave-tributes, contrary to Islamic law. As a result, many Berbers grew receptive to puritan Kharijite activists, particularly those of the Sufrite sect, that had begun arriving in the Maghreb, preaching a new political order in which all Muslims would treated without regard for ethnicity or tribal status. Maysara's Matghara tribe had been particularly taken up with Sufrite influence.

== The Revolt ==
In the late 730s, the new Umayyad governor Ubayd Allah ibn al-Habhab of Ifriqiya ratcheted up his fiscal exactions. His regional deputies, notably Omar ibn al-Moradi, governor of Tangiers, implemented some inventive and highly oppressive schemes to extract more revenues from the Berbers.

By 739 or so, the main Berber tribes under Omar's jurisdiction in western Morocco - principally the Ghomaras, Berghwata and Miknasa—decided they had enough and prepared for rebellion. They formed an alliance and elected the Matghara chieftain Maysara to lead them. It was not a spontaneous uprising. Maysara and the Berber commanders seemed to have been careful enough to wait until the bulk of the Ifriqiyan army had left North Africa on an expedition to Sicily before springing into action.

In early 740, the Ifriqiyan army safely gone, the Great Berber Revolt finally began. Maysara assembled his coalition of Berber armies, heads shaven in the Kharajite fashion, Qur'ans hanging from their spears, and led them bearing down on Tangiers. The city quickly fell into their hands and the hated governor Omar al-Moradi was put to death.

Maysara placed the Berber garrison in Tangiers under the command of a converted Christian, Abd al-Allah al-Hodeij al-Ifriqi, then proceed to sweep down western Morocco, overwhelming Umayyad garrisons clear down to the Sous valley. In a very short time, the whole length of western Morocco, from the Straits of Gibraltar to the Anti-Atlas, were in the hands of Maysara's rebels.

== The Berber Caliph ==
After his victory at Tangiers (or perhaps a little earlier), it is said that Maysara took up the title of Amir al-mu'minin ('Commander of the Faithful', or 'Caliph'). This was probably the first time that a non-Arab laid claim to the supreme Muslim title. Indeed, it might have been the first time anyone not connected by blood to the Prophet's Quraish tribe, had dared lay such a claim. To orthodox Muslims of the time, the idea of a 'Berber caliph' must have seemed like an absurdity. The rumor that Maysara was a lowly 'water-carrier' probably got started around this, if only to make the caliphal pretension seem even more self-aggrandizingly ridiculous, and consequently the entire rebellion misguided.

Because this step seemed to open the rebels to mockery, some have wondered whether the story of Maysara taking up the caliphal title was not fabricated, from start to finish, by Umayyad propagandists. However, one needs to remember that this rebellion was fired up and led by Sufrite Kharijites. And one of the central tenets of Kharijite ideology is precisely that the caliphal title is open to any good pious Muslim, regardless of dynastic or tribal qualifications. Moreover, one must keep in mind this was, at least on the ideological plane, a Muslim uprising, open to all true Muslims, and not a Berber liberation movement. Consequently, Maysara, as the commander of the true Muslims, could have no other title but 'caliph'.

== The Fall of Maysara ==
Maysara's star dimmed not long after this. The Umayyad governor Obeid Allah ibn al-Habhab immediately recalled the Ifriqiyan army back from Sicily. While awaiting their return, Obeid Allah assembled and dispatched an Arab column from Kairouan, under Khalid ibn Abi Habib al-Fihri, towards Tangiers, to keep the rebels in check and prevent them from moving east into the middle Maghreb.

This column encountered Maysara's Berber armies somewhere south of Tangiers. The Ifriqiyan force was composed largely of the well-equipped and well-trained noble elite of Kairouan and the Berber rebel armies were not much beyond a foot rabble, but the Berbers outnumbered the Arabs several times over, perhaps as much as ten-to-one. Nonetheless, after a brief skirmish, Maysara ordered the Berber armies to fall back and retreat into Tangiers. The Arab column, following their instructions, did not give pursuit, but held a line south of Tangiers, awaiting the reinforcements from the Sicilian expedition.

In this interlude, the rebel commanders deposed Maysara and, shortly after, executed him. A Zenata Berber chieftain, Khalid ibn Hamid al-Zanati, was elected to replace him.

Most Arab chroniclers (e.g. Ibn Khaldun) argue that Maysara was deposed on account of cowardice, for having hastily ordered a retreat after the skirmish with the Arab column. It has also been said that the puritan Sufrite preachers that accompanied the Beber rebel armies as religious commissars found some flaw in the piety of his character, and declared him unfit to be caliph.

But it may also simply be that politics and inter-tribal jealousies played a role. The chieftains of the Zenata tribes of eastern Morocco, who had belatedly begun to adhere to the rebellion, may have felt that the leadership of the Berber rebellion should pass to them. After all, Maysara's original coalition was composed of Ghomara, Berghwata and Miknasa Berbers of western Morocco. That fight had now been won and the frontline had now moved. Any future campaigns against the Arabs were going to be fought in the territories of the Zenata tribes of the east. And if war is to be conducted in Zenata lands, then armies should be led by Zenata chieftains.

All this, of course, is speculative. But inter-tribal rivalry was rife among the Berbers in 8th-century Maghreb. And it certainly seems that after Maysara's fall, the leadership of the Berber rebellion gravitated rather quickly and firmly into the hands of the eastern Zenata chieftains and their Sufrite preachers. This is not to say that accusations of cowardice and impiety weren't enough to depose Maysara, but perhaps those accusations had some political calculation behind them.

The Zenata chieftains delivered two notable victories over the Arabs - at the Battle of the Nobles in late 740 and again at Battle of Bagdoura in late 741 - giving them a claim of dominance over the alliance. That the original coalition partners - e.g. the Berghwata - were the first to break away from Berber rebel alliance seems an indicator that the post-Maysara state of affairs was not to their liking.

== See also ==
- Berber Revolt

== Sources ==
- Blankinship, Khalid Yahya (1994). The End of the Jihad State: The Reign of Hisham Ibn 'Abd Al-Malik and the Collapse of the Umayyads. SUNY Press. ISBN 0-7914-1827-8
- Ibn Khaldun (1852 transl.) Histoire des Berbères et des dynasties musulmanes de l'Afrique, Algiers.
- Julien, Charles-André, Histoire de l'Afrique du Nord, des origines à 1830, édition originale 1931, réédition Payot, Paris, 1961
- Taha, Abd al-Wahid Dhannun (1989) The Muslim conquest and settlement of North Africa and Spain, London, Routledge.
