= Ruk (area) =

Measuring land in acres and valuing it

Ruk (Egyptian Arabic: الروك) is a Coptic word, from Rosh (Coptic: ⲣⲱϣ), which means measuring the land in acres and valuing it, that is, estimating its degree of fertility in order to estimate the Kharaj on it. Today, ruk corresponds to the process of public surveying (real estate survey) and the process of tax assessment. In contemporary management terminology, it is called loosening and adjusting the reins.

Al-Maqrizi mentions the work of the ruk in the chapter “ذكر قبالات أراضي مصر”, in which he mentions the work of the Kharaj and how to collect it, so he mentions the following: “So when thirty years have passed, they change the year, and do ruk to the entire country, and adjust it in a new way, and add to what is possible for an increase without guaranteeing the country, and decrease In what needs to be reduced from it.” And in the same chapter: “So Al-Afdal Shahanshah addressed: about dissolving all the fiefdoms and do ruk to them, and he informed him that the interest in that would lie with the two fiefdoms and the Diwan because the Diwan obtains for him from these virtues a whole lot by which he obtains a desolate country, so he agreed to that and he dissolved all the feudal lordships and did ruk to them.”

The process of surveying lands was carried out in Egypt periodically due to the annual flooding of the Nile River. In Strabo's Geography, he mentions: “The Nile submerges the land, removing borders and changing appearances. It also does not reach the land, so it falls or the water remains in the low land, so it is not cultivated. As it is in some cases rise until it submerges new land and enters the scope of agricultural land.” As a result of this, the survey process becomes necessary to observe the changes occurring in agricultural areas and record them in the Diwan. Thus, the ruk results represent important documents for knowing the urban areas and agricultural units, as well as the classification of cultivated land according to the degree of its fertility and the amount of the Kharaj and the lesson prescribed for each unit.

The work of ruk was not limited to the lands of Egypt only, but it was also done in the lands of the Levant, as stated in “السلوك لمعرفة دول الملوك ”: “In it, the ruk of the Tripolitan kingdom was carried out by Sharaf al-Din Yaqoub, the supervisor of Aleppo, and its affairs were settled to welcome Ramadan in the year seven hundred and ten of Al-Hilali. Al-Kharaji to receive the maghl in the year seventeen. With this ruk, the fiefs of six Tabalkhana princes, and three fiefs of the Asharawat princes, were abolished, including wedding fees, prison fees, and other taxes, the amount of which was one hundred thousand dirhams and ten thousand dirhams each year. Sharaf al-Din presented the ruk papers to Cairo.”

== Ruk works in Egypt ==
1. At the hands of Ibn Rifa’ah, the Kharaj collector during the caliphate of Al-Walid and his brother Sulayman ibn Abd al-Malik, around the year 97 AH.
2. At the hands of Ubayd Allah ibn al-Habhab during the caliphate of Hisham ibn Abd al-Malik, around the year 110 AH.
3. At the hands of Ahmad ibn al-Mudabbir during the caliphate of Al-Mu'tazz, around the year 253 AH.
4. Al-Ruk al-Afdali at the hands of Al-Afdal Shahanshah during the caliphate of Al-Amir bi-Ahkam Allah, around the year 501 AH.
5. Al-Ruk al-Salahi during the reign of Al-Nasir Salah al-Din al-Ayoubi, around the year 572 AH. It was mentioned by Al-Maqrizi in the first part, in the chapter “ذكر قبالات أرض مصر”.
6. Al-Ruk al-Hossami during the reign of Al-Mansour Hossam al-Din Lajin, around the year 697 AH.
7. Al-Ruk al-Nasiri during the reign of Al-Nasir Mahammad ibn Qalawun, around the year 716. Although Ibn al-Ji’an, in the introduction to his book “التحفة السنية بأسماء البلاد المصرية ,” attributes this ruk to Al-Ashraf Sha'ban, the prevailing opinion is that it is the Nasiri ruk.

== Al-Ruk al-Hossami ==
It is attributed to Sultan Al-Malik Al-Mansour Hossam al-Din Lajin of Egypt, and Al-Qalqashandi mentions the date of Lajin's work in Rajab Al-Fard in the year six hundred and ninety-seven AH. Ibn Iyas mentions that it began working on Monday, the sixth of Jumada al-Awwal, in the same year, and the person in charge of it was a Coptic official called “Al-Taj Al-Tawil”:

"So he began to write lists of the areas of the lands and their names, and showed the results. He was tyrannical to the people, and the princes and the rest of the soldiers became fed up with him, and he became a no-nonsense friend. Some poets even said teasingly about him in poetry. The suburbs of Egypt at that time were divided into twenty-four qirats, of which four qirats were for the sultan, ten qirats for the princes and generals, and ten qirats for all the soldiers. So the Sultan decreed for the aforementioned Al-Taj al-Tawil that ten qirats would suffice for the princes and soldiers, and that the one who complained about the soldiers would be given an additional qirat, and thirteen qirats remained for the sultan. The soldiers complained about this and became upset.

== Al-Ruk al-Nasiri ==
It is attributed to Al-Malik Al-Nasir Mahammad bin Qalawun, and Al-Qalqashandi mentions the date of its working in the year seven hundred and sixteen AH. Al-Maqrizi mentions in his book that the Nasiri ruk began in the year seven hundred and fifteen AH and lasted seventy-five days:

"In the year seven hundred and fifteen, Sultan Al-Malik Al-Nasir Mahammad ibn Qalawun chose to visit the Egyptian lands, to abolish many of the excise taxes, and to allocate for the people of his kingdom a large part of the lands of Egypt..., and he wrote a decree to Prince Bahr al-Din Jekyll ibn al-Baba to go out to the western side, with him Azal al-Hajib, from the book, Al-Makin bin Farwitha, and that Prince Izz Al-Din Idmar Al-Khatiri go to the eastern region, and with him Prince Itamish Al-Majdi, and from the book, Amin Al-Dawla Ibn Qarmut, and that Prince Balban Al-Sarkhadi, Al-Qaliji, Ibn Tarantay, and Baibars Al-Jamdar go to the Menoufia and Beheira region, and that Al-Balili and Al-Martini should go out to Upper Egypt, and he assigned with them a clerk, a surveyor, and a measurer, so they went to where he mentioned, and when each of them went down with his first job, he asked for the sheikhs of each country, its guides, its notaries, its judges, and its records that were in the hands of its inspectors, and examined its revenues of spring, produce, and items, and the amount of what they contained. Of the acreage, its crops, its fallow land, and what is in it of soil, trumpets, plantings, and trees, and the lesson of the area and what is on it for those who cut it, such as crops, chickens, sheep, clover, kiosk, cakes, and other types of hospitality. If all of that is recorded, he begins by measuring that area and determines with the numbers and measurements, and the labor judge determines what appears to be the correct measurement...."
