= Salih ibn Tarif =

Berber king

Salih ibn Tarif (Arabic: صالح بن طريف, romanized: Ṣāliḥ ibn Ṭarīf) was the second king of the Berghouata kingdom, the prophet of a new Abrahamic religion, and the eponymous ancestor of the Oulad Salah tribe of Morocco. He appeared during the caliphate of Hisham ibn Abd al-Malik in 744 AD.

The eleventh century Andalusian scholars Al-Bakri reports that Salih was a Judean (Yahūd) and claimed descent from Simeon son of Jacob, son of Isaac.

He is also said to have claimed to be the final Mahdi, and that Isa (Jesus) would be his companion and pray behind him. He proclaimed that his name in Arabic was Ṣāliḥ, in Syriac Mālik, in Hebrew Rūbyā, and in Berber Werba, and that after him would be no other prophet.

After reaching the age of 47 years, he headed east out of the kingdom, and promised to return in the reign of their seventh king. He told his son Ilyās to support the Umayyads of Andalus and publicly profess Islam, but to reveal his religion when he became powerful enough; the latter was done by his grandson Yūnus.

According to some sources, Ṣāliḥ ibn Ṭarīf regarded himself as a successor to Muhammad, had 10 Ṣahāba (disciples) and many wives, and claimed to be able to speak with the dead and heal the sick.

Other tenets that contrast with Islam include capital punishment for theft, unlimited number of wives a man allowed to have, fasting of the month of Rajab (7th month in lunar calendar) instead of Ramadan (9th month), ten obligatory daily prayers instead of five, differences in how to perform ablution, prayers, and the banning of marriage between cousins. The details of the tenets of Ṣāliḥ's religion are mentioned in many Arabic sources, such as Ibn Hazm, Ibn Khaldun and others.

In Islamic literature, his belief is considered heretical; politically, its motivation was presumably to establish their independence from the Umayyads (in a manner analogous to Kharijism, and earlier Donatism), establishing an independent ideology lending legitimacy to the state. Some modern Berber activists consider him to be Berber and regard him as a hero for his resistance to Umayyad-Arab conquest and his foundation of the Berghouata state.

The religion promoted by Ṣāliḥ was destroyed in the 11th century by the Almoravids.

== See also ==
- List of Mahdi claimants
