= Sufri =

Islamic sect

The Sufris (Arabic: الصفرية aṣ-Ṣufriyya) were Khariji Muslims in the seventh and eighth centuries. The Khawarij were divided into separate groups such as the Sufri, Azariqa, Bayhasiyya, Ajardi, Najdat, and Ibadi. The Sufri and Ibadi sects are considered the most moderate of the Kharijite groups due to their refusal to shed the blood of those who disagree with them. Of all the Kharijite sects, only the Ibadi sect continues to exist today.

In Tlemcen, Algeria, the Banu Ifran were Sufri Berbers who opposed rule by the Umayyad, Abbasid and Fatimid Caliphates, most notably under resistance movements led by Abu Qurra (8th century) and Abu Yazid. In Sijilmassa, Morocco the Midrarids adopted the doctrine.

== See also ==
- Kharijism
- Ibadism
