= 690s =

The 690s decade ran from January 1, 690, to December 31, 699.

== Events ==
=== 690 ===
==== By place ====
====== Britain ======
- King Oswine of Kent is toppled by Wihtred, brother of the late king Eadric of Kent, after a 2-year reign. He takes his lands north of the River Thames, in revenge against the East Saxons (approximate date).

====== Asia ======
- October 16 – Wu Zetian ascends to the throne of the Tang dynasty, and proclaims herself ruler of the Chinese Empire as "Holy and Divine Emperor". She becomes the first and only female "emperor" in 5,000 years of Chinese history. Wu Zetian changes the dynasty's name to the Zhou Dynasty, and begins to murder throne pretendants and ministers who try to oppose her. During her reign she elevates the status of Buddhism above Taoism.

==== By topic ====
====== Entertainment ======
- The approximate date of the earliest known blindfold chess, played by Sa'id ibn Jubayr

====== Religion ======
- Willibrord, Anglo-Saxon missionary, travels from York with 12 Benedictine monks to Westkapelle, (modern Netherlands) to Christianize the pagan Frisians.
- September 19 – Theodore of Tarsus, age 88, dies at Canterbury. He is succeeded by Berhtwald as the 9th Archbishop of Canterbury (approximate date).

=== 691 ===
==== By place ====
====== Europe ======
- King Theuderic III dies and is succeeded by his son Clovis IV, age 9, as sole ruler of the Franks. He becomes a puppet—a roi fainéant—of his uncle Pepin of Herstal, mayor of the palace of Austrasia.

====== Arabian Empire ======
- Battle of Maskin: An Umayyad army under caliph Abd al-Malik defeats the rebel forces in Mesopotamia (modern Iraq). He reconquers the Arabian Peninsula, taking the holy city of Medina.

==== By topic ====
====== Architecture ======
- The Dome of the Rock is completed in Jerusalem (under the patronage of Abd al-Malik) during the Second Fitna, becoming the first work of Islamic architecture.

====== Religion ======
- Wilfrid, abbot of Ripon, tries to make himself bishop of all Northumbria. King Aldfrith seizes many of his Ripon Abbey estates, and proposes to create a bishopric there. Wilfrid is banished and flees to Mercia, where King Æthelred makes him bishop of Leicester.

=== 692 ===
==== By place ====
====== Byzantine Empire ======
- Battle of Sebastopolis: The Byzantine army under Leontius is defeated at Sebastopolis, (modern Turkey) by Arab forces led by Muhammad ibn Marwan. During the battle, a "special military corps" (some 20,000 Slavs) under Neboulos deserts the Byzantine lines, and goes over to the Muslim Arabs.
- Arab–Byzantine War: Muslims conquer Armenia, Iberia and Colchis, the last remaining Byzantine holdings east of the Taurus Mountains. Emperor Justinian II is forced to agree to joint Byzantine-Arab control of Cyprus, in the Eastern Mediterranean Sea (approximate date).

====== Britain ======
- King Ine of Wessex installs his kinsman, Nothelm, as ruler of Sussex. According to Bede, Sussex is subjected to Ine for a number of years.

====== Asia ======
- Empress Wu Zetian regains control of the Kingdom of Khotan in the Tarim Basin (Northwest China).

====== Mesoamerica ======
- The Temple of the Cross at Palenque (Mexico) is constructed to commemorate the rise of King Kʼinich Kan Bahlam II to the throne (approximate date).

==== By topic ====
====== Religion ======
- The Quinisext Council is held in Constantinople; it lays the foundation for the Orthodox canon law. Justinian II suppresses non-Orthodox religious practices, and orders the arrest of Pope Sergius I; the militias of Rome and the Exarchate of Ravenna refuse, and take the pope's side.

=== 693 ===
==== Europe ====
- Sisebert, archbishop of Toledo, leads a rebellion against King Ergica of the Visigoths. He plans to assassinate Ergica and his wife Liuvigoto but fails, and is defrocked and excommunicated.
- April 25 – Sixteenth Council of Toledo: Ergica calls for a council of the church to deal with the security of the kingship. The rebels are anathematised and the Forum ludicum is modified.

==== Britain ====
- King Oshere of Hwicce (sub-kingdom of Mercia) dies after a 13-year reign. He is succeeded by his four sons as apparent joint-kings: Æthelberht, Æthelheard, Æthelweard and Æthelric.
- King Ine of Wessex establishes his West Saxon "Law of Codes", to regain authority in his kingdom. He consolidates Wessex's territory in the western peninsula (approximate date).

====== Central America ======
- May 31 – Kʼakʼ Tiliw Chan Chaak is installed as the new ruler of the Mayan city state of Naranjo in Guatemala at the age of 5-years-old, under the regency of his mother, Wak Chanil Ajaw (Lady Six Sky) of Dos Pilas, and reigns until his death in 720.

==== By topic ====
====== Religion ======
- Earconwald, bishop of London, dies and is succeeded by Waldhere. He is buried at St. Paul's Cathedral, and later revered as a saint.
- Wulfram of Sens attends the assembly of bishops at Valenciennes (Northern France).
- Callinicus I becomes the 71st patriarch of Constantinople, after Paul III.

=== 694 ===
==== By place ====
====== Byzantine Empire ======
- The Mardaites raid Muslim-held territories, from their chief stronghold Hagioupolis, in northern Syria (approximate date).

====== Europe ======
- November 9 – King Ergica of the Visigoths accuses the Jews of aiding the Muslims, and sentences all Jews to slavery.

====== Britain ======
- King Ine of Wessex attacks Kent, and extorts 30,000 pence from its people, in recompense for the murder of King Mul.
- King Sæbbi of Essex abdicates the throne, and is succeeded by his sons Sigeheard and Swæfred (approximate date).

====== Asia ======
- Asuka, imperial capital of Japan, is abandoned by Empress Jitō. She moves her court to Fujiwara-kyō (Nara Prefecture).
- Qapaghan Khan (694–716) succeeds his brother Illterish Khan, as ruler of the Eastern Turkic Khaganate (Central Asia).

=== 695 ===
==== By place ====
====== Byzantine Empire ======
- The population of Byzantium revolts under Leontios, the strategos (military governor) of the Anatolic Theme, and proclaims him emperor. Justinian II is deposed and his nose is cut off (leading to his subsequent nickname of "the Slit-nosed"). He is exiled to Cherson (Crimea), and begins to plot an attempt to retake the throne.

====== Britain ======
- September 6 – King Wihtred of Kent, who maintains Kentish independence against the growing expansion of Mercia, issues one of the earliest known law codes of Britain.
- King Aldfrith of Northumbria marries Princess Cuthburh, sister of King Ine of Wessex (approximate date).

====== Central America ======
- June 15 – Uaxaclajuun Ub'aah K'awiil ("Eighteen Rabbit") becomes the new ruler of the Mayan city state of Copán in Honduras upon the death of Chan Imix K'awiil, and rules until his death in 736.
- The Mayan city state of Tikal defeats Calakmul in what is now Guatemala, ending a centuries-long rivalry, but ushering in another century of warfare that ultimately leads to both cities' abandonment in the 9th century.

====== Europe ======
- Childebert III succeeds Clovis IV as sole king of the Franks. He is the son of Theuderic III and becomes a puppet—a roi fainéant—of Pepin of Herstal, mayor of the palace of Austrasia.
- Pepin institutes his son Drogo as mayor of the palace of Burgundy. His younger son Grimoald II becomes mayor of the palace of Neustria.
- The Saxons defeat the Bructeri between the Lippe and the Ruhr, and occupy Westphalia in Germany (approximate date).

==== By topic ====
====== Religion ======
- November 21 – Willibrord, Northumbrian missionary, becomes the first bishop of Utrecht (Netherlands). He returns to Frisia to preach, and builds numerous churches (approximate date).
- Willibrord establishes a Benedictine training centre for priests and young noblemen. This seminary later becomes Utrecht University.
- Suitbert, Anglo-Saxon missionary, founds a monastery at Kaiserswerth (near Düsseldorf) in Germany (approximate date).

=== 696 ===
==== By topic ====
====== Religion ======
- St. Peter's Abbey is founded by Rupert, bishop of Worms, at Salzburg (modern Austria).

=== 697 ===
==== By place ====
====== Europe ======
- Paolo Lucio Anafesto is elected the first Doge of Venice, which begins its rise as a major power in the Mediterranean Sea. Built up from fishing villages settled by fugitives from the Huns (see 452), the city of Venice occupies some 60 marshy islands (Venetian Lagoon).
- Radbod, king of the Frisians, retreats to the island of Heligoland in the North Sea (approximate date).

====== Britain ======
- Queen Osthryth of Mercia is murdered by her own noblemen. She is buried at Bardney Abbey (Lincolnshire), and later revered as a saint.

====== Arabian Empire ======
- Syrian forces under Al-Hajjaj ibn Yusuf, governor of Iraq, defeat the Persian Kharijites, who have captured the city of Mosul and occupy large parts of Mesopotamia (approximate date).

====== Asia ======
- Empress Jitō abdicates the throne in favor of the 14-year-old Monmu (grandson of late emperor Tenmu). During her 11-year reign she has established the foundations of law in Japan.

====== Mesoamerica ======
- The Mayan city of Bahlam Jol is destroyed by Naranjo as retaliation for rebelling against its suzerain.

==== By topic ====
====== Religion ======
- Council of Birr: The northern part of Ireland accepts the Roman calculations for celebrating Easter. At this synod Adomnán, abbot of Iona (Scotland), promulgates his Cáin Adomnáin ("Law of the Innocents").
- A festival, for the opening of the eyes of Buddhist images, is held in Yakushi-ji Temple in Japan (approximate date).

=== 698 ===
==== By place ====
====== Byzantine Empire ======
- Spring–summer – Arab forces under Hasan ibn al-Nu'man capture Carthage, ending Byzantine rule in North Africa. The defeated Byzantine fleet revolts and proclaims Tiberios III, who deposes Leontios after a brief siege of Constantinople, Byzantine Emperor.
- Autumn–winter – The Byzantine general Heraclius, brother of Tiberios III, crosses the mountain passes of the Taurus Mountains into Cilicia with an army. He launches a campaign in Syria, defeats an Arab force from Antioch, and raids as far as Samosata (modern Turkey).
- Outbreak of bubonic plague in Constantinople, Syria and Mesopotamia: Theophanes the Confessor reports that the plague lasted four months and describes a large number of deaths in Constantinople. Emperor Leontios orders the destruction of a market in the Neorion cargo port of Constantinople, where animals are sold and which is considered to be the source of infected animals brought from Syria. The Arab army is forced to suspend its military operations. According to Syrian sources, the plague in Syria lasted another two years.

====== Europe ======
- Wittiza, son of King Ergica, becomes co-ruler of the Visigoth Kingdom in Hispania (approximate date).

====== Britain ======
- Berhtred, Anglo-Saxon nobleman, is killed leading a Northumbrian army against the Picts. The kingdom of Cait (or Cat) in northern Scotland is absorbed (approximate date).
- Fiannamail ua Dúnchado becomes king of Dál Riata (Scotland), until his death around 700 (approximate date).

====== Arabian Empire ======
- Berber forces led by Queen Kahina ("The Diviner") are crushed by Arab invaders at Aures (Algeria). She has rallied the Berbers since the collapse of Byzantine power (see 647).

====== Asia ======
- Dae Jo-young establishes the kingdom of Balhae in Manchuria (approximate date).
- Khun Lo, a Thai prince, conquers Muang Sua, an early Laotian kingdom.
- Qapaghan Qaghan conquers parts of Transoxiana (Central Asia).
- The festival of first-fruits (Daijo-sai) is held in Japan.

====== Central America ======
- March 24 – Itzamnaaj K'awiil becomes the new ruler of the Mayan city state at Dos Pilas in Guatemala and reigns until 726.

==== By topic ====
====== Religion ======
- Council of Aquileia: The bishops of the diocese of Aquileia decide to end the Schism of the Three Chapters and return to communion with Rome.
- Willibrord, Anglo-Saxon missionary, establishes an abbey at Echternach (Luxembourg), presented to him by Irmina, daughter of King Dagobert II.
- Probable date of Cuthbert's burial behind the altar at Lindisfarne (approximate date).
- Princess Taki is sent to Saikū, as a Saiō of the Ise Shrine (Japan).

=== 699 ===
==== By place ====
====== Umayyad Caliphate ======
- Umayyad troops invade Armenia, and secure the submission of Prince Smbat VI Bagratuni. The South Caucasus becomes a viceroyalty called al-Arminiya, and is divided into four regions: Caucasian Albania, Caucasian Iberia, the area around the Aras River, and Taron (modern Turkey).

====== Asia ======
- June 26 – En no Ozunu, Japanese ascetic, is banished to Izu Ōshima (a volcanic island in the Izu Islands), and accused of confusing the mind of the people with magic. He will be later regarded as the founder of a folk religion called Shugendō.

== Significant people ==
- Abd al-Malik caliph
- Abd al-Aziz ibn Marwan famous governor of Egypt
- Justinian II Byzantine emperor
- Pope Conon of Rome

== Births ==
690

- Ashot III, Armenian prince (approximate date)
- Rhodri Molwynog ap Idwal, king of Gwynedd (approximate date)
- Tassilo II, duke of Bavaria (approximate date)

691

- Hisham ibn Abd al-Malik, Muslim caliph (d. 743)
- Marwan II, Muslim caliph (d. 750)

692

- Gundelina, Frankish abbess

693

- Alfonso I, king of Asturias (approximate date)

694

- Fujiwara no Umakai, Japanese statesman (d. 737)
- Hammad Ar-Rawiya, Arab scholar (approximate date)
- Mildthryth, Anglo-Saxon abbess (approximate date)

695

- Fujiwara no Maro, Japanese statesman (d. 737)
- Herlindis of Maaseik, Frankish abbess (approximate date)
- Kibi no Makibi, Japanese scholar (d. 775)
- Muhammad ibn al-Qasim, Umayyad general (d. 715)
- Ōtomo no Koshibi, Japanese general (d. 777)
- Emperor Shang of Tang, Chinese ruler (or 698)
- Theophilus of Edessa, Greek astrologer (d. 785)
- Zayd ibn Ali, Arab imam and grandson of Husayn ibn Ali (d. 740)

696

- Vijayaditya, king of the Chalukya dynasty (d. 733)
- Kim Gyo-gak, Korean Buddhist monk (d. 794)
- Osred I of Northumbria, King of Northumbria from 705 until his death in 716.

697

- Fang Guan, chancellor of the Tang dynasty (d. 763)
- Guo Ziyi, general of the Tang dynasty (d. 781)
- Osred I, king of Northumbria (approximate date)

698

- Dagobert III, king of the Franks (d. 715)
- Shang, emperor of the Tang dynasty (or 695)
- Wang Changling, Chinese poet and official (d. 756)

699

- Abū Hanīfa, Arab imam and scholar (d. 767)
- Wang Wei, Chinese poet (d. 759)

== Deaths ==
690

- September 19 – Theodore of Tarsus, Archbishop of Canterbury (b. 602)
- Aimé, Swiss bishop and saint
- Amalberga of Maubeuge, Lotharingian saint (approximate date)
- Benedict Biscop, Anglo-Saxon abbot
- Bertha of Val d'Or, Frankish abbess (approximate date)
- Julian, archbishop of Toledo (b. 642)
- Kusaila, Berber leader (approximate date)
- Landrada, Frankish abbess (approximate date)
- Nukata, Japanese poet (b. c. 630)
- Oswine, king of Kent (approximate date)

691

- August 24 – Fu Youyi, official of the Tang dynasty
- November 7 – Cen Changqian, official of the Tang dynasty
- November 7 – Ge Fuyuan, official of the Tang dynasty
- Fithceallach mac Flainn, king of Uí Maine (Ireland)
- Theuderic III, king of the Franks (b. 654)
- Sun Guoting, Chinese calligrapher (b. 646)

692

- Abd Allah ibn al-Zubayr, Arab sahabi (b. 624)
- Asmā' bint Abi Bakr, companion of Muhammad
- Bʼalaj Chan Kʼawiil, a Maya ruler of Dos Pilas (b. 625)
- Two Ewalds, Saxon priests (approximate date)
- Chrothildis, Frankish queen regent

693

- Begga, Frankish abbess (b. 615)
- Bridei III, king of the Picts
- Earconwald, bishop of London
- Fáelchar ua Máele Ódrain, king of Osraige (Ireland)
- Oshere, king of Hwicce (Mercia)
- Paul III, patriarch of Constantinople

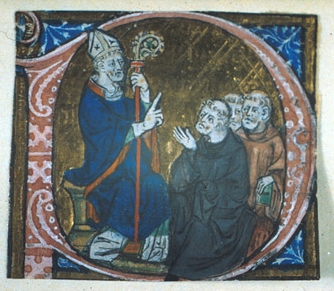
St Erkenwald, Saxon Prince, bishop and saint known as the "Light of London" died in this year

694

- Clovis IV, King of the Franks (b. 677)
- Coenred, king of Dorset (approximate date)
- Rodoald, duke of Friuli (Italy)
- Xue Huai-yi, Chinese Buddhist monk

695

- Ado, duke of Friuli (Northern Italy)
- Ansbert of Rouen, Frankish bishop
- Chan Imix K'awiil, Mayan ruler (ajaw)
- Sæbbi, king of Kent (approximate date)
- Stephen the Persian, chief eunuch and sakellarios of the Byzantine Empire under Justinian II

696

- August 13 – Takechi, Japanese prince (b. c. 654)
- Domnall Donn, king of Dál Riata (Scotland)
- Vinayaditya of Vatapi, king of the Chalukya dynasty and predecessor of Vijayaditya.
- Woncheuk, Korean Buddhist monk (b. c. 613)
- Chlodulf, bishop of Metz (b. 605)
- Aldetrude, Christian saint

697

- Eochaid mac Domangairt, king of Dál Riata
- Ferchar Fota, king of Dál Riata (Scotland)
- Hugobert, Merovingian noblemen (seneschal)
- Nordebert, mayor of the palace of Neustria
- Osthryth, queen of Mercia (English Midlands)

698

- May 6 – Eadberht, bishop of Lindisfarne
- July 22 – Wu Chengsi, nephew of Chinese sovereign Wu Zetian
- Ainbcellach mac Ferchair, king of Dál Riata (Scotland)
- Berthtred, Anglo-Saxon noblemen (approximate date)
- Rieul, bishop of Reims (approximate date)
- Suraqah al-Bariqi, Arab poet (b. 621)
- Trudo, Frankish abbot (approximate date)

699

- Niitabe, Japanese princess
- Ōe, Japanese princess
- Seaxburh of Ely, queen of Kent
- Werburgh, Anglo-Saxon princess
- Yuge, Japanese prince
