= 693 =

Calendar year

693 in various calendars
- Gregorian calendar: 693; DCXCIII
- Ab urbe condita: 1446
- Armenian calendar: 142; ԹՎ ՃԽԲ
- Assyrian calendar: 5443
- Balinese saka calendar: 614–615
- Bengali calendar: 99–100
- Berber calendar: 1643
- Buddhist calendar: 1237
- Burmese calendar: 55
- Byzantine calendar: 6201–6202
- Chinese calendar: 壬辰年 (Water Dragon); 3390 or 3183 — to — 癸巳年 (Water Snake); 3391 or 3184
- Coptic calendar: 409–410
- Discordian calendar: 1859
- Ethiopian calendar: 685–686
- Hebrew calendar: 4453–4454
- Hindu calendars
- Vikram Samvat: 749–750
- Shaka Samvat: 614–615
- Kali Yuga: 3793–3794
- Holocene calendar: 10693
- Iranian calendar: 71–72
- Islamic calendar: 73–74
- Japanese calendar: Shuchō 8 (朱鳥８年)
- Javanese calendar: 585–586
- Julian calendar: 693; DCXCIII
- Korean calendar: 3026
- Minguo calendar: 1219 before ROC 民前1219年
- Nanakshahi calendar: −775
- Seleucid era: 1004/1005 AG
- Thai solar calendar: 1235–1236
- Tibetan calendar: ཆུ་ཕོ་འབྲུག་ལོ་ (male Water-Dragon); 819 or 438 or −334 — to — ཆུ་མོ་སྦྲུལ་ལོ་ (female Water-Snake); 820 or 439 or −333

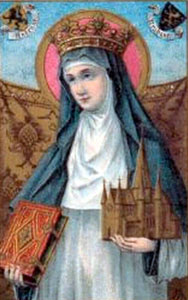
Begga of Landen (615–693)

Year 693 (DCXCIII) was a common year starting on Wednesday of the Julian calendar. The denomination 693 for this year has been used since the early medieval period, when the Anno Domini calendar era became the prevalent method in Europe for naming years.

== Events ==
=== Europe ===
- Sisebert, archbishop of Toledo, leads a rebellion against King Ergica of the Visigoths. He plans to assassinate Ergica and his wife Liuvigoto but fails, and is defrocked and excommunicated.
- April 25 – Sixteenth Council of Toledo: Ergica calls for a council of the church to deal with the security of the kingship. The rebels are anathematised and the Forum ludicum is modified.

=== Britain ===
- King Oshere of Hwicce (sub-kingdom of Mercia) dies after a 13-year reign. He is succeeded by his four sons as apparent joint-kings: Æthelberht, Æthelheard, Æthelweard and Æthelric.
- King Ine of Wessex establishes his West Saxon "Law of Codes", to regain authority in his kingdom. He consolidates Wessex's territory in the western peninsula (approximate date).

==== Central America ====
- May 31 – Kʼakʼ Tiliw Chan Chaak is installed as the new ruler of the Mayan city state of Naranjo in Guatemala at the age of 5-years-old, under the regency of his mother, Wak Chanil Ajaw (Lady Six Sky) of Dos Pilas, and reigns until his death in 720.

=== By topic ===
==== Religion ====
- Earconwald, bishop of London, dies and is succeeded by Waldhere. He is buried at St. Paul's Cathedral, and later revered as a saint.
- Wulfram of Sens attends the assembly of bishops at Valenciennes (Northern France).
- Callinicus I becomes the 71st patriarch of Constantinople, after Paul III.

== Births ==
- Alfonso I, king of Asturias (approximate date; d. 757)

== Deaths ==
- August 20 - Paul III, patriarch of Constantinople
- December 17 - Begga, Frankish abbess (b. 615)
- Earconwald, bishop of London
- Fáelchar ua Máele Ódrain, king of Osraige (Ireland)
- Oshere, king of Hwicce (Mercia)

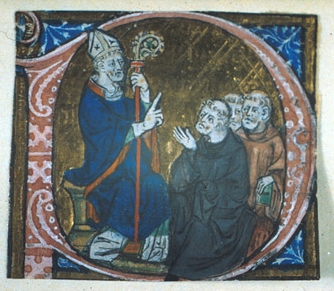
St Erkenwald, Saxon Prince, bishop and saint known as the "Light of London" died in this year
