= Heraclius' Syrian Campaign =

Byzantine offensive circa 700

- Part of the Arab–Byzantine wars
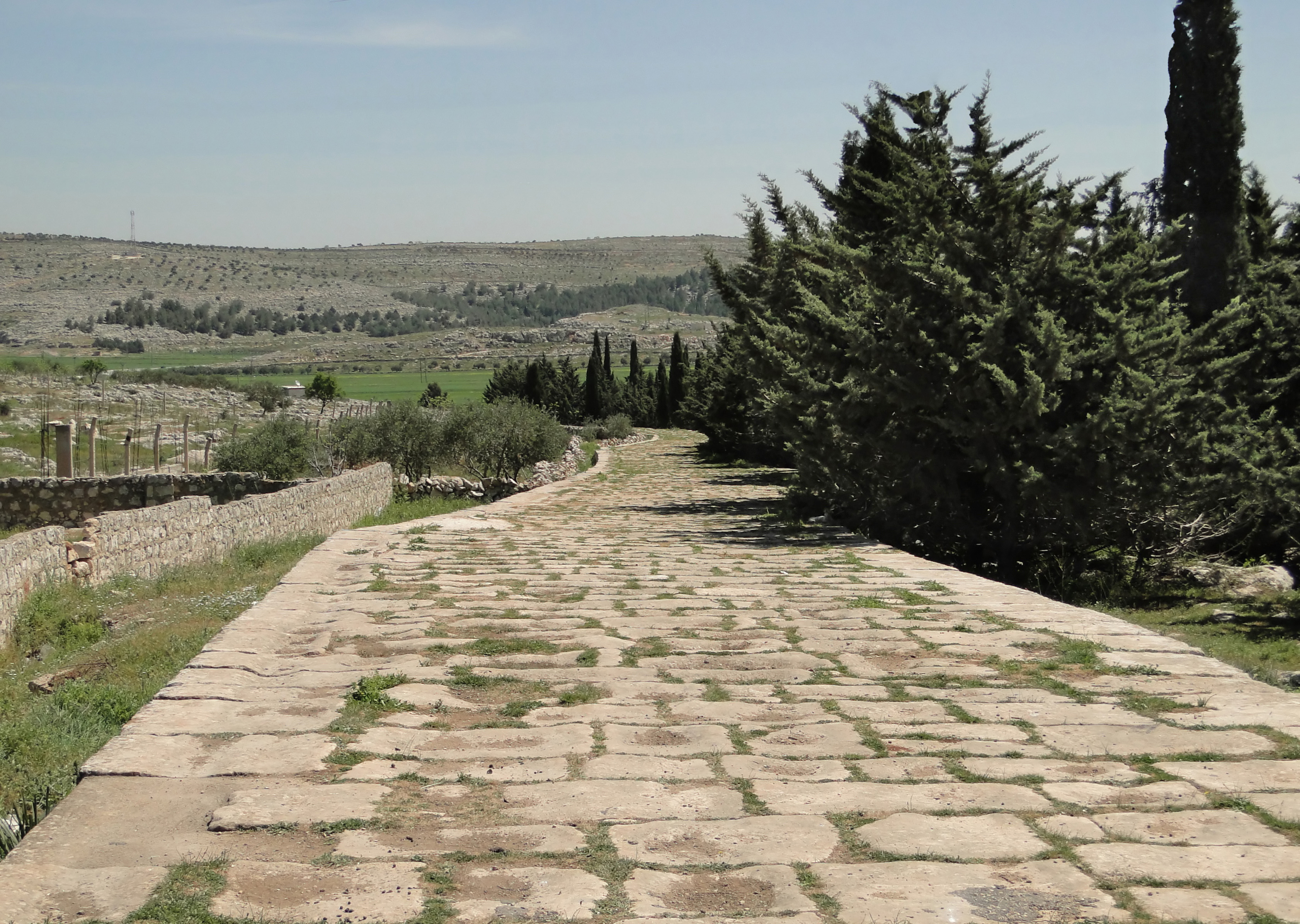
- Ancient road in Syria which connected Antioch and Chalcis
Date	698, 699 or 700/701
Location	Antioch (modern Antakya, Turkey), Umayyad Syria
Result	Byzantine victory

Belligerents
Byzantine Empire	Umayyad Caliphate

Commanders and leaders
Heraclius	Abd al-Malik ibn Marwan

Strength
Cavalry forces from the Anatolian themes	Unknown

Heraclius' Syrian Campaign was a Byzantine offensive led by the brother of the emperor into Umayyad territories in Syria near the turn of the 8th century. Exploiting internal strife within the caliphate, the Byzantines were able to pillage Arab holdings extensively and deal widespread devastation, while also defeating Umayyad armies which attempted to oppose them. The Byzantine army collected vast quantities of plunder, before returning to Anatolia.

== Background ==
In the early 690s, following a period of Byzantine military ascendancy since the reign of Constantine IV, the Umayyad Caliphate under Abd al-Malik ibn Marwan regained the strategic momentum in the Anatolian theatre, with victories at Sebastopolis and Germanikeia. Their advances were aided by the Twenty Years' Anarchy, following the deposition of Emperor Justinian II, which saw unstable leadership, coups and rebellions in the Byzantine Empire. In 698, the Byzantine throne passed to Tiberius III, who was to be aided in military matters by his brother, Heraclius.

The rise of Tiberius had followed a major loss for the empire, when the Umayyad conclusively conquered Carthage, ending Byzantine rule in Africa. However, in the early years of Tiberius' reign the Byzantines gained respite when the Umayyads were forced to transfer forces from the Thughur eastwards, first to restore Umayyad prestige after recent setbacks against the Zunbils, and then to confront the rebellion of Ibn al-Ash'ath, which had erupted due to the harsh rule of Al-Hajjaj ibn Yusuf, who had been appointed to govern the Iranian and Iraqi provinces in 697. The Umayyad army confronting Ibn al-Ash'ath numbered approximately 70,000 men by 701, of whom many had been drawn from Anatolia, along with the veteran general Muhammad ibn Marwan, brother of the caliph. This state of affairs in the caliphate was the probable reason for the lack of Umayyad activity along the Anatolian frontier in 698, in contrast to the intense attacks of previous years.

== Expedition and battles of Antioch and Samosata ==
In order to take advantage of Ibn al-Ah'ath's rebellion, Tiberius appointed Heraclius as monostrategos of the cavalry of the Anatolian themes, and arranged him to conduct a campaign southwards across the cleisurae, into Umayyad territory over the winter. (Note: The year of this expedition is not consensus. Lilie (p.113) dates it to 698 while Treadgold (p.462) puts it in the following year. Crawford (p.384) considers a date at the beginning of the eighth century, between 700 and 701, the likeliest as this also coincides with the climax of Ibn al-Ash'ath's rebellion and the major Umayyad troop transfers to confront him.) As he himself had ascended to the throne through a coup and had yet to secure his rule, Tiberius was likely cautious of the possibility of a militarily successful commander attempting to usurp him. However, as Heraclius was his brother, Tiberius felt able to place a greater degree of confidence in his loyalty. When preparations had been completed, Heraclius marched through Cappadocia and crossed into northern Syria, before winter snows could block the passes over the Taurus Mountains.

The first target of attack for Heraclius was Antioch, which he advanced towards, while pillaging territory along the way. Aware of the Byzantines' advance, the Umayyads assembled an army to intercept Heraclius near the city. The Arabs advanced to confront the Byzantines and were in turn defeated in a pitched battle with large numbers killed and the remnants retreating behind Antioch's walls. However, the number of 200,000 Arabs killed in battle which is recorded in Theophanes' Chronographia is inflated. Heraclius did not attempt to capture Antioch but instead directed his raid eastwards. In the following stages of the expedition, the Byzantines plundered far across Umayyad Syria, taking great amounts of loot and captives. Heraclius raided as far as Samosata, where according to Michael the Syrian, he fought and defeated another Umayyad army, killing a further 5,000 warriors, before retiring to Anatolia with his army and the spoils he had collected.

== Aftermath ==
The Antioch campaign had been a significant success for the Byzantines, however the operation was intermixed with attacks by the Umayyads, which resumed around the same time, both against Anatolia and Armenia. In 700, the Umayyads under Abdallah ibn Abd al-Malik took control of the Armenian fortress of Theodosiopolis, near the frontier of the empire and caliphate. Towards the end of the following year, Muhammad ibn Marwan, who by then had contributed to the Umayyad victory over Ibn al-Ash'ath in Iraq, subdued Armenia in its entirety. In 701 or 702, the Arabs attacked the Byzantine fortress of Taranta in Melitene, though this operation ended in defeat, with the repulsion of the Umayyad army. The mounting Umayyad offensives against Byzantium lead to a major battle against Heraclius' forces at Sis in 704 or 705.

== Bibliography ==
- Crawford, Peter (2021). Justinian II: The Roman Emperor Who Lost his Nose and his Throne and Regained Both. Pen & Sword History. ISBN 978 1 52675 531 5.
- Treadgold, Warren (1997). A History of the Byzantine State and Society. Stanford, California: Stanford University Press. ISBN 978-0804779371.
- Al-Faruque, Muhammad (1986). The Revolt of 'Abd al-Rahman ibn al-Ash'ath:It's Nature and Causes. Islamabad, Pakistan: Islamic Research Institute, International Islamic University.
- Lilie, Ralph-Johannes (1976). Die byzantinische Reaktion auf die Ausbreitung der Araber. Studien zur Strukturwandlung des byzantinischen Staates im 7. und 8. Jhd [The Byzantine Response to the Spread of the Arabs. Studies on the structural change of the Byzantine state in the 7th and 8th centuries] (in German). Munich: Institut für Byzantinistik und Neugriechische Philologie der Universität München. OCLC 797598069.
- Turtledove, Harry (1982). 'The Chronicle of Theophanes' An English translation of anni mundi 6095-6305 (a.p. 602-813), with introduction and notes. Philadelphia: University of Pennsylvania Press. ISBN 0-8122-7842-9.
