= Stoppingas =

Anglo-Saxon tribe

The Stoppingas were a tribe or clan of Anglo-Saxon England. Their domain was Wootton Wawen and the valley of the River Alne in modern-day Warwickshire. The name of the tribe may have come from the personal name Stoppa, who could have been the tribe's founder or leader, or earliest common ancestor.

The Stoppingas formed part of the Saxon kingdom of the Hwicce, which was later conquered and absorbed by the kingdom of Mercia.

In the mid eighth century Æthelbald of Mercia gave a grant of land in the region of the Stoppingas to Æthelric, the son of King Oshere of the Hwicce, for the purpose of establishing a Minster in the territory. Such an institution was subsequently built at Wootton Wawen, and the later parochia of this minster probably represents the extent territory of the Stoppingas.

== Bibliography ==
- Hines, John (2003), The Anglo-Saxons from the Migration Period to the Eighth Century: An Ethnographic Perspective, Boydell Press, ISBN 1-84383-034-5
- Hooke, Della (2005), "Mercia: Landscape and Environment", in Brown, Michelle P.; Farr, Carol Ann (eds.), Mercia: an Anglo-Saxon kingdom in Europe, Continuum International Publishing Group, pp. 161–172, ISBN 0-8264-7765-8
- Kirby, D. P. (2000), The earliest English kings, Routledge, ISBN 0-415-24210-X
- Yorke, Barbara (1995), Wessex in the early Middle Ages, Continuum International Publishing Group, ISBN 0-7185-1856-X
