= Ealdred of Hwicce =

King of Hwicce

Ealdred

Ruler of Hwicce
- Reign: c. 750 – c. 778 AD
- Successor: Æthelmund
- Died: c. 778

Ealdred was styled by Offa of Mercia as Dux (Duke) of Hwicce, though Ealdrēd considered himself King, jointly ruling with his brothers Eanberht and Uhtred in the later half of the 8th century AD.

In 757 Eanberht, Uhtred, and Ealdred, granted land to Bishop Milred, and in 759 to Abbot Headda.

In a 778 charter of Offa, Ealdred is styled as Dux of the Hwicce. In the charter, Ealdred received a grant of land from Offa. It seems that soon after Ealdred's death, Offa absorbed Hwicce but possibly kept Ealdred's relatives as Ealdorman.

== See also ==
- Hwicce

Preceded by Uhtred	King of Hwicce fl. 750s – 778	Succeeded by Title disestablished
