= Cuthswith =

Cuthswith was the abbess of Inkberrow (then Penintanham) in the late 7th and early 8th centuries.

It is possible Cuthswith might have been a relative of the Mercian or Hwiccian royal families, or Oshere's comes Cuthbert. She was initially based in Bath. In the 693–699 charter, Oshere granted Cuthswith 15 hides of land to found a monastery at Inkberrow (called Penintanham in the charter) in the Diocese of Worcester. She acquired a further 5 hides of land from Æthelheard and Æthelweard in the 704–709 charter, suggesting the monastery was successful and that Cuthswith was wealthy. Double monasteries (a term for mixed monk and nun monastic communities) were common in England, but there is no evidence Cuthswith's was a double monastery.

Cuthswith was almost certainly the owner of a 5th-century manuscript of Jerome's Commentary on Ecclesiastes. The surviving manuscript contains an ex-libris in "very early" Old English that reads "Cuthsuuithae. boec. thaerae abbatissan" ("a book of Cuthswith the abbess"), believed to have been inscribed by Cuthswith herself circa 700. Such an inscription is rare for the time; Old English did not have a standard writing system, and very few contemporary Old English texts survive. Latin was the preferred choice for reading and writing, particularly in a religious setting.

In addition, six of the manuscript's leaves were replaced, with a scribe seemingly attempting to reproduce the original uncial script. Elias Avery Lowe and Patrick Sims-Williams called it the "oldest extant uncial manuscript that could have served as a model for the development of 'English uncial' in an English scriptorium".
