= Hassan ibn Atahiyah =

Governor of Egypt for the Umayyad Caliphate for a portion of 745

Hassan ibn Atahiyah حسان بن عتاهية

Umayyad governor of Egypt
- In office 21 March 745 – 7 April 745
- Monarch: Marwan II
- Preceded by: Hafs ibn al-Walid ibn Yusuf
- Succeeded by: Hafs ibn al-Walid ibn Yusuf (Second term)

Personal details
- Died: 750
- Relations: Abd al-Rahman ibn Hassan (grandfather); Hassan ibn Atahiyah (great-grandfather)
- Parent: Atahiyah ibn Abd al-Rahman

Hassan ibn Atahiyah (Arabic: حسان بن عتاهية) (died 750) was a governor of Egypt for the Umayyad Caliphate for a portion of 745.

== Career ==
A member of the clan of Tujib, Hassan was a descendant of another Hassan ibn Atahiyah who had participated in the Islamic conquest of Egypt and been a companion of the Rashidun caliph Umar. His grandfather, Abd al-Rahman ibn Hassan, had served as chief of police (sahib al-shurtah) of Egypt during the governorship of Abd al-Aziz ibn Marwan (r. 685–705).

In 745 Hassan was appointed governor of Egypt by the caliph Marwan ibn Muhammad as replacement for Hafs ibn al-Walid ibn Yusuf al-Hadrami. Arriving in the province in March, he initially attempted to disband the army units that had been raised by Hafs, but this measure was violently rejected by the soldiers and a mutiny quickly broke out. The soldiers declared that they would refuse to recognize any governor other than Hafs and placed Hassan under siege in his house, while others proceeded to the Mosque of Fustat and called for Marwan to be deposed from the caliphate. In the end, both Hassan and the local tax officer were forced to depart from the province and Hafs was restored to power, with Hassan having held the governorship for just sixteen days.

Following his expulsion from Egypt, Hassan made his way to Syria and reported to Marwan what had happened. According to al-Kindi, he later returned to Egypt and was appointed as sahib al-shurtah after Hafs and his supporters were purged by Hawtharah ibn Suhayl; Ibn Taghribirdi on the other hand claims that he remained at the Umayyad court until the time of the Abbasid Revolution. In any case, he fell victim to the revolution following the fall of the Umayyad house in 750; brought before the new governor Salih ibn Ali, he was flogged and subsequently turned over for execution.

== Notes ==
Preceded by Hafs ibn al-Walid ibn Yusuf al-Hadrami	Governor of Egypt; 745	Succeeded by Hafs ibn al-Walid ibn Yusuf al-Hadrami
