= Æthelmod =

Æthelmod was possibly a King of Hwicce, perhaps a son of Osric, reigning jointly with his uncle Oshere. In October 680, Æthelmod granted land to Abbess Beorngyth, but he is not actually styled king in the charter S 1167.
