= Al-Walid ibn Rifa'ah al-Fahmi =

Umayyad governor of Egypt (727–735)

Al-Walid ibn Rifa'ah al-Fahmi الوليد بن رفاعة الفهمي

Governor of Egypt
- In office 727–735
- Monarch: Hisham
- Preceded by: Abd al-Malik ibn Rifa'a al-Fahmi
- Succeeded by: Abd al-Rahman ibn Khalid al-Fahmi

Personal details
- Died: June 735; Fustat, Egypt, Umayyad Caliphate
- Cause of death: illness
- Parent: Rifa'a (father)

Al-Walid ibn Rifa'ah al-Fahmi (Arabic: الوليد بن رفاعة الفهمي) (died June 735) was a governor of Egypt for the Umayyad Caliphate from 727 to 735.

== Career ==
A member of the Qaysite clan of the Banu Fahm, al-Walid initially appears as a chief of security (sahib al-shurtah) for his brother Abd al-Malik ibn Rifa'ah al-Fahmi during the latter's governorship of Egypt from 715 to 717. In 727 Abd al-Malik was again appointed as governor but died a short time afterwards, upon which al-Walid succeeded him and was confirmed in his position by the caliph Hisham ibn Abd al-Malik.

During al-Walid's governorship, Egypt saw the first large-scale settlement of Qaysite Arabs in the province as part of a project overseen by the financial administrator Ubaydallah ibn al-Habhab and the central government. In this same period the government embarked on a province-wide census in order to improve the tax administration, with surveys lasting six months in Upper and three months in Lower Egypt and resulting in the imposition of taxes on all men residing in villages of more than 500 persons. A separate reform, the introduction of a new grain measure, was also ordered upon Egypt by the caliph, but local resistance to the proposal soon resulted in the abandonment of its implementation.

In 735 al-Walid allowed the Copts to build (or re-build) the Church of Saint Menas in the Hamra; this decision was however extremely unpopular with the Muslim population and resulted in an unsuccessful attempt being made on his life. The would-be assassin was apprehended and executed, but his death in turn prompted a period of serious disturbances in Fustat and caused violent fighting to take place on Fustat Island.

Al-Walid died in 735 of an illness, and was succeeded by Abd al-Rahman ibn Khalid al-Fahmi.

== Notes ==
Preceded by Abd al-Malik ibn Rifa'ah al-Fahmi	Governor of Egypt; 727–735	Succeeded by Abd al-Rahman ibn Khalid al-Fahmi
