= Battle of Sis =

704 or 705 Byzantine victory over the Umayyads

- Part of the Arab–Byzantine wars
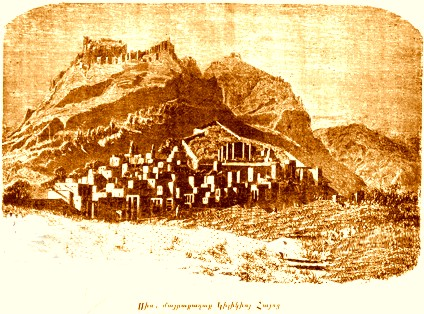
- Drawing of the fortifications at Sis
Date	704 or 705
Location	Sis (modern Kozan, Turkey), Cilicia
Result	Byzantine victory

Belligerents
Byzantine Empire	Umayyad Caliphate

Commanders and leaders
Heraclius	Yazid bin Hunain

Strength
Unknown	More than 12,000

Casualties and losses
Unknown	12,000 killed

The Battle of Sis or Battle of Sisia was fought between the armies of the Byzantine Empire and the Umayyad Caliphate in either 704 or 705, near the town of Sis. The Byzantines led by general Heraclius won a major victory, though this defeat did not decisively thwart the Umayyad advances and territorial gains against Byzantium in the early 8th century.

== Background ==
In the early 8th century a series of difficulties beset the Umayyad Caliphate, with the spread of a plague in its territories and the rebellion of Ibn al-Ash'ath. To confront Ibn al-Ash'ath in Lower Mesopotamia, the Caliph was forced to raise a 70,000-strong army, which included detachments drawn from Anatolia, as well as the veteran commander Muhammad ibn Marwan, brother of Caliph Abd al-Malik. One of the consequences was the destabilization of the Umayyad frontier along the Thughur, which was exploited by the Byzantine forces along the frontier, under the command of Patrikios Heraclius, brother of Emperor Tiberius III.

In 699 or 701, Heraclius benefited from Umayyad difficulties and conducted a devastating invasion of Umayyad territory. In 701 or 702, an Umayyad army under the caliph's son, Abdallah, attacked the Byzantine-held fortress of Taranta in Melitene, which may have served as an base of operations for Heraclius. However, the fortifications and garrison of Taranta repulsed the Umayyad assault. In spite of this failure, Abdallah rebuilt and garrisoned Mopsuestia, thus providing the Umayyads a strong strategic position in Cilicia. Furthermore, the Umayyads made territorial gains soon after this campaign when the Armenian lord Vahan Heptadaimon submitted his province of Sophene to the Arabs.

In 704, the Nakharars in Armenia proper revolted with Byzantine support and defeated the Umayyad forces occupying Armenia, forcing the general Muhammad ibn Marwan (who had returned from Lower Mesopotamia) to campaign in the South Caucasus. Heraclius took advantage of the diversion in Armenia and attacked the Umayyads in Cilicia, wherein he inflicted a heavy defeat on an Arab army under the command of Azar, killing or capturing almost 10,000 Umayyad soldiers. (Note: Because of the similar casualty figures described in this battle and the battle of Sis the following year, and the fact that Azar does not appear in Al-Tabari's account, Peter Crawford (2021, p.386) raises the possibility that Theophanes has duplicated the battle of Sis to a separate engagement the prior year.) However, this victory was counteracted by Umayyad success in Armenia, where Muhammad had forced the Byzantine troops to withdraw and decisively defeated the rebelling Nakharars, following which he executed the captured Armenians by burning them alive.

== Battle of Sis ==
Having subdued the Armenians, the Umayyads were able to refocus their efforts against Byzantine holdings in Cilicia. Yazid bin Hunain was dispatched with a strong army against the Byzantines. Yazid's command is recorded both by Theophanes the Confessor and Al-Tabari, though Al-Tabari dates the campaign to 706, even though Tiberius and Heraclius had been deposed by then. Al-Tabari's account omits details on the result of the ensuing campaign, which historian Peter Crawford considers indicative of an unwelcome reverse for the Umayyads, as described in Theophanes' account.

In 705, Yazid's army advanced into Cilicia against the Byzantine-held stronghold of Sis. The fortress held an important position along the Al-Awasim, as it was positioned at a strategic pass through the Taurus Mountains and was therefore a useful point from which raids could be launched into Anatolia. Maslama, another son of Abd Al-Malik and overall commander of Umayyad forces on this sector of the frontier at the time, sought to capture the location by dispatching his subcommander Yazid to achieve this.

Yazid arrived outside Sis and besieged its fortifications. However, before the Arabs could take the fortress, a Byzantine field army under the command of Heraclius arrived in the region and confronted them. Yazid met them in battle but suffered a resounding defeat in which his army lost 12,000 men. The number of casualties inflicted upon the Umayyads suggests that after their victory, the Byzantines were able to pin a significant part of the Umayyad army against the fort of Sis, resulting in the annihilation of the forces trapped between the garrison and the pursuing army under Heraclius.

== Aftermath ==
The victory at Sis proved to be the final success of Heraclius. Later in 705, the exiled Justinian II returned from Chersonesus and, with Bulgarian support, entered Thrace. Heraclius, by then recalled from the East to confront Justinian, failed to prevent him from seizing Constantinople. Heraclius and Tiberius' troops consequently deserted them, and thereafter the brothers were executed on the orders of the reinstated Emperor.

Over the following years, the Umayyads regained momentum in their offensives against Byzantium. Although the Byzantines won a further victory when a strategos named Marianos defeated an Arab army led by Maimun the Mardaite, they suffered a major strategic reversal with the loss of Tyana to Umayyad forces, between 707–709. With the escalation of the Byzantine internal strife during the Twenty Years' Anarchy in the last years of Justinian II's reign, before his fall in 711, the Umayyads attained numerous successes. Most of Cilicia was subdued to control routes through the Taurus, and the route into the Armeniac Theme was secured with the capture of Kamacha in 711. With Byzantine border defences degraded, the commander Maslamah would conduct a series of devastating expeditions into Anatolia, sacking several major settlements and reaching as far as the Aegean and Bosphorus coasts. These offensives climaxed with the massive Umayyad assault on Constantinople in 717.

== Bibliography ==
- Crawford, Peter (2021). Justinian II: The Roman Emperor Who Lost his Nose and his Throne and Regained Both. Pen & Sword History. ISBN 978 1 52675 531 5.
- Crawford, Peter (2024). Emperor Leo III the Isaurian Imperial Saviour, Christian Icon Breaker?. Pen & Sword History. ISBN 978 1 39907 284 7.
- Treadgold, Warren (1997). A History of the Byzantine State and Society. Stanford, California: Stanford University Press. ISBN 978-0804779371.
- Al-Faruque, Muhammad (1986). The Revolt of 'Abd al-Rahman ibn al-Ash'ath:It's Nature and Causes. Islamabad, Pakistan: Islamic Research Institute, International Islamic University.
- Lilie, Ralph-Johannes (1976). Die byzantinische Reaktion auf die Ausbreitung der Araber. Studien zur Strukturwandlung des byzantinischen Staates im 7. und 8. Jhd [The Byzantine Response to the Spread of the Arabs. Studies on the structural change of the Byzantine state in the 7th and 8th centuries] (in German). Munich: Institut für Byzantinistik und Neugriechische Philologie der Universität München. OCLC 797598069.
- Turtledove, Harry (1982). 'The Chronicle of Theophanes' An English translation of anni mundi 6095-6305 (a.p. 602-813), with introduction and notes. Philadelphia: University of Pennsylvania Press. ISBN 0-8122-7842-9.
