= Ayyub ibn Sharhabil =

Umayyad governor of Egypt (717–720)

Ayyub ibn Shurahbil

Governor of Egypt
- In office 717–720
- Monarch: Umar II
- Preceded by: Abd al-Malik ibn Rifa'a al-Fahmi
- Succeeded by: Bishr ibn Safwan al-Kalbi

Personal details
- Parent: Shurahbil (father)

Ayyub ibn Shurahbil (Arabic: أيوب بن شرحبيل) was the governor of Egypt during the reign of the Umayyad Caliph Umar II (717–720).

On his accession in 717, Umar asked his advisors to name the most suitable men from the Arab settlers (jund) of Egypt so that he could choose one of them as the province's new governor; Ayyub was one of the two men named, and finally appointed to the post. His period of office was marked by Umar's piety-driven reforms, aimed at supporting the Muslims and spreading Islamization across the Caliphate: although the privileges of the Christian Church and the monasteries were confirmed, Christian village headsmen were replaced by Muslims, the sale of wine was prohibited, the jizya became universally enforced, and the pressure to convert to Islam increased.

== Sources ==
- Kennedy, Hugh (1998). "Egypt as a province in the Islamic caliphate, 641–868". In Petry, Carl F. (ed.). Cambridge History of Egypt, Volume One: Islamic Egypt, 640–1517. Cambridge: Cambridge University Press. pp. 62–85. ISBN 0-521-47137-0.

Preceded by Abd al-Malik ibn Rifa'a al-Fahmi	Governor of Egypt; 717–720	Succeeded by Bishr ibn Safwan al-Kalbi
