= Æthelric son of Æthelmund =

Ealdorman of Hwicce

Æthelric
- Earldorman

Ealdorman of the Hwicce
- Reign: 802 - aft. 824
- Predecessor: Æthelmund (Father)
- Father: Æthelmund
- Mother: Ceolburh

Æthelric was an Earldorman. He is thought to have succeeded his father, Æthelmund, as Ealdorman of Hwicce. He is first mentioned in a charter dated 804, where he bequeaths various parcels of land to his mother, Ceolburh, to revert to the Church after her death.

He also appears in a dispute dated 824 between Heahbeorht, Bishop of Worcester and a family living in Berkeley, Gloucestershire regarding land in Westbury-on-Trym, which he rules to be given to the church.

== See also ==
- Hwicce
