= Bishr ibn Safwan al-Kalbi =

Umayyad Provincial governor in 720s

Governor of Egypt
- In office 720–721
- Monarch: Yazid II
- Preceded by: Ayyub ibn Sharhabil
- Succeeded by: Hanzalah ibn Safwan al-Kalbi

Governor of Ifriqiya
- In office 721–727
- Monarchs: Yazid II, Hisham
- Preceded by: Yazid ibn Abi Muslim
- Succeeded by: Ubayda ibn Abd al-Rahman al-Qaysi

Personal details
- Died: 727 Kairouan
- Relations: Hanzalah ibn Safwan al-Kalbi (brother)
- Parent: Safwan ibn Tuwayl

Bishr ibn Safwan al-Kalbi (Arabic: بشر بن صفوان الكلبي; died 727) was a provincial governor for the Umayyad Caliphate, serving in Egypt (720–721) and Ifriqiyah (721–727).

== Career ==
The son of one Safwan ibn Tuwayl, Bishr was an Arab of the Banu Kalb tribe. He and his family traced their genealogy back to the pre-Islamic chieftain Zuhayr ibn Janab.

In 720, Bishr was appointed governor of Egypt by the caliph Yazid ibn Abd al-Malik as a replacement for Ayyub ibn Sharhabil. During his time in that province, he cancelled several measures that had been enacted by his predecessor, including a salary increase for the local Muslims and fiscal exemptions for Christian churches, and implemented a reform of the diwan registers by segregating members of the Quda'ah from those of other tribes. It was also during Bishr's governorship that the city of Tinnis came under attack by the Byzantines, resulting in the deaths of several Muslims there.

In 721, Bishr was ordered by Yazid to establish himself in Ifriqiyah (North Africa) following the murder of its governor Yazid ibn Abi Muslim, and he accordingly set out west, leaving his brother Hanzalah ibn Safwan to govern Egypt in his stead. Upon arriving in the province, he was informed that Abdallah ibn Musa ibn Nusayr had been behind Ibn Abi Muslim's death and wrote to Yazid of the matter. After receiving Yazid's reply that Abdallah should be put to death, Bishr executed him and sent his head on to the caliph. He also proceeded to confiscate Abdallah's property and implemented punitive measures against his former associates.

In 723, Bishr set out from Ifriqiyah to meet the caliph in person, but while en route he learned that Yazid had died and been succeeded by Hisham ibn Abd al-Malik. Bishr therefore presented the new caliph with the tribute that had been meant for Yazid; Hisham responded by re-confirming his governorship over Ifriqiyah, and afterwards sent him to return to the province.

While in Ifriqiyah, Bishr dispatched his commanders on regular campaigns against Byzantine targets in the Mediterranean Sea. Sardinia came under attack in 721 and 727, while in 724 both Sardinia and Corsica were struck; raids against unknown objectives were also made in 722 and 726. Bishr himself led an expedition against Sicily which resulted in the acquisition of spoils, but this offensive ended badly when storms overtook his fleet and caused much of his army to perish.

Bishr died in Kairouan of disease in 727, and was afterwards replaced with Ubayda ibn Abd al-Rahman al-Qaysi.

== Notes ==
Preceded by Ayyub ibn Sharhabil	Governor of Egypt; 720–721	Succeeded by Hanzalah ibn Safwan al-Kalbi
Preceded by Muhammad ibn Yazid	Governor of Ifriqiyah; 721–727	Succeeded by Ubaydah ibn Abd al-Rahman al-Qaysi
