= Weorgoran =

Anglo-Saxon group

The Weogoran (Old English: "people of the winding river") were a people of Saxon England, a precursor of the minor kingdom of Hwicce. The Weogoran were centred on Worcester (Weogoran ceaster). They were probably (though not certainly) West Saxons and occupied the area some time after the defeat of the Britons at the Battle of Dyrham in 577. The settlement was elevated to a bishopric in 680.
