= Eanberht of Hwicce =

King of Hwicce

Eanberht

King of Hwicce ?
- Reign: c.750 – c.778 AD
- Died: c.778

Eanberht was king of Hwicce, he reigned jointly with Uhtred and Ealdred.

In 757 Eanberht, Uhtred, and Ealdred, granted land to Bishop Milred, and in 759 to Abbot Headda.

== See also ==
- Hwicce

Preceded by Æthelric	King of Hwicce fl. 750s	Succeeded by Uhtred
