= Osric of Hwicce =

7th-century Anglo-Saxon king of Hwicce

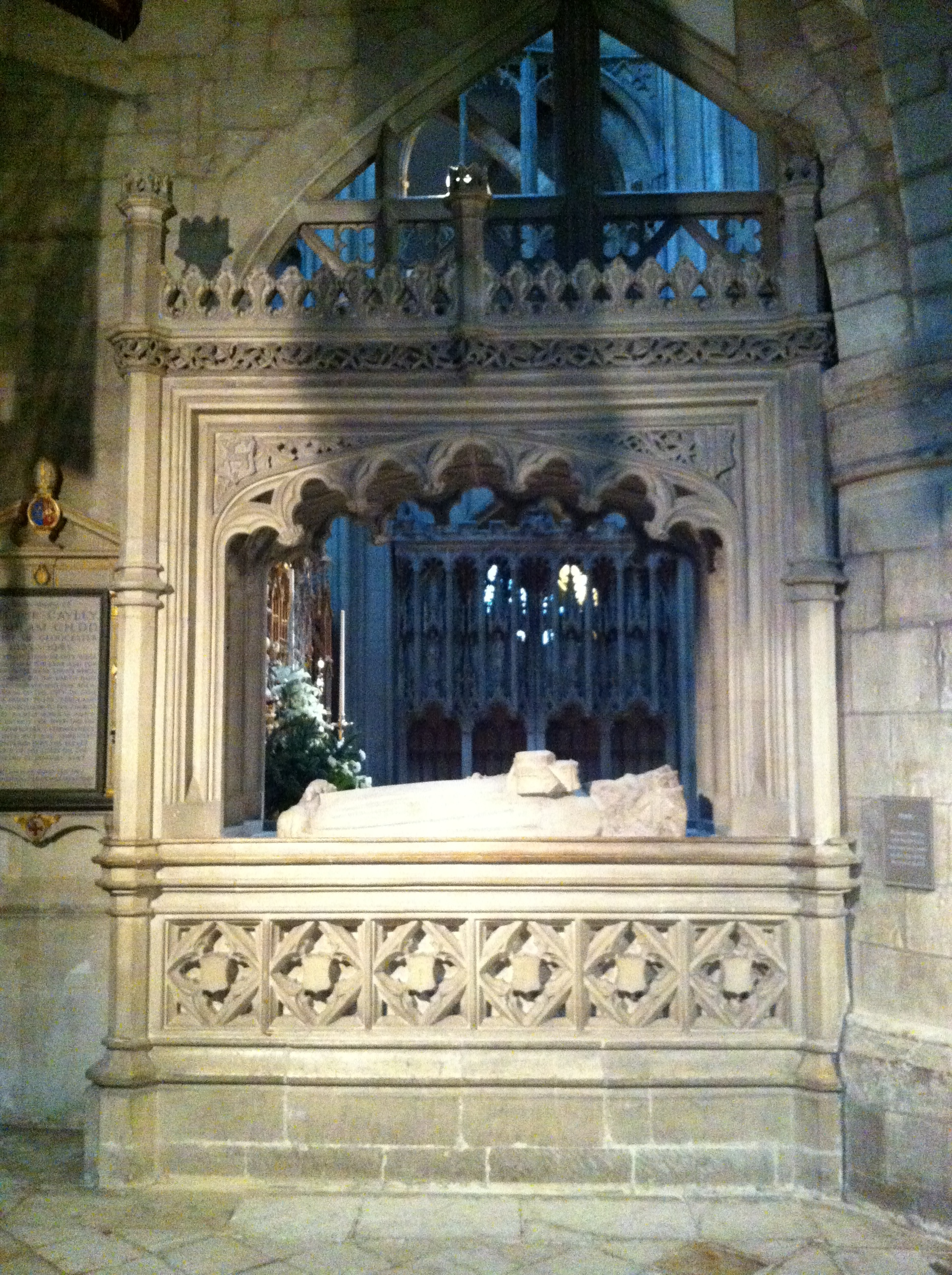
Tomb-like memorial of Osric in Gloucester Cathedral, in Perpendicular Gothic, erected about 1530

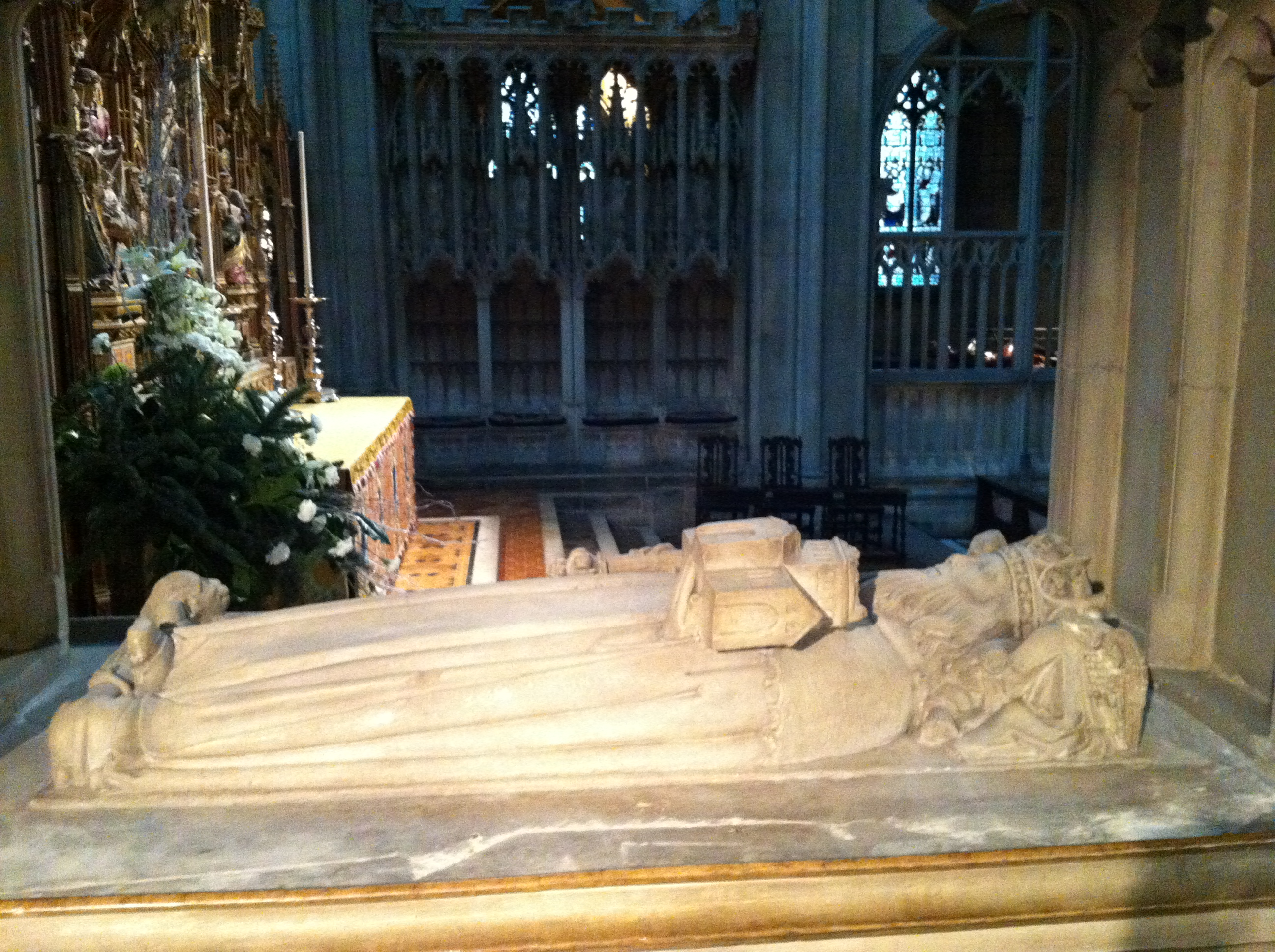
Recumbent effigy

Osric was a king of the Anglo-Saxon kingdom of the Hwicce in the late 7th century, perhaps reigning jointly with his presumed brother Oshere.

Osric was probably a son of Eanhere, a previous King of the Hwicce, by Osthryth, daughter of Oswiu of Northumbria. The only marriage recorded for Osthryth is that to Æthelred of Mercia, but an earlier marriage to Eanhere would explain why Osric and his brother Oswald are described as Æthelred's nepotes — usually translated as nephews or grandsons, but here probably meaning stepsons.

Osric is claimed as the founder of two monastic houses, one at Bath (now Bath Abbey) and the other at Gloucester (now Gloucester Cathedral). In 676 Osric granted lands to Abbess Bertana to found a convent at Bath. The charter attesting this grant has been queried on several grounds of later editing and interpolation, but probably has an authentic basis.

The foundation charter of Gloucester Abbey survives in a medieval register of the abbey. It is not straightforward, but again is considered to have an authentic basis. The charter was apparently issued in the 670s by Æthelred, king of Mercia, and records his grant of lands at Gloucester and Pershore to two of his thegns, noblemen of the Hwicce, Osric and his brother Oswald. Osric's share was at Gloucester, and he sought permission from Æthelred to found a monastery there.

The story of the abbey's foundation continues in the register with the claim that Osric granted the land for the abbey to his sister Kyneburge (Cyneburh), the first abbess. H.P.R. Finberg however speculates that the Cyneburh in question was the widow of Oswald of Northumbria. Oswald was the elder brother of Oswiu and therefore the uncle of Queen Osthryth, who is said to have encouraged her aunt Cyneburh to enter a nunnery many years after Oswald's death. Cyneburgh would therefore be the great-aunt of Osric, rather than his sister.

Though the charter of Gloucester treats Osric as a subordinate of Æthelred, the charter of Bath describes him as king of the Hwicce. He is also so described by Bede.

He may possibly be the Osric who witnessed a doubtful charter of Frithuwold, King of Surrey, dated 675.

Osric was buried at Gloucester Abbey beside Cyneburh, before the altar of St Petronilla; his remains now lie in a medieval tomb in the cathedral.

He seems to have been survived by his brother Oshere, and succeeded by a possible son Æthelmod (mentioned in charter S 1167).

Preceded by Eanhere; Eanfrith	King of Hwicce circa. 670s	Succeeded by Oshere
