= Uhtred of Hwicce =

King of Hwicce

Uhtred

King of Hwicce ?
- Reign: c.750 – c.779 AD
- Died: c.779

Uhtred was the King of Hwicce, jointly with Eanberht and Ealdred.

In 757 Eanberht, Uhtred, and Ealdred, granted land to Bishop Milred, and in 759 to Abbot Headda of Dowdeswell. In 770 Uhtred issued a charter to his thegn Æthelmund. Another grant, to the thegn Ceolmund, is dated 756, apparently in error for 777, 778, or 779.

Preceded by Eanberht	King of Hwicce fl. 750s–779	Succeeded by Ealdred
