= Qurra ibn Sharik al-Absi =

Umayyad governor of Egypt from 709 to 715

Qurra ibn Sharik al-Absi قرة بن شريك العبسي

Governor of Jund Qinnasrin
- Monarch: Abd al-Malik

Governor of Egypt
- In office 709–715
- Monarch: Al-Walid I
- Preceded by: Abdallah ibn Abd al-Malik
- Succeeded by: Abd al-Malik ibn Rifa'a al-Fahmi

Personal details
- Died: 715
- Parent: Sharik ibn Marthad (father)

Qurra ibn Sharīk ibn Marthad al-Absi al-Ghaṭafānī (Arabic: قرة بن شريك العبسي) (fl. 700–715) was a statesman of the Umayyad Caliphate, most notable for his governorship of Egypt under Caliph al-Walid I between 709 and his death in 715.

== Life ==
Information about Qurra's early career is obscure. His father was Sharik ibn Marthad ibn al-Harith ibn Hubaysh of the Bighad branch of the Banu Abs tribe. They were sharīfs (tribal nobles) of the Abs, which was part of the larger Qaysi group resident in northern Syria and Upper Mesopotamia from the early Muslim conquests of the 630s. According to interpretations of Michael the Syrian's chronicle, Qurra served as governor of his native province, Jund Qinnasrin (northern Syria) or possibly Armenia during the last years of Caliph Abd al-Malik (r. 685–705). He later became the katib (secretary or scribe) of Caliph al-Walid I (r. 705–715). His administrative experience, coupled with the tribal origins he shared with the mother of al-Walid I, likely propelled his career during that caliph's rule. His brother Marthad ibn Sharik succeeded him in Qinnasrin.

Al-Walid appointed Qurra governor of Egypt in 709 in place of his own brother Abd Allah, whose corruption was blamed for famine in the province. Qurra's governance was effective, and the chronicler al-Kindi reports that he "reorganized the dīwān" (the army registers, with the names of those entitled to ʿatāʾ, government salary), rebuilt the mosque of Fustat and began irrigation works in the desert. According to Hugh N. Kennedy, "in some ways Qurra is the best-known of all the Umayyad governors of Egypt", since "it is from his period of office that the richest collection of administrative papyri survive". His letters to the pagarch of Aphrodito are especially useful to understand judicial administration in Egypt at that time.

== Death ==
He died in office in 715.

== Sources ==
- Bosworth, C.E. (1986). "Ḳurra b. S̲h̲arīk". In Bosworth, C. E.; van Donzel, E.; Lewis, B. & Pellat, Ch. (eds.). The Encyclopaedia of Islam, Second Edition. Volume V: Khe–Mahi. Leiden: E. J. Brill. pp. 500–501. ISBN 978-90-04-07819-2.
- Caskel, Werner (1966). Ğamharat an-nasab: Das genealogische Werk des His̆ām ibn Muḥammad al-Kalbī, Volume II (in German). Leiden: Brill. OCLC 490272940.
- Crone, Patricia (1980). Slaves on Horses: The Evolution of the Islamic Polity. Cambridge: Cambridge University Press. ISBN 0-521-52940-9.
- Kennedy, Hugh (1998). "Egypt as a province in the Islamic caliphate, 641–868". In Petry, Carl F. (ed.). Cambridge History of Egypt, Volume One: Islamic Egypt, 640–1517. Cambridge: Cambridge University Press. pp. 62–85. ISBN 0-521-47137-0.

Preceded by Abdallah ibn Abd al-Malik	Governor of Egypt; 709–715	Succeeded by Abd al-Malik ibn Rifa'a al-Fahmi
