= Æthelberht, king of the Hwicce =

Anglo-Saxon person

Æthelberht (Old English: Æðelberht) was a possible King of Hwicce jointly with his presumed brothers Æthelheard, Æthelweard, and Æthelric. It is probable that they were all sons of Oshere, although the paternity of Æthelheard and Æthelberht is not explicitly stated in surviving documents.

In 692, together with Æthelheard, Æthelweard, and Æthelric, he witnessed a charter of Æthelred, King of Mercia.

In 693 the four brothers witnessed a charter issued by their father Oshere.

In neither of these charters is he styled king.

== See also ==
- Hwicce
