= Eanhere of Hwicce =

Ruler of Hwicce

Eanhere was a possible ruler of Hwicce, one of the Anglo Saxon kingdoms of England, maybe reigning jointly with his brother Eanfrith. His niece, Eanfrith's daughter Eafe, married King Æðelwealh of Sussex. Unfortunately, the sole source of information concerning Eanhere is Bede, who just mentioned his name in passing, and did not actually state that Eanhere was a king:

"Porro regina, nomine Eabae, in sua, id est Huicciorum prouincia fuerat baptizata. Erat autem filia Eanfridi fratris Ænheri, qui ambo cum suo populo Christiani fuere."

(Moreover, the queen, by the name of Eabae, had been baptized in her own province, that is, the province of the Huicci. She was the daughter of Eanfrid, the brother of Ænher, who, like their people, were both Christians.)

Osric may have been a son of Eanhere, by Osthryth, daughter of Oswiu of Northumbria. The only marriage recorded for Osthryth is that to Æthelred of Mercia, but an earlier marriage to Eanhere would explain why Osric and his brother Oswald are described as Æthelred's nepotes - usually translated as nephews or grandsons, but here probably meaning stepsons.

== Notes ==
Preceded by Title established	King of Hwicce mid-7th century With: Eanfrith	Succeeded by Osric
