= Abd al-Malik ibn Rifa'a al-Fahmi =

Umayyad governor of Egypt (715–717), (727)

Abd al-Malik ibn Rifa'a al-Fahmi عبد الملك بن رفاعة

Governor of Egypt
- In office 715–717
- Monarch: Sulayman
- Preceded by: Qurra ibn Sharik al-Absi
- Succeeded by: Ayyub ibn Sharhabil
- In office 727 – 727 (few weeks)
- Monarch: Hisham
- Preceded by: Hafs ibn al-Walid ibn Yusuf al-Hadrami
- Succeeded by: Al-Walid ibn Rifa'ah al-Fahmi

Sahib al-shurta of Egypt
- In office 709 – 715 (under governor Qurra ibn Sharik al-Absi)
- Monarch: Al-Walid I

Personal details
- Died: 727
- Parent: Rifa'a (father)

Abd al-Malik ibn Rifa'a al-Fahmi (Arabic: عبد الملك بن رفاعة) was the governor of Egypt for the Umayyad Caliphate in 715–717 and 727.

Abd al-Malik was a member of the Arab settler community in Egypt. In 710, he succeeded his uncle at the post of head of security (sahib al-shurta) for the governor Qurra ibn Sharik al-Absi. When Qurra died in office in 715, he was promoted in his stead, the first governor chosen from the local Arabs after several decades where the post had been filled by various grandees of the Umayyad family and their court. His period of office was a continuation of Qurra's, and according to the Coptic sources was marked by increasing fiscal oppression, combined with the efforts of the government to clamp down on avoidance of taxation and corvée labour. This included such measures as restricting their ability to travel through the issue of passports, which greatly impeded trade in the province.

In 727 Abd al-Malik was again made governor of Egypt, but he died of an illness after only a few weeks in office and was succeeded by his brother al-Walid ibn Rifa'a al-Fahmi instead.

== Sources ==
- Ibn Taghribirdi, Jamal al-Din Abu al-Mahasin Yusuf (1929). Nujum al-zahira fi muluk Misr wa'l-Qahira, Volume I (in Arabic). Cairo: Dar al-Kutub al-Misriyya.
- Kennedy, Hugh (1998). "Egypt as a province in the Islamic caliphate, 641–868". In Petry, Carl F. (ed.). Cambridge History of Egypt, Volume One: Islamic Egypt, 640–1517. Cambridge: Cambridge University Press. pp. 62–85. ISBN 0-521-47137-0.
- Al-Kindi, Muhammad ibn Yusuf (1912). Guest, Rhuvon (ed.). The Governors and Judges of Egypt (in Arabic). Leyden and London: E. J. Brill.

| Preceded by Qurra ibn Sharik al-Absi | Governor of Egypt; 715–717 | Succeeded by Ayyub ibn Sharhabil |
| Preceded by Hafs ibn al-Walid ibn Yusuf al-Hadrami | Governor of Egypt; 727 | Succeeded by al-Walid ibn Rifa'a al-Fahmi |
