= Abd al-Rahman ibn Khalid al-Fahmi =

Governor of Egypt for the Umayyad Caliphate from 735 to 736

Abd al-Rahman ibn Khalid al-Fahmi عبد الرحمن بن خالد بن مسافر الفهمي

Umayyad governor of Egypt
- In office 735–736
- Monarch: Hisham
- Preceded by: Al-Walid ibn Rifa'ah al-Fahmi
- Succeeded by: Handhala ibn Safwan al-Kalbi

Chief of police (Sahib al-shurta) of Egypt
- In office 727/728 – 735 (for Al-Walid ibn Rifa'ah)
- Monarch: Hisham

Personal details
- Parent: Khalid ibn Musafir

Abd al-Rahman ibn Khalid ibn Musafir al-Fahmi (Arabic: عبد الرحمن بن خالد بن مسافر الفهمي) was a governor of Egypt for the Umayyad Caliphate from 735 to 736.

A Qays Arab, Abd al-Rahman originally served as chief of police (sahib al-shurta) for al-Walid ibn Rifa'a al-Fahmi before himself succeeding to the governorship upon al-Walid's death in mid-735. He remained in office until a Byzantine sea attack in the following year caused several Muslims to be taken prisoner; as a result, the caliph Hisham ibn Abd al-Malik lost faith in his skill with military matters and replaced him with Handhala ibn Safwan al-Kalbi instead.

== Notes ==
Preceded by Al-Walid ibn Rifa'a ibn Thabit al-Fahmi	Governor of Egypt; 735–737	Succeeded by Handhala ibn Safwan al-Kalbi
