= Eanfrith of Hwicce =

King of Hwicce

Eanfrith

King of Hwicce
- Reign: mid 7th-century
- Successor: Osric
- Died: c. 674
- Issue: Eafe

Eanfrith (died c. 674) was the first recorded king of Hwicce in the 7th century. He was the brother of Eanhere, who may have ruled with him. According to Saint Bēda, he was the father of Eafe, wife of Æthelwealh of Sūthseaxe.

Eanfrith died around 674 and was succeeded by Osric, who was likely a son of Eanhere.

Preceded by	King of Hwicce mid-7th century With: Eanhere	Succeeded by Osric
