= Æthelmund =

Anglo-Saxon noble

- Earldorman

Ealdorman of the Hwicce
- Reign: ca.770 - 802 AD
- Predecessor: Ingeld (Father)
- Successor: Æthelric (Son)
- Died: 802 AD; Battle of Kempsford
- Buried: Deerhurst Abbey, near Tewkesbury
- Spouse: Ceolburh
- Issue: Æthelric
- Father: Ingeld

Æthelmund, an Anglo-Saxon noble, was Ealdorman of Hwicce in the late 8th and early 9th centuries. He was killed in 802 at the Battle of Kempsford by Ealdorman Weohstan and the levies of West Saxon Wiltshire.

Æthelmund's predecessors had been kings, but he was a subject of the King of Mercia. However, in one source, the 14th century Chronicon Vilodunense or Chronicle of Wilton Abbey, he is referred to as "King of the March". Hence he may have also assumed the title of subregulus like his predecessors.

== Family ==
Æthelmund was the son of Ingeld, an Ealdorman from the reign of Æthelbald of Mercia. Æthelmund is believed to have married Ceolburh (d. 807), who is recorded by John of Worcester as an abbess of Berkeley, Gloucestershire. They had at least one son named Æthelric.

== Charter evidence ==
Æthelmund is attested in several Mercian and Hwiccian charters in the late 8th century, all thought to reference the same person.

In 770 Uhtred of Hwicce issued a charter to his thegn Æthelmund . Later, between 793 and 796 Earldorman Æthelmund witnessed a charter of Offa, King of Mercia. In 796 Ecgfrith, King of Mercia and Offa's son, granted land to Æthelmund, now styled princeps .

He seems to have been succeeded as Ealdorman of the Hwicce by his son Æthelric, who issued a charter in 804 , in which he gave land to his mother, Ceolburh, presumably Æthelmund's widow.

== Battle of Kempsford and his death ==
War appears to have been aggravated by the death of the pro-Mercian Beorhtric of Wessex in 802.

According to the ASC, Æthelmund rode south the same day Egbert succeeded to the throne, crossing the river at Cymeresford but was met by Weohstan, Ealdorman of the Wiltshire, with a host numbering in the hundreds. In the following battle, both the leaders were killed but victory rested with the men of Wiltshire. In 1670 a number of spearheads and iron bits were dug up in a field known as "the Battlefield" near Kempsford, which has led to speculation that this was the site of battle.

After his death, Ealdorman Æthelmund was taken to Deerhurst Abbey near Tewkesbury for burial.

== See also ==
- Hwicce
