= Hawthara ibn Suhayl =

Arab administrator and military leader of the Umayyad Egypt

Hawthara ibn Suhayl حوثرة بن سهيل الباهلي

Umayyad governor of Egypt
- In office 745–749
- Monarch: Marwan II
- Preceded by: Hafs ibn al-Walid ibn Yusuf
- Succeeded by: Al-Mughirah ibn Ubaydallah

Personal details
- Died: 750 Wāsiṭ
- Parent: Suhayl

Ḥawthara ibn Suhayl al-Bāhilī (Arabic: حوثرة بن سهيل) (died 750) was a Bedouin Arab administrator and military leader in the final years of the Umayyad Caliphate. The philosopher al-Kindī describes him as famous for his eloquence.

Ḥawthara was appointed wālī (governor) of Egypt in AD 745 (AH 128) by the Caliph Marwān II. He was dispatched with a large army drawn from the jund (army) of bilād al-Shām (Syria). Egypt at that time was under the de facto government of Ḥafṣ ibn al-Walīd, the former governor who had resigned at the accession of Marwān II. His body of non-Arab troops, the Ḥafṣīya, forced him back into power. He refused, however, to oppose Ḥawthara and, after some negotiations, the latter entered Fusṭāt, the capital of Egypt.

Once in power, Ḥawthara purged the leadership of the Ḥafṣīya and executed Ḥafṣ himself. He recruited 2,300 troops from among the Umayyad clients (mawālī) and the Qays tribal confederation. His takeover of Egypt was a violent affair. He had to deal with a Coptic revolt in Bashmur. According to Sāwīrus ibn al-Muqaffaʿ, he launched multiple attacks against the rebels from land and sea but failed to subdue them. In 749, Marwān II came in person with another Syrian army, but his proposed armistice was rejected. In an effort to break the stalemate, Ḥawthara seized the Coptic patriarch, Khaʾil I, held him hostage in Rashīd and threatened to kill him. The gambit failed and the rebels sacked Rashīd. Although he ordered Khaʾil's execution, Ḥawthara called it off at the last minute.

In January 749, Ḥawthara was sent to bolster the forces of Ibn Hubayra during the Abbasid uprising. According to al-Ṭabarī, he brought with him 20,000 Syrian troops, including cavalry, to Fallūja. When Qaḥṭaba ibn Shabīb marched on Kūfa, Ḥawthara advised Ibn Hubayra to head to Khorasan so that Qaḥṭaba would either follow him or be defeated by Marwān at Kūfa. Ibn Hubayra rejected the advice and put Ḥawthara in charge of the vanguard ordering him to try to beat Qaḥṭaba to Kūfa. On 28 August 749, a major battle was fought near Kūfa in which Qaḥṭaba was killed but the Umayyad army was forced to retreat. Ḥawthara retreated as far as the place called Qaṣr ibn Hubayra. From there he planned to march on Kūfa, where the governor, Muḥammad ibn Khalīd al-Qasrī, had joined the rebellion. When his troops began abandoning him, however, he decided to join Ibn Hubayra at Wāsiṭ.

Ḥawthara advised Ibn Hubayra not to remain in Wāsiṭ, but he was ignored. Wāsiṭ was besieged for eleven months, during which time he served as head of the shurṭa. After its surrender, according to al-Ṭabarī, Ḥawthara was executed on the orders of Abū Jaʿfar. According to Sāwīrus ibn al-Muqaffaʿ, however, he was executed in Egypt by Marwān II.

== Bibliography ==
- Crone, Patricia (1980). Slaves on Horses: The Evolution of the Islamic Polity (1980 ed.). Cambridge: Cambridge University Press. ISBN 978-0521229616.
- Kennedy, Hugh (1998). "Egypt as a Province in the Islamic Caliphate, 641–868". In Carl F. Petry (ed.). The Cambridge History of Egypt, Volume 1: Islamic Egypt, 640–1517. Cambridge: Cambridge University Press. pp. 62–85.
- Megally, Mounir (1991). "Bashmuric Revolts". In Aziz Suryal Atiya (ed.). The Coptic Encyclopedia. Vol. 2. New York: Macmillan Publishers. cols. 349b–351b.
- Swanson, Mark N. (2010). The Coptic Papacy in Islamic Egypt (641–1517). Cairo: American University in Cairo Press.
- Williams, John Alden, ed. (1985). The History of al-Ṭabarī, Volume XXVII: The ʿAbbāsid Revolution, A.D. 743–750/A.H. 126–132. SUNY Series in Near Eastern Studies. Albany, New York: State University of New York Press. ISBN 978-0-87395-884-4.

Preceded by Ḥafṣ ibn al-Walīd	Governor of Egypt; 745–749	Succeeded by al-Mughīra ibn ʿUbaydallāh al-Fazārī
