= Heraclius (brother of Tiberius III) =

Brother of the Byzantine emperor Tiberius III (died 705)

- Died: 705
- Relatives: Tiberius III (brother)
- Military career
- Allegiance: Byzantine Empire
- Rank: monostrategos of the Anatolian themes
- Conflicts: Byzantine–Arab Wars; Heraclius' Syrian Campaign; Battle of Sis

Heraclius (Greek: Ἡράκλειος, romanized: Hērákleios) was the brother of the Byzantine emperor Tiberius III (r. 698–705) and the Byzantine Empire's leading general during his reign. He scored a number of victories against the Umayyads, but was unable to halt the Arab conquest of Armenia, nor able to prevent the deposition of his brother by Justinian II (r. 685–695 and 705–711), who later captured and executed both Tiberius and Heraclius.

== Biography ==
Nothing is known of his early life. The name of his brother, Apsimar, probably indicates a Germanic origin. In 698, Apsimar was proclaimed emperor by the Byzantine fleet after a failed expedition to recover Carthage. Apsimar set Constantinople under siege and succeeded in entering the city when some officers opened a gate. Deposing the emperor Leontius (r. 695–698), himself a usurper, Apsimar assumed the throne under the old Roman name Tiberius, and set about to gain legitimacy for his regime by securing a military victory against the Empire's major foe, the Umayyad Caliphate.

Heraclius was appointed by his brother as patrikios and commander-in-chief (monostrategos) of the Anatolian themes. In late autumn, he crossed with his army through the mountain passes of the Taurus Mountains into Cilicia and thence headed to northern Syria. After defeating an Arab army from Antioch, he raided as far as Samosata before returning safely to the Empire in the spring of 699. This success only served to provoke a massive Arab response: over the next few years, the Caliphate's generals Muhammad ibn Marwan and Abdallah ibn Abd al-Malik launched a series of campaigns that conquered what remained of Byzantine Armenia, without Heraclius being able to respond effectively. In 702, however, the Armenians rose up in a large-scale revolt, and asked for Byzantine aid. In 704, while Abdallah, after securing his rear, launched another campaign to recover Armenia, Heraclius attacked the Arabs in Cilicia. He defeated an army of 10,000–12,000 under Yazid ibn Hunain at Sisium, killing most and leading the rest off in chains to Constantinople, but was unable to divert Abdallah from completing his reconquest of Armenia.

At that time, the deposed emperor Justinian II (r. 685–695, 705–711) had escaped from his exile at Cherson and gained the aid of the khans of the Khazars and of the Bulgars. The Empire now faced another threat, as Justinian joined the Bulgar Khan Tervel in autumn 704 and prepared to march into Thrace. Heraclius was recalled from the East and sent to confront Justinian and Tervel, but the allied force bypassed Heraclius's army and seized Constantinople in late summer 705. Tiberius III managed to escape the capital to Sozopolis, where he joined the army of his brother. Their soldiers, however, began deserting them, and Tiberius and Heraclius were captured by Justinian's troops. After being paraded through Constantinople in chains, Heraclius and many of his senior-most officers were then hanged from the city walls, while Leontius and Tiberius were executed at some point between August 705 and February 706.

== Sources ==
- Kazhdan, Alexander, ed. (1991). The Oxford Dictionary of Byzantium. Oxford and New York: Oxford University Press. ISBN 0-19-504652-8.
- Lilie, Ralph-Johannes; Ludwig, Claudia; Pratsch, Thomas; Zielke, Beate (2013). Prosopographie der mittelbyzantinischen Zeit Online. Berlin-Brandenburgische Akademie der Wissenschaften. Nach Vorarbeiten F. Winkelmanns erstellt (in German). Berlin and Boston: De Gruyter.
- Treadgold, Warren (1997). A History of the Byzantine State and Society. Stanford, California: Stanford University Press. ISBN 0-8047-2630-2.
