= Neboulos =

Bulgar general

- Allegiance: Byzantine Empire; Umayyad Caliphate
- Commands: archon of the Slavic corps
- Conflicts: Battle of Sebastopolis

Neboulos (Greek: Νέβουλος) was a South Slavic military commander in the service of the Byzantine Emperor Justinian II (r. 685–695 and 705–711). Around 690, Neboulos was appointed commander a special military corps of about 30,000 men established by the Emperor. In 692/3, he and his corps joined in a major Byzantine campaign against the Umayyad Caliphate. However, in the Battle of Sebastopolis, Neboulos and about 20,000 of his men defected to the Arabs, allegedly bribed by the Arab commander Muhammad ibn Marwan. In retaliation, Justinian II disbanded the corps, executed or enslaved the remaining soldiers and their families. Neboulos and his followers were resettled in Syria to serve in future Arab campaigns.

== Career ==
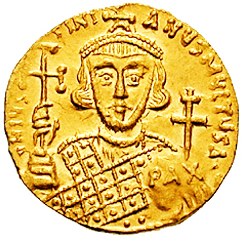
Gold solidus of Justinian II 4.42 grams (0.156 oz), struck during his second reign (705–711)

Early in his reign, Justinian II had the ambition to restore the lands of the former Roman Empire, as Emperor Justinian I did. To accomplish this goal, he aggressively sought combat by undoing measures that brought the peace and prosperity established by his father. Early on, he broke a peace with the Bulgarians and immediately attacked slavic tribes that had established near Thessaloniki. In 688/9, Justinian II forcibly transplanted Slavic populations from the Balkans and settled them in the Opsician Theme, which was depopulated from Arab attacks under Justinian's father reign. He granted them military land grants, and from them, he recruited a special military corps, allegedly 30,000 strong, which was called in "the chosen people" (Greek: λαός περιούσιος), which meant that this population would have a particular function to fulfill under the emperor's direction.

In about 690, Neboulos was placed as the corps' commander (archon). The origin of Neboulos based on his name is disputed between scholars, with some suggesting a Bulgar origin and others a South Slavic one. According to the account of Patriarch Nikephoros, he was chosen from among the nobility of the Slav settlers.

In 692/3, after the corps' training had been completed, they were employed en masse by Justinian II in a major campaign against the Umayyads under the strategos of the Anatolics, Leontios. The Byzantines engaged the Arabs in the Battle of Sebastopolis and initially had the upper hand. However, Neboulos, with the bulk (some 20,000) of his men, deserted the Byzantine lines and went over to the Arabs, allegedly bribed by the Arab commander, Muhammad ibn Marwan. The actions of Neboulos ensured the defeat of the Byzantines.

Sources report how thereafter Justinian II blamed Leontios for the defeat and imprisoned him. He took his revenge on the remaining Slavs. He disbanded the corps, and killed or sold into slavery many of its men, as well as killed the families of the deserters at Leukete near the gulf of Nicomedia. Much of this extermination took place 694/5. Neboulos and his men, on the other hand, were settled by the Umayyads in Syria, and were employed in subsequent Arab forays into Byzantine-held Asia Minor.

Douglas Whalin contends that the story of Neboulos illustrates the challenges the Byzantine Empire faced in depending on foederati (foreign tribe allies bounded by a treaty) when they were not sufficiently Romanized.
