= Abdallah ibn Abd al-Malik =

Umayyad prince, general and governor of Egypt (c.677-c.750)

Abdallah ibn Abd al-Malik عبد الله بن عبد الملك

Governor of Jund Hims
- In office 703–704
- Preceded by: Aban ibn al-Walid ibn Uqba
- Succeeded by: al-Abbas ibn al-Walid

Governor of Egypt
- In office 705–709
- Preceded by: Abd al-Aziz ibn Marwan
- Succeeded by: Qurra ibn Sharik al-Absi

Personal details
- Born: c. 677 or c. 680
- Died: 749/750 al-Hira
- Cause of death: Crucifixion
- Spouse: Ruqayya bint Abd Allah ibn Mu'awiya I
- Children: Muhammad; Marwan; Umar; Sulayman
- Parent: Abd al-Malik ibn Marwan
- Relatives: Al-Walid I (half-brother); Sulayman (half-brother); Umar II (Cousin)

Abdallah ibn Abd al-Malik ibn Marwan (Arabic: عبد الله بن عبد الملك, romanized: Abdallāh ibn ʿAbd al-Malik ibn Marwān; c. 677 – 750) was an Umayyad prince, general, and administrator who served as the governor of Egypt (705–709). A son of Caliph Abd al-Malik ibn Marwan, he was a key military figure in the Arab–Byzantine wars, notably capturing Theodosiopolis and fortifying Mopsuestia.

As part of broader Arabization efforts by the Umayyads, Abdallah changed the language of Egypt's provincial administration from Coptic to Arabic. His tenure was marred by famine and allegations of corruption. Following the Abbasid Revolution, he was executed by the first Abbasid caliph, al-Saffah, in 750.

== Early life and career ==
Abdallah was born c. 677 or c. 680 and grew up in the Caliphate's capital, Damascus. He was a son of Caliph Abd al-Malik and one of the Caliph's umm walads (concubines). During his youth he accompanied his father on several campaigns. He is first mentioned in the sources as leading his own campaign in 700/1, as a retaliation for the attacks of the Byzantine general Heraclius. During this expedition he captured the border fortress of Theodosiopolis and raided into Armenia Minor. In 701 he was sent, along with his uncle, Muhammad ibn Marwan, to Iraq, to aid al-Hajjaj ibn Yusuf in subduing the rebellion of Abd al-Rahman ibn Muhammad ibn al-Ash'ath. In the next year, the Byzantine Armenian provinces east of the Euphrates, recently conquered by Muhammad ibn Marwan, rose in a revolt that spread out over much of Armenia. In 703, Abdallah conquered Mopsuestia (al-Massisa) in Cilicia, which he refortified as the Caliphate's first major stronghold in the area, and then proceeded to subdue the Armenian revolt along with his uncle Muhammad. His father also appointed him as governor of Jund Hims, according to Khalifah ibn Khayyat, although al-Baladhuri claims that this was done by al-Walid I (r. 705–715).

== Governor of Egypt ==
In late 704 he was recalled from Armenia to serve as governor of Egypt, succeeding his long-serving uncle Abd al-Aziz ibn Marwan. Abdallah's tenure was marked by his efforts to assert the caliphal government's control over the province after Abd al-Aziz's twenty-year tenure, which had made the province virtually his personal fief. This was done at the expense of the local elites, whom Abd al-Aziz had been careful to co-opt. Abdallah dismissed his uncle's appointees and required that government business be done in Arabic instead of Coptic. His tenure was marred by the first famine under Islamic rule and by accusations of corruption and embezzlement of public funds. He was recalled in 708/9 and his gains were confiscated by the Caliph. During his tenure, he also came into conflict with many local military leaders, especially the governor of Ifriqiya, Musa ibn Nusayr.

== Later life and death ==
Nothing is known of him thereafter, except for a report by al-Ya'qubi that he was executed by crucifixion by the first Abbasid caliph, al-Saffah, at al-Hira in 749/50, after the Umayyad dynasty was toppled during the Abbasid Revolution.

== Family and descendants ==
Abdallah was married to Ruqayya bint Abd Allah, a granddaughter of Caliph Mu'awiya I (r. 661–680). In 720, following the suppression of the anti-Umayyad revolt of Yazid ibn al-Muhallab in Iraq, Abdallah's son Muhammad obtained a pardon for one of the revolt's key participants from Abdallah's brother, the governor of Iraq Maslama ibn Abd al-Malik, whose daughter was married to Muhammad. Muhammad's daughter Zaynab was married to the son of Caliph Hisham (r. 724–743), Mu'awiya, with whom she had a son, Hisham. Another son of Abdallah, Marwan, was the governor of Jund Hims under Caliph al-Walid II (r. 743–744). Abdallah's son Umar was the leader of the Hajj pilgrimage of Mecca in 744 under Caliph Yazid III (r. 744–744). A great-great-grandson of Abdallah, Muhammad ibn Abd al-Salam ibn Isma'il ibn Sulayman, is recorded as one of the Umayyad nobles living in the Umayyad state of Córdoba (Spain), which was established in 756.

== Sources ==
- Becker, C. H. (1960). "ʿAbd Allāh b. ʿAbd al-Malik". In Gibb, H. A. R.; Kramers, J. H.; Lévi-Provençal, E.; Schacht, J.; Lewis, B. & Pellat, Ch. (eds.). The Encyclopaedia of Islam, Second Edition. Volume I: A–B. Leiden: E. J. Brill. p. 42. OCLC 495469456.
- Biesterfeldt, Hinrich; Günther, Sebastian (2018). The Works of Ibn Wāḍiḥ al-Yaʿqūbī (Volume 3): An English Translation. Leiden: Brill. ISBN 978-90-04-35621-4.
- Borrut, Antoine (2013). "ʿAbdallāh b. ʿAbd al-Malik b. Marwān". In Fleet, Kate; Krämer, Gudrun; Matringe, Denis; Nawas, John; Rowson, Everett (eds.). Encyclopaedia of Islam (3rd ed.). Brill Online. doi:10.1163/1573-3912_ei3_COM_24680. ISSN 1873-9830.
- Crone, Patricia (1980). Slaves on Horses: The Evolution of the Islamic Polity (1980 ed.). Cambridge: Cambridge University Press. ISBN 978-0521229616.
- Powers, David S., ed. (1989). The History of al-Ṭabarī, Volume XXIV: The Empire in Transition: The Caliphates of Sulaymān, ʿUmar, and Yazīd, A.D. 715–724/A.H. 96–105. SUNY Series in Near Eastern Studies. Albany, New York: State University of New York Press. ISBN 978-0-7914-0072-2.
- Hinds, Martin, ed. (1990). The History of al-Ṭabarī, Volume XXIII: The Zenith of the Marwānid House: The Last Years of ʿAbd al-Malik and the Caliphate of al-Walīd, A.D. 700–715/A.H. 81–95. SUNY Series in Near Eastern Studies. Albany, New York: State University of New York Press. ISBN 978-0-88706-721-1.
- Kennedy, Hugh (1998). "Egypt as a province in the Islamic caliphate, 641–868". In Petry, Carl F. (ed.). Cambridge History of Egypt, Volume One: Islamic Egypt, 640–1517. Cambridge: Cambridge University Press. pp. 62–85. ISBN 0-521-47137-0.
- Treadgold, Warren (1997). A History of the Byzantine State and Society. Stanford, California: Stanford University Press. ISBN 0-8047-2630-2..
- Lilie, Ralph-Johannes; Ludwig, Claudia; Pratsch, Thomas; Zielke, Beate (1999). Prosopographie der mittelbyzantinischen Zeit: 1. Abteilung (641–867), Band 1: Aaron (# 1) – Georgios (# 2182) (in German). Berlin and Boston: De Gruyter. p. 5. ISBN 978-3-11-015179-4.
- Robinson, Majied (2020). Marriage in the Tribe of Muhammad: A Statistical Study of Early Arabic Genealogical Literature. Berlin: Walter de Gruyter. ISBN 9783110624168.
- Scales, Peter C. (1994). The Fall of the Caliphate of Córdoba: Berbers and Andalusis in Conflict. Leiden: Brill.
- Uzquiza Bartolomé, Aránzazu (1994). "Otros Linajes Omeyas en al-Andalus" [Other Umayyad Lineages in al-Andalus]. In Marín, Manuela (ed.). Estudios onomástico-biográficos de Al-Andalus: VI [Onomastic-biographies of al-Andalus: VI] (in Spanish). Madrid: Consejo Superior de Investigaciones Científicas. pp. 445–462. ISBN 84-00-07415-7.

Preceded by Abd al-Aziz ibn Marwan	Governor of Egypt; 705–709	Succeeded by Qurra ibn Sharik al-Absi
