= Æthelric of Hwicce =

King of the Hwicce

Æthelric was a king of the Hwicce and son of Oshere; it is possible that he reigned jointly with Æthelheard, Æthelweard, and Æthelberht.

He is known from charters.

In 692 he witnessed a charter of Æthelred, King of Mercia S 75, together with Æthelheard, Æthelweard, and Æthelberht, and in 693 the four brothers witnessed a charter issued by their father Oshere S 53

In 706 (S 1174), he granted land with consent of Cenred, King of Mercia; then in 736 (S 89), as Æthilric subregulus, he witnessed a charter of Æthelbald, King of Mercia; and in an undated charter (S 94), he received a grant himself from the same king.

His kinsman thegn Osred received a grant in 743 from king Æthelbald in charter S 99.

== Notes ==
Preceded by Æthelweard	King of Hwicce fl. 736	Succeeded by Eanberht
