= Æthelweard of Hwicce =

King of Hwicce

Æðelweard was the king of Hwicce. He apparently reigned jointly with his presumed brothers Æthelheard, Æthelberht and Æthelric. He was the son of Oshere.

He is known from charters:

In 692, together with Æthelheard, issued a charter to Abbess Cuthswith, and also witnessed a charter of Æthelred, king of Mercia, together with Æthelheard, Æthelberht, and Æthelric. In 693 the four brothers witnessed a charter issued by their father Oshere.

In 706 he granted land to Bishop Ecgwine. In this charter Æthelweard is styled subregulus, Osheri quondam regis Wicciorum filius.

Possibly he is also the Æþeluuard dux who in 716 or 717 witnessed a charter issued by Æthelbald, King of Mercia.

== See also ==
- Hwicce

Preceded by Æthelheard	King of Hwicce fl. 709	Succeeded by Æthelric
