= Battle of Sebastopolis =

692 CE Battle between the Umayyad Caliphate and the Byzantine empire

- Part of the Arab–Byzantine wars
Date	692 CE
Location	Sebastopolis in Pontus, Armeniac Theme
Result	Umayyad victory

Belligerents
Umayyad Caliphate	Byzantine Empire

Commanders and leaders
Muhammad ibn Marwan	Leontius; Neboulos

The Battle of Sebastopolis was fought at Sebastopolis (Note: It is mostly identified with Elaiussa Sebaste in Cilicia but also with modern Sulusaray.) in the middle of the Armeniac Theme in 692 CE between the Byzantine Empire and the Umayyad Caliphate. With this battle, the long-standing peace between the two powers, established in 680, came to an end.

Justinian II sought to restore the territorial extent of the Roman Empire under Justinian I by pursuing military campaigns that reversed the policies of his father, Constantine IV. Early on, he broke a treaty with the Bulgarians and attacked Slavic tribes near Thessaloniki, resettling many in the Opsician Theme and enrolling them in a new corps under Neboulos. Later, tensions with the Umayyads increased after Justinian II undermined an existing treaty and prepared for war. However, the long preparation by the Byzantines gave sufficient time for the Umayyads to assemble an army and invade Byzantine territories.

The Byzantine army, led by Leontios, met the forces of Muhammad ibn Marwan near Sebastopolis in the Armeniac Theme. The Umayyads used texts of the broken treaty as their flag to display the justice of their cause. The Byzantines initially had the advantage in the battle, however, Neboulos and a significant portion of the Slavic troops defected to the Umayyad side, presumably bribed by Muhammad ibn Marwan. The desertion caused a Byzantine defeat. Following this, Justinian punished the remaining Slavic troops harshly, while the Umayyads resumed raids into Byzantine territory.

== Background ==
Byzantine Empire at different periods. The lands of the Byzantine Empire were greatly reduced in 690 AD compared with their size under Justinian I in 550 AD.

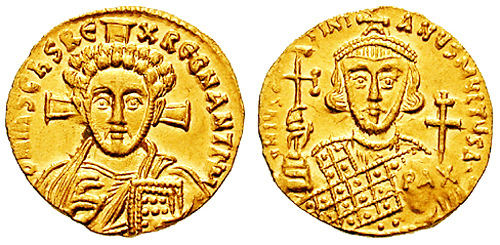
Gold solidus of Justinian II 4.42 grams (0.156 oz), struck after 692

Early in his reign, Justinian II had the ambition to restore the lands of the former Roman Empire, as Emperor Justinian I had during his reign. To accomplish this goal, he sought combat by undoing measures established by his father. Early on, he broke peace with the Bulgarians and immediately attacked Slavic tribes that had established themselves near Thessaloniki. In 688/9, Justinian II transplanted Slavic populations from the Balkans and settled them in the Opsician Theme, which had been depopulated from Arab attacks under the father of Justinian's reign. He granted them military land grants, and from them he recruited a special military corps, allegedly 30,000 strong, called "the chosen people" (Greek: λαὸς περιούσιος), which meant that this population would have a particular function to fulfill under the emperor's direction, presumably to participate in military campaigns. In about 690, Neboulos was placed as the corps' commander (archon).

Justinian II was bound by a treaty with the Umayyad Caliphate that granted him tribute in gold coins. However, he devised a way to undermine it. He introduced new coins featuring his portrait on one side and Christ's on the other. The leader of the caliphate, Abd al-Malik ibn Marwan, made similar coins but omitted Christ's image, making them slightly lighter. Justinian then refused the tribute, claiming that the coins were not equivalent. When Abd al-Malik offered to increase the amount to meet the agreed value, Justinian II declared the treaty broken and began preparations for war.

== Battle ==
By the summer of 692, (Note: Scholars provide alternative years, 691 and 693.) after the corps' training had been completed, they were employed en masse by Justinian II in a major campaign against the Umayyads under the strategos of the Anatolics, Leontios.

The long preparation by Justinian II gave the caliphate sufficient time to raise its own army and invade Byzantium before Justinian's army invaded the caliphate's territories. The Byzantines engaged the Arabs near Sebastopolis, in the middle of the Armeniac Theme. The Umayyads, incensed at the breaking of the treaty, used copies of its texts in the place of a flag to emphasize the justice of their cause. In the battle, the Byzantines initially had the upper hand. However, Neboulos, with the bulk (some 20,000 (Note: Scholars have expressed the belief that this figure is overstated.)) of his men, deserted the Byzantine lines and went over to the Arabs, allegedly bribed by the Arab commander, Muhammad ibn Marwan. The actions of Neboulos ensured the defeat of the Byzantines.

== Aftermath ==
Justinian II's defeat deprived him of a viable army to continue his military campaigns, and the rupture of the treaty with the caliphate enabled the Arabs to launch new raids against Byzantine territories.

Sources report that after the battle, Justinian II blamed Leontios for the defeat and imprisoned him. Irritated by the defeat acted on the remaining Slavs, he disbanded the entire corps and killed or sold into slavery many of its men, as well as killed the families of the deserters at Leukete near the Gulf of Nicomedia. Much of this extermination took place in 694/695; some scholars dispute this account. Neboulos and his men, on the other hand, were settled by the Umayyads in Syria, and were employed in subsequent Arab forays into Byzantine-held Asia Minor. Historian Douglas Whalin contends that the story of Neboulos illustrates the challenges the Byzantine Empire faced in depending on foederati (foreign tribe allies bounded by a treaty) when they were not sufficiently Romanized.
