= Æthelheard of Hwicce =

Ruler of Hwicce

Æthelheard was the king of Hwicce, he reigned jointly with his presumed brothers Æthelweard, Æthelberht and Æthelric. It is probable that they were all sons of Oshere, although the paternity of Æthelheard and Æthelberht is not explicitly stated in surviving documents.

In 692, together with Æthelweard, he issued a charter to Abbess Cuthswith, and also witnessed a charter of Æthelred, King of Mercia, together with Æthelweard, Æthelberht, and Æthelric. In 693 the four brothers witnessed a charter issued by their father Oshere.

The only time that he is styled rex appears to be in the possibly genuine witness list attached to a spurious charter attributed to Cenred, King of Mercia in 709.

Preceded by Oshere	King of Hwicce fl. 709	Succeeded by Æthelweard
