= Oshere of Hwicce =

Ruler of Hwicce

Oshere (fl. 690s) was king of the Hwicce, an Anglo-Saxon tribe occupying land in what later became Gloucestershire and Worcestershire. A member of the royal house of Northumbria, Oshere was a sub-king to Æthelred, king of Mercia (d. c 709).

== Family ==
From meagre sources, historians have tried to piece together the relationships between Oshere and other Hwiccian contemporaries—Osric, king of Hwicce (d. 729), and Oswald, founder of Pershore Abbey (689).

There are various theories regarding the relationships among these figures. One is that Oshere was a brother of both Osric and Oswald; another, put forward by Bishop William Stubbs, was that Oshere was the son of Oswald, who was brother to Osric. Royal Historical Society president William Hunt favored the first theory and added that, if true, it would mean that Oshere was a nephew of Queen Osthryth, wife of King Æthelred of Mercia.

Historians have felt on firmer ground identifying two sisters of Oshere: Ecgburg, second abbess of Gloucester, and Wethburg, a nun. Details of the family appear in a letter Ecgburg wrote to Bishop Wynfrith (Boniface) c. 716, lamenting the death of her brother and the long absence of her sister. Her sister, she had heard, was "Romana carcer inclusit," which historian Diane Watt translates as "in a Roman cell as a recluse" nun. He subsequently communicated with Wethburg, who responded by pointing out the dangers of traveling to Rome due to frequent Saracen attacks. In addition to Ecgburg and Wethburg, a third sister is also possible. To be specific, William Hunt identified Kyneburga, first abbess of Gloucester, as the sister of Ecgburg and, therefore, of King Oshere.

The sons of Oshere have been identified as Æthelheard, Æthelward and Æthelric.

== Education ==
Little is known of Oshere's education, but since his sister was educated, it follows that he would have been as well. Ecgburg's letter to Boniface reveals a cultivated intellect, leading Diane Watt to state that she was among the "highly educated women" who corresponded with the bishop. The historian Patrick Sims-Williams noted her familiarity with the works of classical Greece and Rome and even went so far as to compare her "highly poetic style" to those of Jerome and Paulinus of Nola.

Ecgburg indeed identifies Boniface as her teacher, and, in mentioning "the affection which assuredly bound you to my brother," she suggests that Oshere also studied under Boniface. Most instructive regarding Oshere's education is Ecgburg's statement that she was "inferior" to her brother "in knowledge and in merit."

== Charters ==
Charters granted in Oshere's name prior to 693 are said to be spurious. Among those is a charter of 680 granting 30 hides for a monastery at Ripple in Worcestershire, which did, however, refer to Oshere as king of the Hwicce acting under Æthelred's authority.

In 693, Oshere, along with his son Æthelheard, granted land to Cuthswith, abbess of Bath who may have been a member of the Mercian royal family or the Hwiccian dynasty. Specifically, the abbess was given 15 hides at Penintanham (believed to be Inkberrow in Worcestershire) and at Dyllawidu (location unknown) for the foundation of a monastery, which must have prospered since she later added 5 hides at Ingin(n) (probably Ingon) twelve miles from Penintanham.

Between 674 and 704, Oshere also granted 21 hides at Withington (now in Gloucestershire) to Abbess Dunna for the founding of a monastery.

== Death ==
Ecgburg's letter to Boniface, dated c. 716, laments the death of Oshere. Ecgburg referred to Oshere's death as "cruel and bitter," leading one historian to speculate that he may have fallen in battle.

== Notes ==
Preceded by Osric	King of Hwicce circa. 690s	Succeeded by Æthelheard
