= List of caliphal governors of Medina =

Map showing Medina (al-Madinah) in western Arabia in the eighth century

In early Islamic history, the governor of Medina (Arabic: عامل المدينة, romanized: ʿāmil al-Madīnah) was an official who administered the city of Medina and its surrounding territories.

During the era of the Rashidun, Umayyad and early Abbasid caliphates, the governor was generally appointed by the caliph, and remained in office until he died or was dismissed. The governorship was one of the chief administrative positions in the Hijaz and carried with it certain symbolic privileges, including the opportunity to lead the annual Muslim pilgrimage.

== Rashidun governors ==
Known in pre-Islamic times as Yathrib, Medina (Arabic: المدينة, meaning simply "The City") became the residence of the Islamic prophet Muhammad following his Hijrah from Mecca in 622 AD. Under Muhammad and the first three Rashidun caliphs, Medina acted as the capital of a rapidly increasing Muslim Empire, but its remoteness from the emerging power centers of Syria and Iraq eventually undermined its political importance. Following the assassination of the third caliph Uthman ibn Affan in July 656 and the outbreak of the First Fitna or civil war, his successor Ali ibn Abi Talib was compelled to depart from Medina in order to assert his authority in Iraq, and the city lost its status as the capital of the Islamic state.

With the departure of Ali from Medina, administration of the city was delegated to a number of representatives appointed by him. These representatives remained in control of Medina until 660, when an army dispatched by the Umayyad Mu'awiya ibn Abi Sufyan arrived at the city and forced Ali's governor to flee to Iraq.

Name	Years	Nature of Termination	Notes
Sahl ibn Hunayf	From 657	Dismissed	Governor for Ali
Tammam ibn Abbas		Dismissed	Governor for Ali
Abu Ayyub al-Ansari	To 660	Fled	Governor for Ali

== Umayyad governors ==
Following the ascendency of the Umayyads in 661, Medina's loss of its political significance became permanent. The Umayyad caliphs, who were firmly based in the region of Syria, had few incentives to relocate to the Hijaz, and they generally made their residence in the area of Damascus. Although Medina continued to retain its religious importance as one of the Holy Cities of Islam, it became something of a political backwater under the Umayyads and its old elites, the Ansar, were reduced to acting as a "pious opposition" to the new regime.

As the Umayyads had no interest in returning the capital to Medina, they instead dispatched governors to administer the city on their behalf. Governors were normally selected by the caliph and remained in office until they died or were dismissed in favor of a replacement candidate. In addition to Medina itself, they were sometimes (though not always) given jurisdiction over Mecca and al-Ta'if, and were often selected by the caliphs to act as leader of the annual pilgrimage to Mecca. In an effort to ensure that Umayyad interests were fully represented in the city, the caliphs usually selected blood or marital relatives for the position, but a few governors, such as with the Ansari Abu Bakr ibn Muhammad ibn Amr ibn Hazm, were exceptions to this rule.

Governors assigned to Medina during this period played no role in the Muslim conquests due to the lack of active military fronts near the Hijaz, but they were occasionally forced to deal with internal challenges to Umayyad rule. During the Second Fitna the Medinese threw off their allegiance to Yazid ibn Mu'awiya (r. 680–683) and expelled all of the Umayyads then in the city; this attempt to regain their old power, however, came to an end with their defeat at the Battle of al-Harrah in August 683, and the city was pillaged by the victorious Syrian troops in retaliation for its disobedience. Shortly afterwards Medina came under the nominal control of the anti-caliph Abdallah ibn al-Zubayr (r. 683–692), but the Umayyads took back the city near the end of the Fitna and their hold on it was thereafter generally secure until the last years of their rule.

Umayyad control of Medina came to an end during the period of the Third Fitna; the city was lost temporarily to Ibadi rebels in 747, and was then lost permanently with the overthrow of the dynasty by the Abbasid Revolution in 750.

Umayyad governors
Name	Years	Nature of Termination	Notes
Marwan ibn al-Hakam	662–669	Dismissed	Subsequently became caliph in 684. Appointed by the caliph Mu'awiya ibn Abi Sufyan
Sa'id ibn al-As	669–674	Dismissed	Cousin of Mu'awiya, who appointed him
Marwan ibn al-Hakam	674–677/8	Dismissed	Re-appointed by Mu'awiya
Al-Walid ibn Utba ibn Abi Sufyan	677/8–680	Dismissed	Nephew of Mu'awiya, who appointed him
Amr ibn Sa'id ibn al-As	680–681	Dismissed	Son of Sa'id ibn al-As. Appointed by the caliph Yazid ibn Mu'awiya
Al-Walid ibn Utba ibn Abi Sufyan	681–682	Dismissed	Re-appointed, this time by Yazid ibn Mu'awiya
Uthman ibn Muhammad ibn Abi Sufyan	682–683	Expelled	Cousin of Yazid ibn Mu'awiya, who appointed him
None	683	n/a	Revolt of the Ansar, Qurayshis and non-Qurayshi Muhajirun in Medina

Zubayrid interregnum
Name	Years	Nature of Termination	Notes
Ubayda ibn al-Zubayr	684-685	Dismissed	Brother of Abdallah ibn al-Zubayr, who appointed him. Jabir ibn al-Aswad ibn Awf and Abbas ibn Sahl ibn Sa'd al-Ansari are also mentioned as governors during this period
Mus'ab ibn al-Zubayr	685-686	Moved to Iraq	Brother of Ibn al-Zubayr, who appointed him
Jabir ibn al-Aswad ibn Awf	687-690	Dismissed	(Re-)Appointed by Ibn al-Zubayr
Talha ibn Abdallah ibn Awf	690-691	Fled	Appointed by Ibn al-Zubayr

Umayyad governors (restored)
Name	Years	Nature of Termination	Notes
Tariq ibn Amr	691/2-693	Dismissed	Re-established Umayyad control over Medina; confirmed as governor by the caliph Abd al-Malik ibn Marwan
al-Hajjaj ibn Yusuf	693-694	Dismissed	Appointed by Abd al-Malik ibn Marwan
Yahya ibn al-Hakam ibn Abi al-As	694-695	Resigned	Uncle of Abd al-Malik ibn Marwan, who appointed him
Aban ibn Uthman	695-702	Dismissed	Son of Uthman ibn Affan. Appointed by Abd al-Malik ibn Marwan
Hisham ibn Isma'il al-Makhzumi	702-706	Dismissed	Father-in-law of Abd al-Malik ibn Marwan, who appointed him
Umar ibn Abd al-Aziz	706-712	Dismissed	Subsequently became caliph in 717. Appointed by the caliph al-Walid ibn Abd al-Malik
Uthman ibn Hayyan al-Murri	712-715	Dismissed	Appointed by al-Walid ibn Abd al-Malik
Abu Bakr ibn Muhammad ibn Amr ibn Hazm	715-720	Dismissed	Appointed by the caliph Sulayman ibn Abd al-Malik
Abd al-Rahman ibn al-Dahhak ibn Qays al-Fihri	720-723	Dismissed	Appointed by the caliph Yazid ibn Abd al-Malik
Abd al-Wahid ibn Abdallah al-Nasri	723-724	Dismissed	Appointed by Yazid ibn Abd al-Malik
Ibrahim ibn Hisham ibn Isma'il al-Makhzumi	724-732	Dismissed	Son of Hisham ibn Isma'il. Appointed by the caliph Hisham ibn Abd al-Malik
Khalid ibn Abd al-Malik ibn al-Harith ibn al-Hakam	732-736/7	Dismissed	Appointed by Hisham ibn Abd al-Malik
Muhammad ibn Hisham ibn Isma'il al-Makhzumi	736/7-743	Dismissed	Brother of Ibrahim ibn Hisham. Appointed by Hisham ibn Abd al-Malik
Yusuf ibn Muhammad ibn Yusuf al-Thaqafi	743-744	Dismissed	Appointed by the caliph al-Walid ibn Yazid
Abd al-Aziz ibn Abdallah ibn Amr ibn Uthman	744	Dismissed	Great-grandson of Uthman ibn Affan. Appointed by the caliph Yazid ibn al-Walid
Abd al-Aziz ibn Umar ibn Abd al-Aziz	744-747	Dismissed	Appointed by Yazid ibn al-Walid
Abd al-Wahid ibn Sulayman ibn Abd al-Malik	747	Fled	Appointed by the caliph Marwan ibn Muhammad
None	747-748	n/a	Ibadi occupation of Medina
Muhammad ibn Abd al-Malik ibn Marwan	748		
Al-Walid ibn Urwah al-Sa'di	748-750	Dismissed	Appointed by his uncle Abd al-Malik ibn Muhammad ibn Atiyyah
Yusuf ibn Urwah al-Sa'di	750		Last governor for the Umayyads. Appointed by Marwan ibn Muhammad

== Abbasid governors ==
The administrative situation of Medina was initially little changed by the coming of the Abbasids, who were generally centered in the region of Iraq. Governors of Medina continued to be appointed by the caliph and were selected to lead several of the annual pilgrimages. Like their predecessors, the Abbasid caliphs frequently chose members of their own dynasty for the governorship, but they also often appointed individuals from other families who were related to the Abbasids in some capacity.

In the first decades of Abbasid rule Medina was occasionally the scene of Alid rebel movements, but these were generally minor affairs and were easily put down by the government. The short-lived revolt of Muhammad al-Nafs al-Zakiyya in 762, which was briskly defeated despite having had strong support from among the Medinese elite, particularly served as a demonstration as to how far the city had declined in terms of actual political influence, and Muhammad's choice to base the rebellion in Medina was specifically criticized by Muslim historians for prioritizing the city's religious significance over any sound strategic considerations. A later revolt by Muhammad's nephew al-Husayn ibn Ali al-Abid was also brief and ended in failure at the Battle of Fakhkh near Mecca in 786, while the seizure of Medina by a lieutenant of the pro-Alid rebel Abu al-Saraya al-Sari ibn Mansur in 815 during the Fourth Fitna was likewise temporary and the city was soon restored to Abbasid control.

Two major sources for the identities of governors of Medina, the annalists Muhammad ibn Jarir al-Tabari and Khalifah ibn Khayyat, give regular updates down to the mid-780s, but provide only sporadic information after that time. The cessation of coverage, as well as available numismatic evidence, indicate that Medina may have been declining in importance during this period, and that it was gradually being superseded by Mecca as the primary administrative center of the Hijaz. In the ninth and tenth centuries the Hijaz was also affected by a general economic downturn and Medina began to be threatened by brigand raids, of which at least one was serious enough to prompt the central government to send an expedition to restore order.

With the collapse of the Abbasids' political power in the early tenth century, the Ikhshidid ruler of Egypt Muhammad ibn Tughj al-Ikhshid was granted jurisdiction over Mecca and Medina by the caliph al-Radi in 935. Later that century, the descendants of Husayn ibn Ali gained local control of Medina, and they thereafter ruled the Emirate of Medina under Egyptian suzerainty down nearly to the Ottoman conquest in 1517.

Name	Years	Nature of Termination	Notes
Dawud ibn Ali	750	Died in office	Uncle of the caliph al-Saffah, who appointed him
Ziyad ibn Ubaydallah ibn Abdallah ibn Abd al-Madan al-Harithi	750-758	Dismissed	Uncle of al-Saffah, who appointed him
Muhammad ibn Khalid ibn Abd Allah al-Qasri	758-760/1	Dismissed	Appointed by the caliph al-Mansur
Riyah ibn Uthman al-Murri	760/1-762	Imprisoned	Son of Uthman ibn Hayyan. Appointed by al-Mansur
None	762	n/a	Alid occupation of Medina
Kathir ibn al-Husayn al-Abdi	762-763	Dismissed	Appointed by Isa ibn Musa
Abdallah ibn al-Rabi al-Harithi	763	Dismissed	Appointed by al-Mansur
Ja'far ibn Sulayman ibn Ali	763-766/7	Dismissed	First cousin of al-Mansur, who appointed him
al-Hasan ibn Zayd ibn al-Hasan ibn Ali ibn Abi Talib	766/7-772	Dismissed	Appointed by al-Mansur
Abd al-Samad ibn Ali	772-776	Dismissed	Uncle of al-Mansur, who appointed him
Muhammad ibn Abdallah al-Kathiri	776	Dismissed	Appointed by the caliph al-Mahdi
Ubaydallah ibn Muhammad ibn Abd al-Rahman ibn Safwan al-Jumahi	776-777	Died in office	Appointed by al-Mahdi
Muhammad ibn Abdallah al-Kathiri	777	Dismissed	Re-appointed by al-Mahdi
Zufar ibn Asim al-Hilali	777-780	Dismissed	Appointed by al-Mahdi
Ja'far ibn Sulayman ibn Ali	780-783	Dismissed	Re-appointed, this time by al-Mahdi
Ibrahim ibn Yahya ibn Muhammad	783-784	Died in office	First cousin of al-Mahdi, who appointed him
Ishaq ibn Isa ibn Ali	784-785	Resigned	First cousin once removed of al-Mahdi, who appointed him
Umar ibn Abd al-Aziz ibn Abdallah ibn Abdallah ibn Umar ibn al-Khattab	785-786	Dismissed	Appointed by the caliph al-Hadi
Ishaq ibn Sulayman ibn Ali	From 786		First cousin twice removed of the caliph Harun al-Rashid, who appointed him
Abd al-Malik ibn Salih ibn Ali			First cousin twice removed of Harun al-Rashid, who appointed him
Muhammad ibn Abdallah al-Raba'i	From 789		Appointed by Harun al-Rashid
Musa ibn Isa ibn Musa			Second cousin of Harun al-Rashid, who appointed him
Ibrahim ibn Muhammad ibn Ibrahim			Appointed by Harun al-Rashid
Ali ibn Isa ibn Musa			Second cousin of Harun al-Rashid, who appointed him
Muhammad ibn Ibrahim			Appointed by Harun al-Rashid
Abdallah ibn Mus'ab al-Zubayri	796/7		Appointed by Harun al-Rashid
Bakkar ibn Abdallah al-Zubayri	797	808/9	Appointed by Harun al-Rashid
Abu al-Bakhtari Wahb ibn Wahb	808-809		Appointed by Harun al-Rashid
Isma'il ibn al-Abbas ibn Muhammad	810		Appointed by the caliph al-Amin
Dawud ibn Isa ibn Musa al-Hashimi	811-815	Fled	Second cousin once removed of al-Amin, who appointed him. Later switched his allegiance to the rival caliph al-Ma'mun
None	815	n/a	Occupation of Medina on behalf of the pro-Alid rebel Abu al-Saraya al-Sari ibn Mansur
Harun ibn al-Musayyab	From 815		Dispatched by the general Ali b. Abi Sa'id
Ubaydallah ibn al-Abbas ibn Ubaydallah ibn al-Abbas			Appointed by al-Ma'mun
Ubaydallah ibn al-Hasan ibn Ubaydallah ibn al-Abbas ibn Ali ibn Abi Talib	From 820		Appointed by al-Ma'mun
Quthm ibn Ja'far ibn Sulayman ibn Ali ibn Abdallah ibn al-Abbas	From 823	Dismissed	Appointed by al-Ma'mun
Muhammad ibn Fulan ibn al-Husayn ibn Zayd		Dismissed	Appointed by al-Ma'mun
Sulayman ibn Abdallah ibn Sulayman ibn Ali	From 828		Appointed by al-Ma'mun
Muhammad ibn Salih ibn al-Abbas	From 843		Appointed by the caliph al-Wathiq
Salih ibn Ali ibn Isa	To 861		
Ali ibn al-Husayn ibn Isma'il	From 861		
Ishaq ibn Muhammad ibn Yusuf al-Ja'fari	To 879	Died in office	
Musa ibn Muhammad ibn Yusuf al-Ja'fari	879	Killed	Brother of Ishaq ibn Muhammad
Ahmad ibn Muhammad ibn Isma'il ibn al-Hasan ibn Zayd	879	Dismissed	Initially a Zaydi rebel; subsequently legitimized by the central government
Muhammad ibn Abi al-Saj	From 879	Dismissed	
Al-Fadl ibn al-Abbas al-Abbasi	fl. 883		
Ahmad ibn Muhammad al-Ta'i	From 885		
Harun ibn Muhammad ibn Ishaq al-Hashimi	fl. 890		

== See also ==
- List of Umayyad governors of al-Andalus
- List of caliphal governors of Arminiyah
- List of caliphal governors of Egypt
- List of caliphal governors of Ifriqiyah
- List of Umayyad governors of Iraq
- List of caliphal governors of Sind
