= Hazem =

Hazem (also spelled Hazm or Hazim, Arabic: حازم) is both a given name and a surname of Arabic origin. Notable people with the name include:

== Given name ==
- Hazem El Beblawi (born 1936), Egyptian economist and politician
- Hazim Delić (born 1964), Bosniak Deputy Commander of the Čelebići prison camp
- Hazem Emam (born 1975), Egyptian footballer
- Hazem Harb (born 1980) Palestinian visual artist
- Hazem Harba (born 1970), Syrian footballer
- Hazem al-Sharaa (born 1975), Syrian lawyer
- Hazem Salah Abu Ismail (born 1961), Egyptian lawyer and politician
- Hazem Mahamid (born 1987), Syrian footballer
- Hazem El Masri (born 1976), Lebanese rugby league player
- Hazem Nuseibeh (1922–2022), Jordanian politician
- Hazim al-Shaalan (born 1947), Iraqi politician
- Hazim Al-Sha'arawi, Palestinian deputy director of Al-Aqsa Television

== Surname ==
- Abu Bakr ibn Muhammad ibn Hazm (died 737), Islamic scholar
- Farid Hazem (born 1986), French footballer
- Ibn Hazm (994–1064), Andalusian philosopher

== Locations ==
- Ottoman name for Hazm, Suwayda

== See also ==
- Hazem (UAV)
