= Abd al-Wahid ibn Abdallah al-Nasri =

Umayyad governor from 723 to 724

Abd al-Wahid ibn Abdallah (Arabic: عبد الواحد بن عبد الله), known as al-Nasri or al-Nadri, was an eighth-century governor of Medina, Mecca and al-Ta'if from 723 to 724.

== Career ==
Abd al-Wahid held various posts during the reign of the Umayyad caliph Yazid ibn Abd al-Malik, initially serving as the governor of Homs at an unspecified date and then of al-Ta'if in 721/2. In 723 he was additionally appointed as governor of Medina and Mecca, and in that same year he was selected to act as the leader of the pilgrimage.

Upon his appointment to Medina, Abd al-Washid carried out the caliph's instructions to fine and torture the previous governor Abd al-Rahman ibn al-Dahhak ibn Qays al-Fihri for his conduct against Fatimah bint al-Husayn. In contrast to his predecessor he made sure to maintain good relations with the city elites and regularly consulted with the local notables al-Qasim ibn Muhammad ibn Abi Bakr and Salim ibn Abdallah ibn Uthman, with the result that his administration soon became extremely popular among the Medinese. His initial choice to lead the judiciary of Medina was Sa'd ibn Ibrahim ibn Abd al-Rahman al-Zuhri, but he eventually dismissed him and replaced him with Sa'id ibn Sulayman ibn Zayd al-Ansari instead.

Following the death of Yazid in January 724 Abd al-Wahid was initially confirmed in his governorships by Hisham ibn Abd al-Malik, but responsibility for the pilgrimage of that year was given to the new caliph's uncle Ibrahim ibn Hisham ibn Isma'il al-Makhzumi. In November of that year Hisham decided to appoint Ibrahim as governor of Medina, Mecca and al-Ta'if as well, and Abd al-Wahid was dismissed from office after a term of less than two years.

== Notes ==
Preceded by Abd al-Rahman ibn al-Dahhak ibn Qays al-Fihri	Governor of Medina; 723–724	Succeeded by Ibrahim ibn Hisham ibn Isma'il al-Makhzumi
Preceded by Abd al-Rahman ibn al-Dahhak ibn Qays al-Fihri	Governor of Mecca; 723–724	Succeeded by Ibrahim ibn Hisham ibn Isma'il al-Makhzumi
