= Muhammad ibn Khalid =

Muhammad ibn Khalid (Arabic: محمد بن خالد) can refer to:

- Muhammad ibn Khalid al-Qasri, Abbasid governor in the mid-8th century
- Muhammad ibn Khalid ibn Barmak, one of the Barmakids, Abbasid courtier under Harun al-Rashid
- Muhammad ibn Khalid al-Shaybani, Abbasid general and governor in Transcaucasia in the mid-9th century
