= Ibrahim ibn Hisham ibn Isma'il al-Makhzumi =

Umayyad governor of Medina, Mecca and al-Ta'if during the caliphate of Hisham

Ibrahim ibn Hisham ibn Isma'il al-Makhzumi (Arabic: إبراهيم بن هشام بن إسماعيل المخزومي) was an eighth century official for the Umayyad Caliphate, serving as the governor of Medina, Mecca and al-Ta'if during the caliphate of Hisham ibn Abd al-Malik. He and his brother Muhammad ibn Hisham ibn Isma'il al-Makhzumi were later tortured to death in 743 in the period leading up to the Third Islamic Civil War.

== Career ==
The sons of Hisham ibn Isma'il al-Makhzumi, Ibrahim and Muhammad were maternal uncles of the caliph Hisham ibn Abd al-Malik (r. 724–743), who relied on them to act as his governors of the Hijaz for the majority of his reign. Although the sources frequently confuse the two brothers, Ibrahim appears to have been appointed as governor of Medina, Mecca and al-Ta'if in 724 and to have been dismissed in 732, and was also the caliph's choice to lead the pilgrimages of 724, 726–731 and possibly 732. During his governorship his appointees to lead the Medinese judiciary were Muhammad ibn Safwan al-Jumahi and al-Salt ibn Zubayd al-Kindi.

In the last years of Hisham's reign Ibrahim and Muhammad were supporters of the caliph's unsuccessful plan to replace the heir-apparent al-Walid ibn Yazid with his own son Maslamah, but with the death of Hisham in 743 their political influence came to an end. Upon his accession to the caliphate al-Walid handed over the two brothers to his new governor of Medina, Yusuf ibn Muhammad ibn Yusuf al-Thaqafi, who paraded them in front of the city inhabitants and had them flogged; shortly afterwards al-Walid ordered Yusuf to transfer Ibrahim and Muhammad to Yusuf ibn Umar al-Thaqafi in Iraq, where together with Khalid ibn Abdallah al-Qasri they were tortured to death. The brutal treatment of Ibrahim and Muhammad exacerbated hostility against al-Walid, playing a role in the caliph's own downfall and death and the outbreak of civil war in the following year.

== Notes ==
Preceded by Abd al-Wahid ibn Abdallah al-Nasri	Governor of Medina; 724–732	Succeeded by Khalid ibn Abd al-Malik ibn al-Harith ibn al-Hakam
Preceded by Abd al-Wahid ibn Abdallah al-Nasri	Governor of Mecca; 724–731/2	Succeeded by Muhammad ibn Hisham ibn Isma'il al-Makhzumi
