= Makhzumi =

Makhzumi may refer to:

- Makhzumi dynasty
- Hisham ibn Isma'il al-Makhzumi
- Abu Salama 'Abd Allah ibn 'Abd al-Asad al-Makhzumi
