= Uthman ibn Hayyan al-Murri =

Governor of Medina
- In office 712–715
- Monarch: al-Walid I
- Preceded by: Umar ibn Abd al-Aziz
- Succeeded by: Abu Bakr ibn Muhammad ibn Amr ibn Hazm

Personal details
- Relations: Banu Murra (tribe)
- Children: Riyah ibn Uthman al-Murri
- Parent: Hayyan al-Murri

Uthman ibn Hayyan al-Murri (Arabic: عثمان بن حيان المري) was an 8th-century provincial governor and military commander for the Umayyad Caliphate. He served as the governor of Medina from 712 or 713 to 715.

== Career ==
A member of the Banu Murra, Uthman was appointed over Medina during the reign of al-Walid ibn Abd al-Malik (r. 705–715) after being recommended to the caliph by al-Hajjaj ibn Yusuf, the powerful governor of Iraq. During his administration Uthman took harsh measures to crack down on anti-Umayyad elements in the city and punished a number of individuals who were suspected of engaging in sedition. He particularly took action against a large group of Iraqi emigres whose presence in Medina had caused the city to develop a reputation as a center of political dissent, forcibly deporting them back to al-Hajjaj in neck collars and threatening to demolish the homes of any Medinese who were caught providing shelter to them. At the urging of several Medinese citizens he also issued a directive to expel singers and adulterers from the city in an effort to clamp down on corruption, but following the intercession of a local notable he changed his mind and rescinded the order.

Uthman's term as governor lasted until 715, when he became a target of the new caliph Sulayman ibn Abd al-Malik's campaign to remove his predecessor's political appointees from power. In June of that year Sulayman dismissed Uthman in favor of the chief qadi of Medina, Abu Bakr ibn Muhammad ibn Amr ibn Hazm, and additionally sent instructions to have him flogged. This act made Uthman deeply resentful of Abu Bakr, and after Yazid ibn Abd al-Malik became caliph in 720 he petitioned that an investigation into the circumstances surrounding his flogging be opened, which led to Abu Bakr himself receiving the hadd punishment from the new governor of Medina Abd al-Rahman ibn al-Dahhak. The feud between Uthman and Abu Bakr continued at least until 721/2, when Abd al-Rahman was ordered to effect a reconciliation between the two men.

Uthman later served as a military commander on the Byzantine frontier, and was a leader of the 722 and 723 summer expeditions against the Byzantines. His son, Riyah ibn Uthman al-Murri, served as the governor of Madina during the time of al-Mansur.

== Notes ==
Preceded by Umar ibn Abd al-Aziz	Governor of Medina; 712/3–715	Succeeded by Abu Bakr ibn Muhammad ibn Amr ibn Hazm
