= Abd al-Rahman ibn al-Dahhak ibn Qays al-Fihri =

Abd al-Rahman ibn al-Dahhak ibn Qays al-Fihri (Arabic: عبد الرحمن بن الضحاك بن قيس الفهري) was an eighth-century governor of Medina (720–723) and Mecca (721/2–723) for the Umayyad Caliphate.

== Career ==
Abd al-Rahman was the son of al-Dahhak ibn Qays al-Fihri, a Qurayshite leader of the Qays tribes who was killed at the Battle of Marj Rahit in 684. He himself was appointed governor of Medina at the beginning of the caliphate of Yazid ibn Abd al-Malik (r. 720–724), and was additionally given jurisdiction over Mecca in 721 or 722. He was also selected by Yazid to lead the pilgrimages of 720, 721 and 722.

As governor, Abd al-Rahman was unpopular with Medina's notables due to his refusal to consult with the city's prominent citizens, and he was accused of treating its old elites, the Ansar, in a contemptuous manner. He had a particularly tense relationship with his immediate predecessor, the Ansari Abu Bakr ibn Muhammad ibn Amr ibn Hazm, and eventually had Abu Bakr flogged after receiving instructions from the caliph to open an investigation into the ex-governor's treatment of Uthman ibn Hayyan al-Murri. He also dismissed Abu Bakr's qadi Abu Tuwalah Abdallah ibn Abd al-Rahman al-Ansari from office, replacing him with Salamah ibn Abdallah al-Makhzumi instead.

Abd al-Rahman's governorship came to a sudden end in 723 as a result of his pursuit of Fatimah bint al-Husayn, the granddaughter of Ali ibn Abi Talib, when he attempted to force her into marriage by threatening to whip her eldest son if she refused. Fatimah countered by filing a complaint with Yazid ibn Abd al-Malik, who angrily responded by dismissing him from his posts, levying a fine of forty thousand dinars against him, and ordering for him to be tortured such that the caliph could "hear him screaming" from his residence in Syria. Upon learning of the pronouncement against him, Abd al-Rahman attempted to place himself under the protection of the caliph's brother Maslamah ibn Abd al-Malik, but Yazid refused to give him a reprieve and he was eventually sent back to Medina for the punishment to be carried out. As a result of his sentence he became destitute and was later reported to be seen begging on the streets of Medina.

== Notes ==
Preceded by Abu Bakr ibn Muhammad ibn Amr ibn Hazm	Governor of Medina; 720–723	Succeeded by Abd al-Wahid ibn Abdallah al-Nasri
Preceded by Abd al-Aziz ibn Abdallah ibn Khalid ibn Asid	Governor of Mecca; 721/2–723	Succeeded by Abd al-Wahid ibn Abdallah al-Nasri
