= Dawud ibn Ali al-Hashimi =

Abbasid governor of Medina and Mecca (750)

Dāwūd ibn ʿAlī داود بن علي

Abbasid governor of Kufa
- In office 749–750
- Monarch: al-Saffah
- Succeeded by: Isa ibn Musa

Abbasid governor of Medina and Mecca
- In office 750–750
- Monarch: al-Saffah
- Preceded by: Yusuf ibn Urwah al-Sa'di (Umayyad governor)
- Succeeded by: Ziyad ibn Ubayd Allah al-Harithi

Personal details
- Died: c. 750 Medina, Abbasid Caliphate
- Parent: Ali ibn Abdallah (father)

Military service
- Years of service: 749 – 750
- Battles/wars: Abbasid Revolution

Dawud ibn Ali al-Hashimi (Arabic: داود بن علي الهاشمي, romanized: Dāwūd ibn ʿAlī al-Hāshimi) was an eighth century Abbasid personage. He first served as the first governor of Kufa, and later as the first governor of Medina and Mecca in 750 for the Abbasid Caliphate.

== Life ==
Dawud was the son of Ali ibn Abd Allah ibn al-Abbas. He was a paternal uncle of the first two Abbasid caliphs al-Saffah (r. 750–754) and al-Mansur (r. 754–775), making him one of the "uncles" ('umumah) that held a high degree of influence during the early years following the Abbasid revolution, while initially serving as governor of Kufa from late 749 until being succeeded by Isa ibn Musa.

In 750, al-Saffah appointed him governor of Medina and Mecca. Upon arriving in Mecca, he immediately demolished a water pool built by the former Umayyad governor Khalid ibn Abdallah al-Qasri. Following the pilgrimage season, Dawud targeted members of the Umayyad clan belonging to the line of Sa'id ibn al-As, executing several in Mecca, sending others in chains to Ta'if for execution, and imprisoning a group who subsequently died in his custody. (Note: Those executed included: Abd Allah ibn Anbasa and Ismail ibn Umayya, while others, including Ayyub ibn Musa, died in his custody.) He then replicated these measures after moving to Medina. Dawud died in office later in 750 after serving for only two months in Medina, and was succeeded by Ziyad ibn Ubayd Allah al-Harithi.

== Bibliography ==
- Crone, Patricia (1980). Slaves on Horses: The Evolution of the Islamic Polity (1980 ed.). Cambridge: Cambridge University Press. ISBN 978-0521229616.
- Williams, John Alden, ed. (1985). The History of al-Ṭabarī, Volume XXVII: The ʿAbbāsid Revolution, A.D. 743–750/A.H. 126–132. SUNY Series in Near Eastern Studies. Albany, New York: State University of New York Press. ISBN 978-0-87395-884-4.
- Kennedy, Hugh (1981). The Early Abbasid Caliphate, A Political History. Routledge. ISBN 978-0-389-20018-5.
- Elad, Amikam (2015). The Rebellion of Muḥammad al-Nafs al-Zakiyya in 145/762: Ṭālibīs and Early ʿAbbāsīs in Conflict. BRILL. ISBN 978-90-04-29622-0.
- Gordon, Matthew S.; Robinson, Chase F.; Rowson, Everett K.; Fishbein, Michael, eds. (2018). The Works of Ibn Wāḍiḥ al-Yaʿqūbī: An English Translation. Vol. 3. Brill. ISBN 978-90-04-36416-5.
