= Aban ibn Uthman =

Son of Uthman and Great Islamic Scholar

Aban ibn Uthman أبان بن عثمان

Umayyad governor of the Hejaz
- In office 695–702
- Monarch: Abd al-Malik ibn Marwan
- Preceded by: Yahya ibn al-Hakam
- Succeeded by: Hisham ibn Isma'il al-Makhzumi

Personal details
- Born: 641 Medina, Hejaz, Rashidun Caliphate
- Died: c. 723 (aged 82–83) Medina, Hejaz, Umayyad Caliphate
- Spouses: Umm Sa'id bint Abd al-Rahman ibn al-Harith ibn Hisham; Umm Kulthum bint Abd Allah ibn Ja'far ibn Abi Talib
- Children: Sa'id; Abd al-Rahman; Umar al-Akbar; Umm Sa'id al-Kubra; Umar al-Asghar; Marwan; Umm Sa'id al-Sughra
- Parents: Uthman (father); Umm Amr bint Jundab ibn Amr al-Dawsiyya (mother)

Religious life
- Religion: Islam
- Profession: Hadith scholar, mufassir, jurist (Tabi'i)

Abu Sa'id Aban ibn Uthman ibn Affan al-Umawi (Arabic: أَبُو سَعِيد أَبَان بْنُ عُثْمَانُ بْنُ عَفَّان الأُمَوِيّ, romanized: Abū Saʿīd Abān ibn ʿUthmān ibn ʿAffān al-Umawī; died 105 AH/723 CE) was an early Muslim historian and traditionalist. He also served a seven-year stint as governor of Medina in 695–702, during the reign of the Umayyad caliph Abd al-Malik (r. 685–705).

== Biography ==
Aban was a son of Uthman (r. 644–656), the third Rashidun caliph. His mother was Umm Amr bint Jundab ibn Amr al-Dawsiyya of the Azd tribe of Yemen. During the First Fitna, which occurred in the wake of his father's assassination, Aban fought alongside the forces of Aisha and his Umayyad kinsmen against the fourth Rashidun caliph Ali (r. 656–661) at the Battle of the Camel in November 656. As Aisha's supporters were on the verge of defeat, Aban fled the battle. Later, the Umayyad caliph Abd al-Malik (r. 685–705) appointed Aban governor of Medina in 695 and he continued in the post until being replaced by Hisham ibn Isma'il al-Makhzumi in 702. During his term, he led the funeral prayers, as was customary of the governor, for Muhammad ibn al-Hanafiyya, a son of Ali and an important figure of the Alid family.

He became incapacitated in 722/23 and died in Medina the following year, in 723/24, during the reign of Caliph Yazid II. Aban does not appear to have been a major political operative of the Umayyads and owes most of his fame for his knowledge of Islamic tradition. He is credited by a number of scholars for authoring the maghazi (biography) of Muhammad, though the historians Yaqut al-Hamawi and Ahmad al-Tusi credit this work to a certain Aban ibn Uthman ibn Yahya.

== Descendants ==
Aban had at least two wives. His first, Umm Sa'id bint Abd al-Rahman, a granddaughter of al-Harith ibn Hisham, belonged to the Banu Makhzum clan. She mothered two of Aban's sons, his eldest Sa'id and Abd al-Rahman, and a daughter. His second wife, Umm Kulthum bint Abd Allah was a granddaughter of Ja'far ibn Abi Talib. Aban's son Marwan was married to Umm Qasim, the daughter of al-Hasan ibn al-Hasan and great-granddaughter of Ja'far's brother, Caliph Ali.

The names of the descendants of Aban have been recorded in the historical record up to at least 1375 in Egypt, where some of his descendants moved. Others are recorded in the sources in al-Andalus, including his grandson Uthman ibn Marwan and the latter's great-grandson Muhammad ibn Abd al-Rahman.

== Bibliography ==
- Ahmed, Asad Q. (2011). The Religious Elite of the Early Islamic Ḥijāz: Five Prosopographical Case Studies. Occasional Publications UPR. ISBN 978-1-900934-13-8.
- Landau-Tasseron, Ella, ed. (1998). The History of al-Ṭabarī, Volume XXXIX: Biographies of the Prophet's Companions and their Successors: al-Ṭabarī's Supplement to his History. SUNY Series in Near Eastern Studies. Albany, New York: State University of New York Press. ISBN 978-0-7914-2819-1.
- Uzquiza Bartolomé, Aránzazu (1994). "Otros Linajes Omeyas en al-Andalus". In Marín, Manuela (ed.). Estudios onomástico-biográficos de Al-Andalus: V (in Spanish). Madrid: Consejo Superior de Investigaciones Científicas. pp. 445–462. ISBN 84-00-07415-7.
- Zetterstéen, K. V. (1960). "Abān ibn ʿUthmān ibn ʿAffān". In Gibb, H. A. R.; Kramers, J. H.; Lévi-Provençal, E.; Schacht, J.; Lewis, B. & Pellat, Ch. (eds.). The Encyclopaedia of Islam, Second Edition. Volume I: A–B. Leiden: E. J. Brill. pp. 2–3. OCLC 495469456.

Preceded by Yahya ibn al-Hakam	Governor of Medina; 695–701/02	Succeeded by Hisham ibn Isma'il al-Makhzumi
