= Ziyad ibn Ubayd Allah al-Harithi =

Abbasid governor of Medina and Mecca (750–758)

Ziyad ibn Ubayd Allah زياد بن عبيد الله al-Harithi

Abbasid governor of Medina and Mecca
- In office 750–758
- Monarchs: al-Saffah, al-Mansur
- Preceded by: Dawud ibn Ali
- Succeeded by: Muhammad ibn Khalid

Personal details
- Died: c. 760s Abbasid Caliphate
- Relations: Rayta bint Ubayd Allah (sister)
- Parent: Ubayd Allah ibn Abd Allah al-Harithi (father)

Ziyad ibn Ubayd Allah al-Harithi (Arabic: زياد بن عبيد الله الحارثي) (full name Ziyad ibn Ubayd Allah ibn Abd Allah ibn Abd al-Madan al-Harithi) was an eighth century Abbasid governor of Medina and Mecca from 750 to 758 for the Abbasid Caliphate. He was the second Abbasid Caliphal governor of Medina and Mecca.

== Life ==
Ziyad was the son of Ubayd Allah ibn Abd Allah ibn Abd al-Madan al-Harithi. His sister, Rayta bint Ubayd Allah was married to Muhammad ibn Ali al-Hashimi who was the father of the first Abbasid caliph al-Saffah.

Al-Saffah appointed his paternal uncle, Dawud ibn Ali al-Hashimi as the first governor of Medina and Mecca in 750, however he died in office that same year. Al-Saffah then appointed Ziyad ibn Ubayd Allah, his maternal uncle as governor in 750. He remained in the office throughout the reign of his nephew al-Saffah.

He was dismissed by al-Mansur (brother and successor of al-Saffah) in 758. Muhammad ibn Khalid ibn Abd Allah al-Qasri was appointed by the caliph al-Mansur.

== Sources ==
- Crone, Patricia (1980). Slaves on Horses: The Evolution of the Islamic Polity. Cambridge: Cambridge University Press. ISBN 0-521-52940-9.
- Khalifah ibn Khayyat (1985). al-Umari, Akram Diya' (ed.). Tarikh Khalifah ibn Khayyat (in Arabic) (3rd ed.). Al-Riyadh: Dar Taybah.
- Yarshater, Ehsan, ed. (1985–2007). The History of al-Ṭabarī (40 vols). SUNY Series in Near Eastern Studies. Albany, New York: State University of New York Press. ISBN 978-0-7914-7249-1.
