= Hazm, Suwayda =

Hazm حزم Hazem
- Village
- Location within Syria
- Coordinates: 33°05′59″N 36°31′10″E
- PAL: 292/279
- Country: Syria
- Governorate: Suwayda
- District: Shahba
- Subdistrict: Sawra as-Saghira

Population (2004 census)
  - Total: 858
- Time zone: UTC+2 (EET)
  - Summer (DST): UTC+3 (EEST)

Hazm (Arabic: حزم) is a village situated in the Shahba District of Suwayda Governorate, in southern Syria. According to the Syria Central Bureau of Statistics (CBS), Hazm had a population of 858 in the 2004 census. Its inhabitants are predominantly Druze.

== History ==
In 1596, it appeared in Ottoman tax registers under the name of Hazim, located in the nahiya of Bani Miglad in the Qada Hawran. It had an entirely Muslim population consisting of 10 households and 4 bachelors. The villagers paid a fixed tax rate of 40% on various agricultural products, including wheat (3700 a.), barley (1800 a.), summer crops (300 a.), goats and/or beehives (150 a.), in addition to "occasional revenues"; a total of 6,000 akçe.

== Religious buildings ==
- Maqam al-Khidr (Druze Shrine)

== See also ==
- Druze in Syria

== Bibliography ==
- Hütteroth, W.-D.; Abdulfattah, K. (1977). Historical Geography of Palestine, Transjordan and Southern Syria in the Late 16th Century. Erlanger Geographische Arbeiten, Sonderband 5. Erlangen, Germany: Vorstand der Fränkischen Geographischen Gesellschaft. ISBN 3-920405-41-2.
