= Umar ibn Abd al-Aziz =

Umayyad caliph from 717 to 720

Umar ibn Abd al-Aziz عمر بن عبد العزيز
- Amir al-Mu'minin; Khalifat Allah
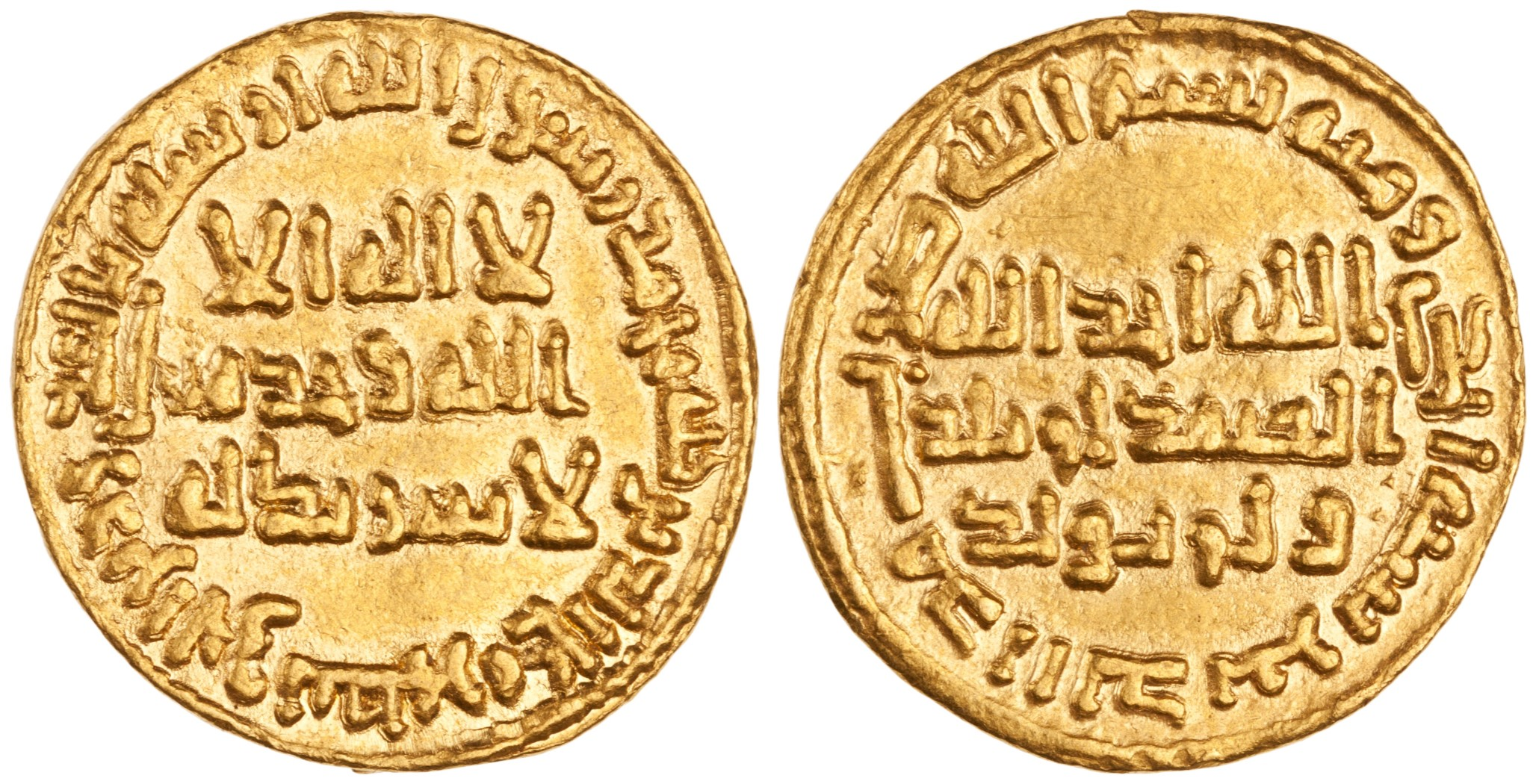
- Gold dinar of Umar, c. 719

8th Caliph of the Umayyad Caliphate
- Reign: 22 September 717 – 4 February 720 (2 years, 137 days)
- Predecessor: Sulayman ibn Abd al-Malik
- Successor: Yazid II

Umayyad governor of the Hejaz
- In office: 706–712
- Predecessor: Hisham ibn Isma'il al-Makhzumi
- Successor: Uthman ibn Hayyan (in Medina); Khalid ibn Abdallah (in Mecca)
- Born: c. 680; Medina, Hejaz, Umayyad Caliphate
- Died: c. 5 February 720 (aged 40); Dayr Sim'an, Syria, Umayyad Caliphate
- Wife: Fatima bint Abd al-Malik; Umm Shu'ayb bint Shu'ayb ibn Zabban; Lamis bint Ali
- Issue: Abd Allah; Abd al-Aziz; Abd al-Malik; Al-Walid; Asim; Abd al-Rahman; Sulayman; Maslama; Zayd; Ubayd Allah; Uthman
- House: Marwanid
- Dynasty: Umayyad
- Father: Abd al-Aziz ibn Marwan
- Mother: Layla bint Asim
- Religion: Islam

Umar ibn Abd al-Aziz ibn Marwan (Note: Arabic: عُمَر بْن عَبْد الْعَزِيز بْن مَرْوَان, romanized: ʿUmar ibn ʿAbd al-ʿAzīz ibn Marwān) (c. 680 – February 720), commonly known as Umar II, was the eighth Umayyad caliph, ruling from 717 until his death in 720. He succeeded his cousin, Sulayman ibn Abd al-Malik.

Umar's brief administration instituted major fiscal changes, notably tax reforms that exempted non-Arab Muslims (mawali) from the jizya to address financial inequality, alongside measures preventing the dynastic privatization of state lands. In addition to these economic policies, his government directed the early official compilation of hadith literature. Burdened by the severe financial strain and heavy casualties of the Siege of Constantinople, Umar ordered the withdrawal of Muslim forces from exposed northern fronts, including Constantinople and Cilicia, to consolidate defenses around the Syrian heartland. Despite a general de-escalation of large-scale offensive campaigns, his administration oversaw the conquest and fortification of Narbonne in Septimania.

Contemporaries widely viewed Umar as the Mahdi, due to his reputation for piety, generosity, asceticism, and a profound sense of justice. Many Muslims regard him as the fifth rightly guided caliph. Standing apart from other Umayyad rulers in historical memory, both early critics and the Abbasids largely spared his memory from the systematic desecration and exhumation applied to the rest of the dynasty.

== Early life ==
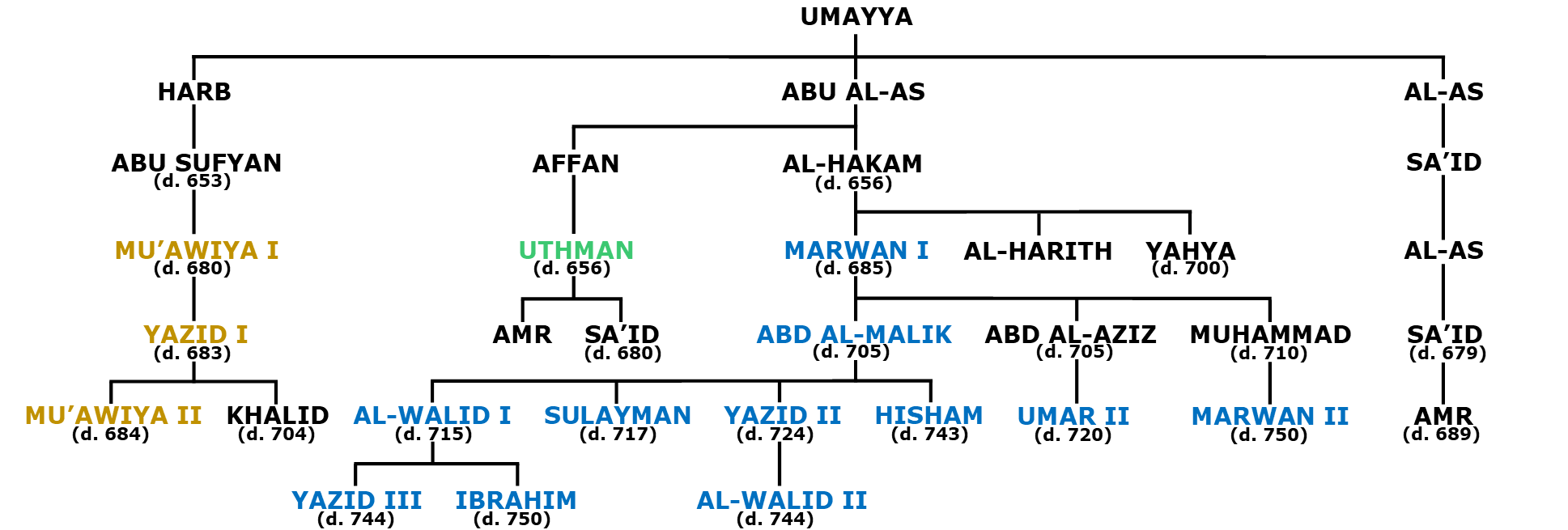
Family tree of the Umayyad dynasty. Umar's grandfather Marwan I and the caliphs descended from him are highlighted in blue, while the Sufyanid caliphs are highlighted in yellow.

Umar was likely born in Medina around 680. His father, Abd al-Aziz ibn Marwan, belonged to the ruling family of the Umayyad Caliphate based in the city, while his mother, Layla bint Asim, hailed from the Banu Adi clan of the Quraysh and was a granddaughter of the second Rashidun caliph Umar (r. 634–644). Like his maternal great-grandfather, he bore the kunya (teknonym) Abū Ḥafṣ. Historians would later emphasize his descent from Umar I to differentiate his character and rule from other Umayyad caliphs.

At the time of Umar's birth, another branch of the Umayyads, the Sufyanids, ruled from their capital Damascus. After Caliph Yazid I (r. 680–683) and his son and successor, Mu'awiya II (r. 683–684), died in quick succession in 683 and 684, Umayyad authority collapsed across the Caliphate. Abd Allah ibn al-Zubayr (r. 683–692), who had refused allegiance to Yazid and gathered support in the Hejaz, declared himself caliph in Mecca following Yazid's death. His supporters expelled the Umayyads from the Hejaz, including Medina. The Umayyad exiles took refuge in Syria, where loyalist Arab tribes supported the dynasty. With the support of these tribes, Umar's grandfather Marwan I (r. 684–685) became caliph and reasserted Umayyad rule in Syria.

In 685, Marwan ousted Ibn al-Zubayr's governor from Egypt and appointed Umar's father to the province. Umar spent part of his childhood in Egypt, particularly in Hulwan, which had become the seat of his father's governorship between 686 and his death in 705. He received his education in Medina, which his uncle, Caliph Abd al-Malik (r. 685–705), retook in 692. Having spent much of his youth in Medina, Umar developed ties with the city's pious men and transmitters of hadiths. (Note: Hadith refers to the recorded traditions, sayings, actions, and approvals attributed to the Islamic prophet Muhammad, which serve as a primary source of Islamic law and guidance.) Following the death of Umar's father, Abd al-Malik recalled Umar to Damascus.

== Governorship of the Hejaz ==
Shortly after his accession, Abd al-Malik's son and successor, al-Walid I (r. 705–715), appointed Umar governor of Medina. According to Julius Wellhausen, al-Walid's intention was to use Umar to reconcile the townspeople of Medina to Umayyad rule and "obliterate [sic] the evil memory" of the preceding Umayyad governors, namely Hisham ibn Isma'il al-Makhzumi, whose rule over Medina had been harsh for its inhabitants. Umar took up the post in February/March 706 and his jurisdiction later extended to Mecca and Taif.

Information about Umar's governorship is scant, but most traditional accounts note that he was a "just governor", according to historian Paul Cobb. He often led the annual Hajj pilgrimage in Mecca and showed favor toward the Islamic legal scholars of Medina, notably Sa'id ibn al-Musayyab. Umar tolerated many of these scholars' open criticism of the Umayyad government's conduct. Other accounts held him to be materialistic during his early career. On al-Walid's orders, Umar undertook the reconstruction and expansion of the Prophet's Mosque in Medina beginning in 707. Under Umar's generally lenient rule, the Hejaz became a refuge for Iraqi political and religious exiles fleeing the persecutions of al-Hajjaj ibn Yusuf, al-Walid's powerful viceroy over the eastern half of the Caliphate. According to Cobb, this served as Umar's "undoing" as al-Hajjaj pressured the caliph to dismiss Umar in May/June 712. Prompted by al-Hajjaj, al-Walid recalled Umar and split the Hejaz into separate provinces, appointing Uthman ibn Hayyan al-Murri to govern Medina and Khalid ibn Abdallah ibn Khalid ibn Asid to govern Mecca.

== Courtier of al-Walid and Sulayman ==
Despite his dismissal, Umar remained in al-Walid's favor, being the brother of the caliph's first wife, Umm al-Banin bint Abd al-Aziz. He remained in al-Walid's court in Damascus until the caliph's death in 715, and according to the 9th-century historian al-Ya'qubi, he performed the funeral prayers for al-Walid. The latter's brother and successor, Sulayman (r. 715–717), held Umar in high regard. Alongside the influential religious figure Raja ibn Haywa, Umar served as a principal adviser of Sulayman. He accompanied Sulayman when he led the Hajj pilgrimage to Mecca in 716 and on his return to Jerusalem. Likewise, he was at the caliph's side at the Muslims' marshaling camp at Dabiq in northern Syria, where Sulayman directed the massive war effort to conquer the Byzantine capital of Constantinople in 717.

== Caliphate ==
=== Accession ===
According to the traditional Muslim sources, when Sulayman was on his deathbed in Dabiq, Raja persuaded him to designate Umar as his successor. Sulayman's initial nominee had been his son Ayyub, who predeceased him, while his other sons were either too young or away fighting on the Byzantine front. The nomination of Umar voided the wishes of Abd al-Malik, who sought to restrict the office to his direct descendants. The elevation of Umar, a member of a cadet branch of the dynasty, in preference to the numerous descendants of Abd al-Malik surprised these princes. According to Wellhausen, "nobody dreamed of this, himself [Umar] least of all". Raja managed the affair, calling the Umayyad princes into Dabiq's mosque and demanding that they recognize Sulayman's will, which Raja had kept secret. Only after the Umayyads accepted did Raja reveal that Umar was the caliph's nominee. Abd al-Malik's son Hisham voiced his opposition, but relented after being threatened with violence. Umar averted a potential intra-dynastic conflict by designating another of Abd al-Malik's sons, Yazid II, as his successor.

According to the historian Reinhard Eisener, Raja's role in the affair was likely overstated. A more likely possibility was that Umar's succession was the result of "traditional patterns, like seniority and well-founded claims" stemming from Caliph Marwan I's original designation of Umar's father, Abd al-Aziz, as Abd al-Malik's successor, which had not materialized due to Abd al-Aziz predeceasing Abd al-Malik. Umar acceded without significant opposition on 22 September 717.

=== Domestic policies ===
==== Provincial politics ====
Shortly after his accession, Umar overhauled the administrations of the provinces. He appointed competent men that he could control, indicating his intention "to keep a close eye on provincial administration". Wellhausen noted that the caliph did not leave the governors to their own devices in return for their forwarding of the provincial revenues; rather, he actively oversaw his governors' administrations and his main interest was "not so much the increase of power as the establishment of right".

Umar subdivided the vast governorship established over Iraq and the eastern Caliphate under Abd al-Malik's viceroy al-Hajjaj ibn Yusuf. The caliph dismissed and imprisoned the previous governor, Sulayman's appointee Yazid ibn al-Muhallab, because he failed to forward the spoils from his earlier conquest of Tabaristan along the southern Caspian coast to the caliphal treasury. In place of Ibn al-Muhallab, he appointed Abd al-Hamid ibn Abd al-Rahman ibn Zayd ibn al-Khattab (Note: A member of Caliph Umar I's family) to Kufa, Adi ibn Artah al-Fazari to Basra, al-Jarrah ibn Abdallah al-Hakami to Khurasan, Amr ibn Muslim al-Bahili (Note: A brother of the conqueror Qutayba ibn Muslim) to Sind, and Umar ibn Hubayra al-Fazari to the Jazira (Upper Mesopotamia). Although many of these appointees were pupils of al-Hajjaj or affiliated with the Qays faction, Umar chose them based on their reliability and integrity, rather than opposition to Sulayman's government. He appointed al-Samh ibn Malik al-Khawlani to al-Andalus (Iberian Peninsula) and Ismail ibn Ubayd Allah ibn Abi al-Muhajir to Ifriqiya. He chose these governors because of their perceived neutrality in the tribal factionalism between the Qays and Yaman and justice toward the oppressed.

==== Economic reforms ====
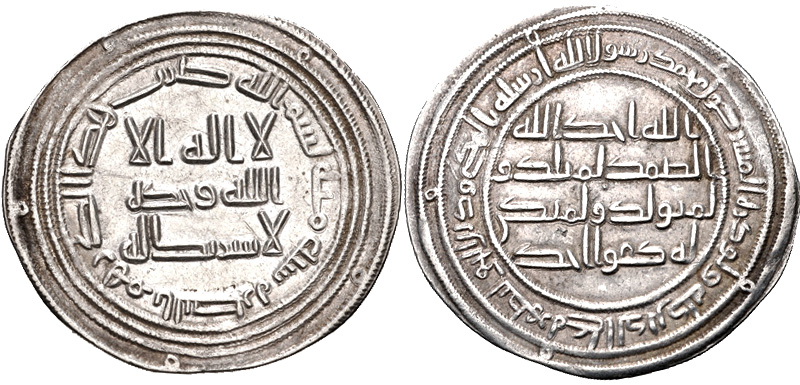
Silver dirham of Umar ibn Abd al-Aziz

Umar's most significant reform was effecting the equality of Arabs and mawali (non-Arab Muslims). This was mainly relevant to the non-Arab troops in the Muslim army, who had not been entitled to the same shares in spoils, lands and salaries given to Arab soldiers. The policy also applied to Muslim society at large. Under previous Umayyad rulers, Arab Muslims had financial privileges over non-Arab Muslims. Non-Arab converts to Islam were still expected to pay the jizya (poll tax) that they paid before becoming Muslims. Umar put into practice a new system that exempted all Muslims, regardless of their heritage, from the jizya tax. He also added some safeguards to the system to make sure that mass conversion to Islam would not cause the collapse of the finances of the Umayyad government. Under the new tax policy, converted mawali would not pay the jizya (or any other dhimmi tax), but upon conversion, their land would become the property of their villages and would thus remain liable to the full rate of the kharaj (land tax). This compensated for the loss of income due to the diminished jizya tax base. He issued an edict on taxation stating:

Whosoever accepts Islam, whether Christian, Jew or Zoroastrian, of those now subject to taxes and who joins himself to the body of the Muslims in their abode, forsaking the abode in which he was before, he shall have the same rights and duties as they have, and they are obliged to associate with him and to treat him as one of themselves.

Umar issued a rescript restricting the Umayyad elites' widespread practice of appropriating crown lands as private estates. In his legal epistle on conquest revenue, Umar regulated the administration of state lands and spoils of war (fay and khums). As part of this policy, Umar relinquished his personal share in the disputed oasis of Fadak, which had been privatized by Marwan I, returning it to its original status as a public charitable trust.

==== Laws and jurisprudence ====
Umar adjusted legal policies regarding wrongful death compensation (diyya, or blood money). Under the first Umayyad caliph, Mu'awiya I, half of the diyya owed to non-Muslim (dhimmi) families was diverted to the state treasury (bayt al-mal). Umar terminated this practice to curb state overreach, but rather than returning the surplus to the victims' families, he left the amount halved, reflecting a regime constrained by financial insecurity and a refusal to grant full legal parity to non-Muslims. His omission established the precedent that later jurists used to permanently limit a non-Muslim's compensation to half that of a Muslim's.

Possibly to stave off potential blowback from opponents of the equalization measures, Umar expanded the Islamization drive that had been steadily strengthening under his Marwanid predecessors. The drive included measures to distinguish Muslims from non-Muslims and the inauguration of an Islamic iconoclasm. According to Khalid Yahya Blankinship, he put a stop to the ritual cursing of Caliph Ali (r. 656–661), the cousin and son-in-law of Muhammad, in Friday prayer sermons. He played a significant role in promoting Muhammad's Sunnah and that of his successors. He is credited with having ordered the first official collection of hadith, fearing that some of it might be lost. This promotion of the sunnah and his commitment to traditional religious authority generated strong opposition from the Qadariyyah, with whom Umar held serious theological disagreements.

=== Military policy ===
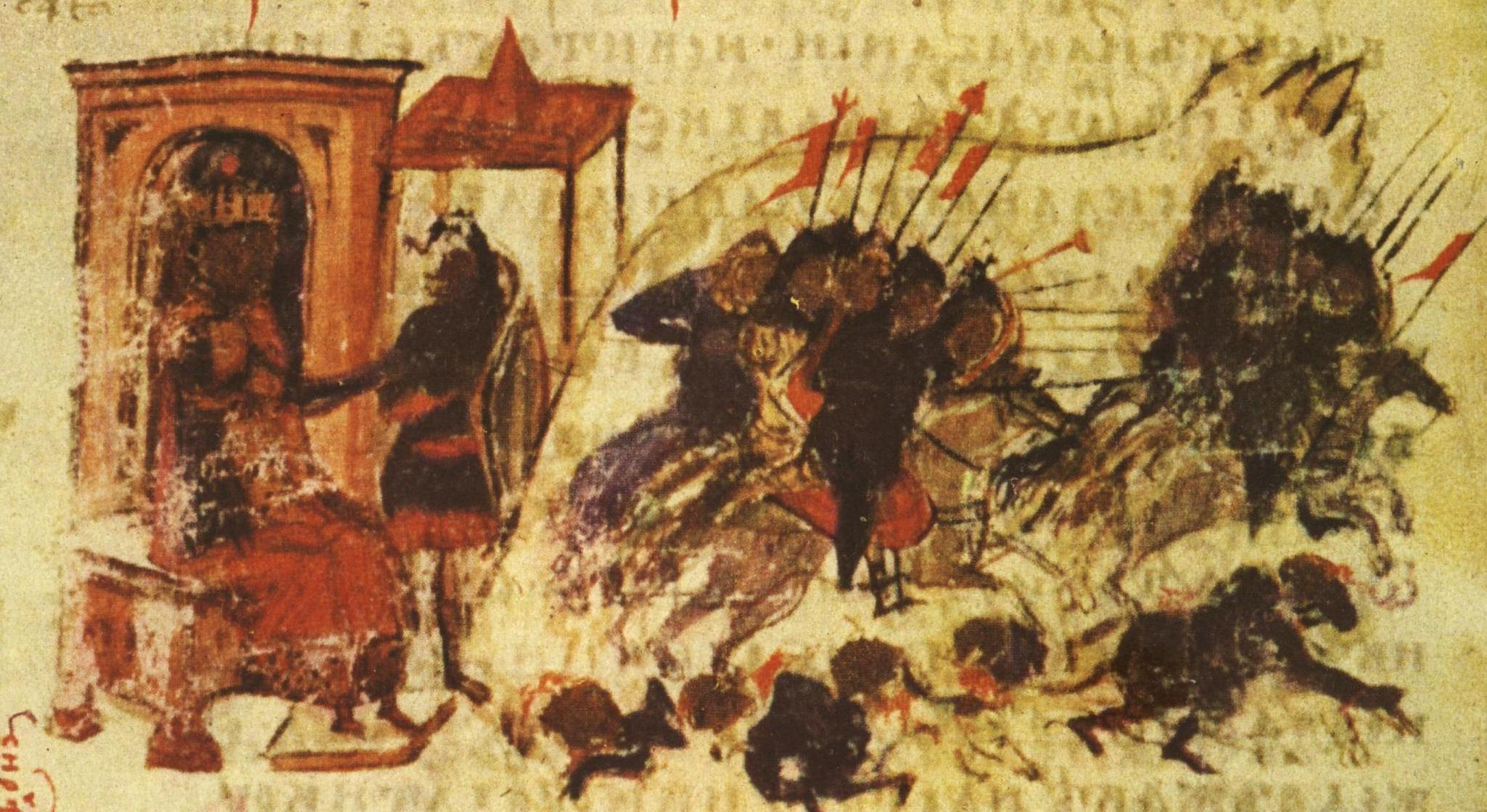
The Second Arab Siege of Constantinople, as depicted in the 14th-century Bulgarian translation of the Manasses Chronicle.

Prompted by the immense costs of the ongoing campaigns, Umar shifted his military priorities upon taking power. He ordered the withdrawal of the Muslim army led by his cousin Maslama ibn Abd al-Malik from their abortive siege against Constantinople to the regions of Antioch and Malatya, closer to the Syrian frontier. He commissioned an expedition in the summer of 718 to facilitate their withdrawal. Umar kept up the annual summer raids against the Byzantine frontier, out of the obligation to jihad (Islamic struggle). He remained in northern Syria, often residing at his estate in Khunasira, where he built a fortified headquarters.

In 717, Umar dispatched a force under Ibn Hatim ibn al-Nu'man al-Bahili to Adharbayjan to disperse a group of Turks who had launched damaging raids against the province. In 718, he deployed Iraqi and Syrian troops to suppress the Kharijite rebellion of Shawdhab al-Yashkuri in Iraq, though some sources suggest that this conflict was ultimately resolved diplomatically. Such a resolution would mirror his instruction to the governor of Iraq to call the dissidents to follow "the Book of God and the sunnah of His Prophet," rather than relying on standard state coercion.

The sources often deem Umar a pacifist and Cobb attributes the caliph's war-weariness to concerns over the diminishing funds of the caliphal treasury. Wellhausen asserts that Umar was "disinclined to wars of conquest, well-knowing that they were waged, not for God, but for the sake of spoil". Blankinship considers this reasoning to be "insufficient". He proposed it was the massive losses faced by the Arabs in their abortive siege against Constantinople, including the destruction of their navy, that caused Umar to view his positions in coastal al-Andalus and Cilicia as acutely vulnerable to Byzantine attack. Thus he favored withdrawing Muslim forces from these two regions. This same line of thinking led to him to consider withdrawing Muslim forces from Transoxiana so as to shore up the defenses of Syria. According to M. A. Shaban, Umar's efforts to halt offensive campaigns were driven by the politically dominant Yamani troops, who resented "continuous military expeditions that required them to be away from their homes." Although he halted further eastward expansion, the establishment of Islam in a number of cities in Transoxiana precluded Umar's withdrawal of Arab troops from there. During his reign, the Muslim forces in al-Andalus conquered and fortified the Mediterranean coastal city of Narbonne in modern-day France.

== Death ==
On his way back from Damascus to Aleppo or possibly to his Khunasira estate, Umar fell ill. He died between 5 February and 10 February 720, at the age of 39, in the village of Dayr Sim'an (also called Dayr al-Naqira) near Maarat al-Numan. Umar had purchased a plot there with his own funds and was buried in the village, where the ruins of his tomb, built at an unknown date, are still visible. Umar was succeeded by Yazid II (r. 720–724). During the Syrian Civil War, militias targeted his grave and shrine twice, with one attack leaving the shrine nearly completely destroyed. The Kalem Foundation restored it in 2025, operating under an official agreement with the Syrian Ministry of Awqaf.

== Assessment and legacy ==
According to English historian Hugh Kennedy, the unanimous view in the Muslim traditional sources is that Umar was pious and ruled like a true Muslim in singular opposition to the other Umayyad caliphs, who were generally considered "godless usurpers, tyrants and playboys". Similarly, Gerald Hawting states that the tradition recognized Umar as an authentic caliph, while the other Umayyads were viewed as kings. In the view of Hawting, this is partly based on the historical facts and Umar's character and actions. He holds that Umar "truly as all evidence indicates was a man of honour, dignity and a ruler worthy of every respect". Umar's status as a pious figure made him the Muslim representative in the celebrated, though likely apocryphal, correspondence between Leo III and Umar II. The Umayyads' fiercest critics recognized this status. Shia Muslim sources praised his virtues, the Kharijite leader Abu Hamza al-Mukhtar did not condemn him, and the Abbasids spared his body from their systematic exhumation and desecration of the bodies of Umayyad caliphs during the Abbasid revolution in 750. Christian authors like Theophanes the Confessor and Michael the Syrian condemned his Islamic zeal.

As a result of Umar's strong reputation and his short term in office, it is difficult to assess the achievements of his caliphate and his motives. Indeed, Kennedy calls Umar "the most puzzling character among the Marwanid rulers". As Kennedy states, "He was a pious individual who attempted to solve the problems of his day in a way which would reconcile the needs of his dynasty and state with the demands of Islam". In the assessment of H. A. R. Gibb, Umar acted to prevent the collapse of the caliphate by "maintaining the unity of the Arabs; removing the grievances of the mawali; and reconciling political life with the claims of religion."

=== Recognition as the Mahdi ===
Before and during his rise to power, Umar was widely regarded in conservative religious circles, particularly in Medina, as the Mahdi or rightly-guided restorer of justice. This perception was closely tied to his maternal descent from Caliph Umar, whose lineage Medinan scholars believed would produce a just leader. Traditionalists such as Said ibn al-Musayyib reportedly identified Umar II with this concept long before his ascension to the caliphate.

This reputation also served a political-theological function in countering rival Kufan claims that the Mahdi would exclusively emerge from the descendants of Ali. The Shia Imam Muhammad al-Baqir was cited as acknowledging that the Mahdi belonged to the Banu Abd-Shams in the person of Umar II. Not all contemporaries shared this view; in Mecca, the traditionist Tawus ibn Kaysan maintained that while Umar was rightly guided, he did not fulfill the definitive definition of the Mahdi, arguing that the true era of the title would bring absolute reward and retribution.

== Family and descendants ==
After Umar's uncle Abd al-Malik recalled him to Damascus following his father's death, he gave his daughter Fatima in marriage to Umar. Umar had two other wives: his maternal cousin Umm Shu'ayb or Umm Uthman, the daughter of Shu'ayb or Sa'id ibn Zabban of the Banu Kalb tribe, and Lamis bint Ali of the Banu al-Harith. According to modern analysis by Andrew Marsham, Umar fathered a total of fourteen children split evenly between his wives and concubines. Classical accounts diverge on the complete roster of his offspring; the list of sons is preserved primarily by al-Ya'qubi, whereas Ibn Sa'd provides a different accounting with alternative names. Additionally, al-Tabari records a son named Abd al-Malik who predeceased his father.

Several of Umar's descendants attained political or military prominence in the decades following his reign. His son Abd al-Aziz served as the governor of Medina from 744 to 747 under Caliph Yazid III. Abd Allah, a son from his Kalbi wife, briefly governed Iraq for the Umayyads before defecting to the Kharijites and aligning with the Kharijite leader al-Dahhak ibn Qays al-Shaybani. He served as Dahhak's governor for Wasit, eastern Iraq, and western Persia while Dahhak governed western Iraq from Kufa. Abd Allah ultimately died in the prison of Caliph Marwan II (r. 744–750) in Harran. The Abbasids purged the Umayyad family across the caliphate in 750, but spared Abd al-Aziz and his son Adam. In fact, Adam gained privilege with the Abbasid caliphs al-Saffah (r. 750–754) and al-Mahdi (r. 775–785). The Abbasids executed others from Umar's line, including his Egypt-based grandson Isa ibn al-Walid and several of his relatives in Palestine.

== Bibliography ==
- Banaji, John (2016). "Late Antique Legacies and Muslim Economic Expansion". In Haldon, John (ed.). Money, Power and Politics in Early Islamic Syria: A Review of Current Debates. Routledge. pp. 165–180. ISBN 978-1-317-09424-1.
- Blankinship, Khalid Yahya (1994). The End of the Jihâd State: The Reign of Hishām ibn ʻAbd al-Malik and the Collapse of the Umayyads. Albany, New York: State University of New York Press. ISBN 978-0-7914-1827-7.
- Blichfeldt, Jan-Olaf (1985). Early Mahdism: Politics and Religion in the Formative Period of Islam. Brill. ISBN 978-90-04-07643-3.
- Borrut, Antoine (2013). "ʿUmar b. ʿAbd al-ʿAzīz". In Bowering, Gerhard; Crone, Patricia; Mirza, Mahan (eds.). The Princeton Encyclopedia of Islamic Political Thought. Princeton: Princeton University Press. pp. 579–580. ISBN 978-0-691-13484-0.
- Burman, Thomas E.; De Castilla, Nuria; Kim, Seonyoung; La Porta, Sergio (2026). A Connecting Polemic in the Medieval Mediterranean: The Correspondence of Leo III and Umar II. Institute for the Study of Ancient Cultures. ISBN 978-1-61491-142-5.
- Cobb, P. M. (2000). "ʿUmar (II) b. ʿAbd al-ʿAzīz". In Bearman, P. J.; Bianquis, Th.; Bosworth, C. E.; van Donzel, E. & Heinrichs, W. P. (eds.). The Encyclopaedia of Islam, Second Edition. Volume X: T–U. Leiden: E. J. Brill. pp. 821–822. ISBN 978-90-04-11211-7.
- Crone, Patricia; Hinds, Martin (1986). God's Caliph - Religious Authority in the First Centuries of Islam. Cambridge: Cambridge University Press. ISBN 0-521-32185-9.
- Eisener, R. (1997). "Sulaymān b. ʿAbd al-Malik". In Bosworth, C. E.; van Donzel, E.; Heinrichs, W. P. & Lecomte, G. (eds.). The Encyclopaedia of Islam, Second Edition. Volume IX: San–Sze. Leiden: E. J. Brill. pp. 821–822. ISBN 978-90-04-10422-8.
- Emon, Anver M. (2012). Religious Pluralism and Islamic Law: Dhimmis and Others in the Empire of Law. Oxford University Press. ISBN 978-0-19-966163-3.
- Gibb, H. A. R. (January 1955). "The Fiscal Rescript of ʿUmar II". Arabica. 2 (1). Brill: 1–16. doi:10.1163/157005855X00158. JSTOR 4055283.
- Hawting, Gerald R. (2000). The First Dynasty of Islam: The Umayyad Caliphate AD 661–750 (Second ed.). London and New York: Routledge. ISBN 0-415-24072-7.
- Ibn Sa'd, Muhammad (2013). Kitāb al-Ṭabaqāt al-Kabīr: The Companions of Badr. Vol. 3. Translated by Aisha Bewley. London: Ta-Ha Publishers. ISBN 978-1842001332.
- Kennedy, Hugh (2004) [1986]. The Prophet and the Age of the Caliphates: The Islamic Near East from the 6th to the 11th Century (Second ed.). Harlow: Longman. ISBN 978-0-582-40525-7.
- Kılınç, Taha (2025). "The legacy of Umar ibn Abd al-Aziz: A grave, a revival, and a moral lineage". Yeni Şafak.
- Madelung, Wilferd (1986). "Al–Mahdi". In Bosworth, C. E.; van Donzel, E.; Lewis, B. & Pellat, Ch. (eds.). The Encyclopaedia of Islam, Second Edition. Volume V: Khe–Mahi. Leiden: E. J. Brill. pp. 1230–1238. ISBN 978-90-04-07819-2.
- Marsham, Andrew (2022). "Kinship, Dynasty, and the Umayyads". The Historian of Islam at Work: Essays in Honor of Hugh N. Kennedy. Leiden: Brill. pp. 12–45. ISBN 978-90-04-52523-8.
- Marsham, Andrew (2024). The Umayyad Empire. Edinburgh: Edinburgh University Press. ISBN 978-1-3995-2739-2.
- Powers, David S., ed. (1989). The History of al-Ṭabarī, Volume XXIV: The Empire in Transition: The Caliphates of Sulaymān, ʿUmar, and Yazīd, A.D. 715–724/A.H. 96–105. SUNY Series in Near Eastern Studies. Albany, New York: State University of New York Press. ISBN 978-0-7914-0072-2.
- Wellhausen, Julius (1927). The Arab Kingdom and Its Fall. Translated by Margaret Graham Weir. Calcutta: University of Calcutta.
- Hinds, Martin, ed. (1990). The History of al-Ṭabarī, Volume XXIII: The Zenith of the Marwānid House: The Last Years of ʿAbd al-Malik and the Caliphate of al-Walīd, A.D. 700–715/A.H. 81–95. SUNY Series in Near Eastern Studies. Albany, New York: State University of New York Press. ISBN 978-0-88706-721-1.
- Landau-Tasseron, Ella, ed. (1998). The History of al-Ṭabarī, Volume XXXIX: Biographies of the Prophet's Companions and their Successors: al-Ṭabarī's Supplement to his History. SUNY Series in Near Eastern Studies. Albany, New York: State University of New York Press. ISBN 978-0-7914-2819-1.
- Gordon, Matthew S.; Robinson, Chase F.; Rowson, Everett K.; Fishbein, Michael, eds. (2018). The Works of Ibn Wāḍiḥ al-Yaʿqūbī: An English Translation. Vol. 3. Brill. ISBN 978-90-04-36416-5.
- Williams, John Alden, ed. (1985). The History of al-Ṭabarī, Volume XXVII: The ʿAbbāsid Revolution, A.D. 743–750/A.H. 126–132. SUNY Series in Near Eastern Studies. Albany, New York: State University of New York Press. ISBN 978-0-87395-884-4.
- McMillan, M.E. (2011). The Meaning of Mecca: The Politics of Pilgrimage in Early Islam. London: Saqi. ISBN 978-0-86356-437-6.
- Caetani, Leone (1923). Cronografia generale del bacino mediterraneo e dell'oriente musulmano dal 622 al 1517 dell'era volgare, ossia dal principio dell'era musulmana alla caduta dell'Egitto in potere dei Turchi ottomani Periodo 2 [General Chronology of the Mediterranean Basin and the Muslim East from 622 to 1517 of the Common Era—that is, from the beginning of the Muslim era to the fall of Egypt to the Ottoman Turks: Period 2] (in Italian). Rome: Fondazione Caetani and R. Accademia Nazionale del Lincei.
- Anthony, Sean W. (2024). "A 'Rediscovered' Letter of the Umayyad Caliph ʿUmar b. ʿAbd al-ʿAzīz (r. 99–101/717–720): Caliphal Authorship and Legal Authority in al-Risāla fī l-fayʾ". Late Antique Legacies and Early Islam. Leiden: Brill. pp. 47–88. doi:10.1163/9789004690615_005. ISBN 978-90-04-69061-5.

Umar ibn Abd al-Aziz Umayyad dynasty Born: ca. 680 Died: February 720
Preceded by Sulayman	Caliph of Islam; Umayyad Caliph; 22 September 717–February 720	Succeeded by Yazid II
Political offices
Preceded by Hisham ibn Isma'il al-Makhzumi	Governor of Medina; March 706–May 712	Succeeded by Uthman ibn Hayyan al-Murri
