= Muhammad ibn Khalid al-Qasri =

Abbasid governor of Mecca, Medina, Taif

Muhammad ibn Khalid al-Qasri محمد بن خالد القسري

Governor of Medina, Mecca, Taif
- In office 758–760/1
- Monarch: al-Mansur
- Preceded by: Ziyad ibn Ubayd Allah al-Harithi
- Succeeded by: Riyah ibn Uthman al-Murri

Personal details
- Died: Abbasid Caliphate
- Parent: Khalid al-Qasri (father)
- Military career
- Allegiance: Abbasid Caliphate
- Branch: Umayyad army
- Conflicts: Abbasid Revolution

Muhammad ibn Khalid al-Qasri (Arabic: محمد بن خالد القسري) was a son of the famed Khalid al-Qasri, the longtime (724–738) governor of al-Iraq for the Umayyads.

During the Abbasid Revolution, he participated in the uprising at Kufa at the approach of the Abbasid army, and later was appointed governor of Mecca, Medina, and Ta'if by the Abbasid caliph al-Mansur.

== Sources ==
- Crone, Patricia (1980). Slaves on Horses: The Evolution of the Islamic Polity (1980 ed.). Cambridge: Cambridge University Press. ISBN 978-0521229616.
