= Hisham ibn Isma'il al-Makhzumi =

Umayyad governor of Medina from 701 to 706

Governor of Medina
- In office 701/2–706
- Monarch: Al-Walid I
- Preceded by: Aban ibn Uthman
- Succeeded by: Umar ibn Abd al-Aziz

Personal details
- Relations: Banu Makhzum (clan); Al-Walid ibn al-Mughira (great-grandfather); Hisham ibn Abd al-Malik (grandson)
- Children: Ibrahim; Muhammad; Khalid; A'isha
- Parent: Isma'il ibn Hisham al-Makhzumi

Hisham ibn Isma'il al-Makhzumi (Arabic: هشام بن إسماعيل المخزومي, romanized: Hishām ibn Ismāʿīl al-Makhzūmī) was an 8th-century official of the Umayyad Caliphate, and the maternal grandfather of Caliph Hisham ibn Abd al-Malik. He served as the governor of Medina from 701 to 706.

== Family ==
Hisham was a member of the Banu Makhzum, a clan of the Arab tribe of Quraysh, being a great-grandson of al-Walid ibn al-Mughira. Hisham gained prominence when his daughter A'isha married the fifth Umayyad caliph Abd al-Malik ibn Marwan (r. 685–705). In 691 he became a grandfather to the future caliph Hisham ibn Abd al-Malik (r. 724–743), who was reportedly named after him at A'isha's insistence. Hisham's sons Ibrahim and Muhammad, like their father under Abd al-Malik, served as governors of Medina for Hisham ibn Abd al-Malik. They fell out of favour during the reign of his successor al-Walid ibn Yazid (r. 743–744) and were tortured to death by Yusuf ibn Umar al-Thaqafi in 743. A third son, Khalid, participated in the failed rebellion of Hisham ibn Abd al-Malik's son Sulayman in 744 and was consequently executed by the caliph Marwan ibn Muhammad (r. 744–750).

Family tree of Hisham ibn Isma'il al-Makhzumi

Al-Mughira ibn Abd Allah ibn Umar ibn Makhzum
Al-Walid (d. 622)
Al-Walid (d. 620s)	Hisham	Khalid (d. 642)
Abd Allah	Isma'il	Abd al-Rahman (d. 666)
Salama	Hisham (fl. 691–706)
Ya'qub	Ayyub	Ibrahim	Muhammad	Khalid	A'isha	Abd al-Malik (Umayyad caliph, 685–705)
Umm Salama	Al-Saffah (Abbasid caliph, 750–754)	Hisham (Umayyad caliph, 724–743)

== Governor of Medina ==
Abd al-Malik appointed Hisham, his father-in-law, governor of Medina in 701. During his time in that position he dismissed Nawfal ibn Musahiq al-Amiri from the head of the judiciary and appointed Amr ibn Khalid al-Zuraqi in his stead, and led the people of the city in rendering the oath of allegiance to Abd al-Malik's sons al-Walid I (r. 705–715) and Sulayman (r. 715–717). When the faqih Sa'id ibn al-Musayyab refused to give the oath, Hisham ordered him to be beaten and imprisoned, and subjected him to a mock execution by having him marched to a mountain pass where individuals would normally be killed and crucified. Hisham also led the annual Hajj pilgrimages to Mecca in 703 and 704, and possibly those of 702/3 and 705 as well.

Following the death of Abd al-Malik in 705, Hisham was initially confirmed as governor by his successor al-Walid I. The new caliph disliked Hisham, however, and in early 706 he dismissed him in favour of Umar ibn Abd al-Aziz. Al-Walid also instructed Umar to display Hisham in front of the people of Medina, as a form of humiliation for his conduct during his governorship, but Hisham was spared from further harm after both Sa'id ibn al-Musayyab and the Alid Ali ibn al-Husayn ordered their followers to refrain from acts of retaliation against him.

== Notes ==
Preceded by Aban ibn Uthman ibn Affan	Governor of Medina; 701–706	Succeeded by Umar ibn Abd al-Aziz
