= Hazem (UAV) =

Unmanned aerial vehicle

Hazem (Persian: پهپاد حازم) is a type of unmanned aerial vehicle (UAV) used by the armed forces of the Islamic Republic of Iran.

The Hazem is a long-range UAV that can also be used to bombard targets. According to the commander of the air defense headquarters, the Hazem was designed in three models; short, medium and long range. They were created for a hidden layer Anbiya Air Defense Base Camp by air defense experts. The UAV is used in reconnaissance missions. Hazem UAVs can be armed with explosives.

One researcher says the Hazem is unlikely to have a serious tactical impact for Iran in high-intensity warfare because of the drone's lack of stealth.

== Models ==
- Hazem 1: long-range
- Hazem 2: medium-range
- Hazem 3: short-range
