= Abu Bakr ibn Muhammad ibn Amr ibn Hazm =

Abu Bakr ibn Muhammad ibn Amr ibn Hazm (Arabic: أبو بكر بن محمد بن عمرو بن حزم) (died 120/737) was an 8th-century Sunni Islamic scholar based in Madinah.

He is among those who compiled hadiths at Umar II's behest. Umar asked him to write down all the hadiths he could learn in Madinah from 'Amra bint 'Abd al-Rahman, who was at the time the most respected scholar of hadiths narrated by Aisha, the wife of the Islamic prophet Muhammad.

== See also ==
- Abu Bakr (name)
- Muhammad (name)
- Hazm (name)
