= Hisham ibn Abd al-Malik =

Umayyad caliph from 724 to 743

Hisham ibn Abd al-Malik هِشَام ابْن عَبْد الْمَلِك
- Amir al-Mu'minin; Khalifat Allah
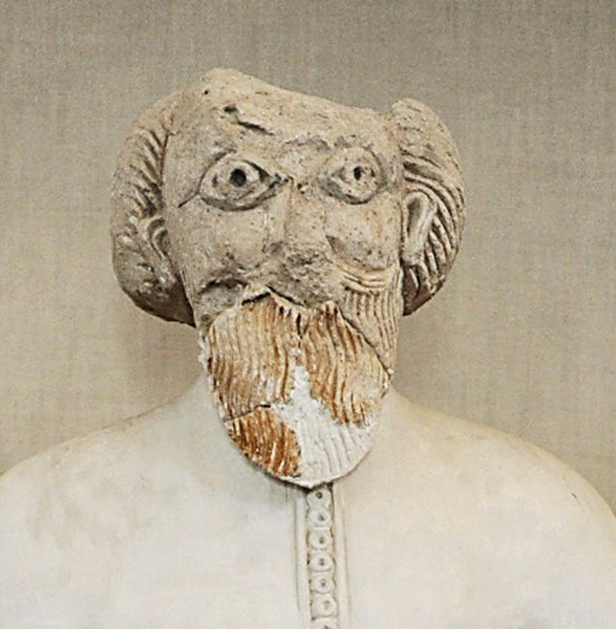
- Statue of Hisham ibn Abd al-Malik in Khirbat al-Mafjar, near Jericho

10th Caliph of the Umayyad Caliphate
- Reign: 26 January 724 – 6 February 743
- Predecessor: Yazid II
- Successor: Al-Walid II
- Born: 691; Damascus, Syria, Umayyad Caliphate
- Died: 6 February 743 (aged c. 52) (6 Rabiʽ al-Thani 125 AH); Damascus, Syria, Umayyad Caliphate
- Spouse: Umm Hakim bint Yahya ibn al-Hakam; Ruqayya bint Abd Allah ibn Amr ibn Uthman; Umm Uthman bint Sa'id ibn Khalid ibn Amr ibn Uthman; Abda bint Abd Allah ibn Yazid I
- Issue: Maslama; Mu'awiya; Sulayman; Yazid al-Afqam; Sa'id; Marwan; Abd Allah; Abd al-Rahman; Muhammad; Quraysh; Aisha
- House: Marwanid
- Dynasty: Umayyad
- Father: Abd al-Malik ibn Marwan
- Mother: Aisha bint Hisham
- Religion: Islam

Hisham ibn Abd al-Malik ibn Marwan (Note: Arabic: هِشَام ابْن عَبْد الْمَلِك ٱبْن مَرْوَان, romanized: Hishām ibn ʿAbd al-Malik ibn Marwān) (c. 691 – 6 February 743) was the tenth Umayyad caliph, ruling from 724 until his death in 743. Hisham succeeded his brother Yazid II and presided over one of the longest reigns of the Umayyad Caliphate. His grandson Abd al-Rahman I later founded the Emirate of Córdoba.

Hisham's reign saw major military and political challenges. The caliphate suffered setbacks against the Türgesh in Transoxiana, fought a prolonged war with the Khazars, and continued its conflict with the Byzantine Empire. Hisham also faced the Berber Revolt in North Africa and the revolt of Zayd ibn Ali in Iraq. Within the caliphate, he sought to manage competing tribal factions through provincial appointments and changes in the governorships of Iraq and the eastern provinces. His administration also promoted significant agricultural and commercial development, particularly in Syria, the Jazira, and Iraq.

Towards the end of his reign, Hisham sought to overturn the succession arrangement which named al-Walid II as heir and instead secure the succession for his son Maslama. He failed to do so despite his son Maslama receiving support from Hisham's brother Maslama ibn Abd al-Malik, Hisham's sons, and key tribal chiefs.

== Early life ==
Hisham was born in Damascus, the administrative capital of the Umayyad Caliphate, in AH 72 (691–692 CE). His father was the Umayyad caliph Abd al-Malik (r. 685–705). His mother, A'isha, was a daughter of Hisham ibn Isma'il of the Banu Makhzum, a prominent family of the Quraysh, and Abd al-Malik's longtime governor of the Islamic holy cities of Mecca and Medina. (Note: An anecdote cited in several early Islamic sources holds that Abd al-Malik had wanted to name Hisham 'al-Mansur' ('the Victor') because he heard the news of his birth shortly after his victory over the ruler of Iraq, Mus'ab ibn al-Zubayr. A'isha, who had been divorced by the caliph by that time, named their son Hisham after her father instead.) According to the history of al-Tabari (d. 923), Hisham was given the kunya (patronymic) of Abu al-Walid.

There is little information about Hisham's early life. He was too young to play any political or military role during his father's reign. He supposedly led the Hajj pilgrimage to Mecca once during his brother al-Walid I's reign (r. 705–715) and while there, met a respected descendant of Caliph Ali (r. 656–661), Zayn al-Abidin. Hisham is credited by al-Tabari for leading an expedition against the Byzantines across the Caliphate's frontier in 706 and capturing a number of their fortified positions.

Hisham began to demonstrate aspirations for the caliphate at the death of his brother, Caliph Sulayman (r. 715–717) in 717. On his deathbed, Sulayman had nominated as his successor their paternal first cousin, Umar ibn Abd al-Aziz, but kept the order secret, entrusting the revelation to his chief adviser Raja ibn Haywa. When Raja informed the Umayyad family of the decision, Hisham protested that the caliphal office was the preserve of Abd al-Malik's direct descendants and only relented from his opposition when threatened by force. He played no political or military role under Umar (r. 717–720) but is mentioned in a 10th-century biography of Umar as having issued a letter to the caliph complaining of his and his brothers' treatment under the caliph's rule. Hisham also held no posts under his brother, Caliph Yazid II (r. 720–724).

== Caliphate ==
=== Accession ===
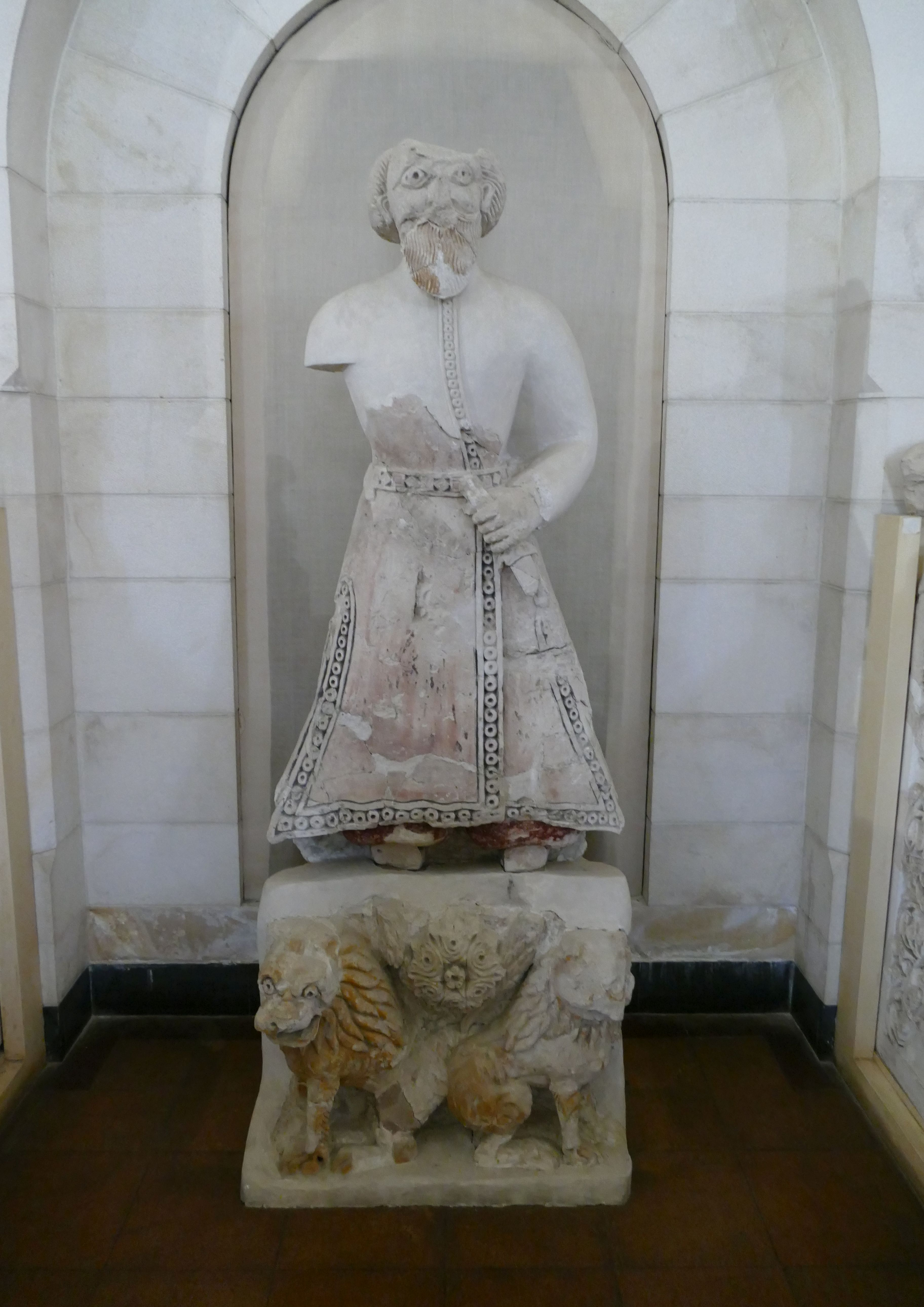
Sasanian-inspired standing caliph statue from Hisham's Palace, possibly a depiction of the caliph himself, Jerusalem, Rockefeller Museum

Upon the counsel of their brother, the prominent general Maslama ibn Abd al-Malik, Yazid nominated Hisham as his successor over his own son al-Walid II, whom he had originally intended to designate as first-in-line. Hisham acceded after Yazid died in January 724. He received the news while at his Syrian desert estate, al-Zaytuna, which is identified as Qasr al-Hayr al-Gharbi, near Hisham's favored residence, al-Rusafa, which is identified as Qasr al-Hayr al-Sharqi. He was given the caliphal ring and staff by a postal messenger, after which he rode to Damascus, where he was publicly acclaimed as caliph.

=== Domestic policies ===
==== Provincial politics ====
Among Hisham's first acts was the dismissal of Umar ibn Hubayra al-Fazari from the governorship of Iraq in March 724. Ibn Hubayra had governed as a partisan stalwart of the Qays–Mudar, one of the two tribal-military factions of the caliphate, and aggressively suppressed the opposing Yaman–Rabi'a and its champions, the Muhallabid family. Hisham aimed to neutralize the partisan politics in the eastern caliphate by replacing Ibn Hubayra with Khalid ibn Abdallah al-Qasri, a staunch loyalist of the Umayyad family and member of the factionally neutral Bajila tribe. Hisham extended Khalid's jurisdiction beyond Iraq to the Iranian provinces and Khurasan, i.e. the eastern half of the caliphate. Khalid played a role similar to the Umayyads' former powerful viceroys of the east, Ziyad ibn Abihi and al-Hajjaj ibn Yusuf, though he lacked their reputation for statesmanship and energetic leadership.

Khalid's fifteen-year term in the east was largely stable and peaceful, save for minor and abortive Kharijite and Shia disturbances in the Jazira and Kufa, respectively, in 737. Despite Khalid's ostensible neutrality, the Qays–Mudar perceived him as an opponent for replacing their benefactor, Ibn Hubayra. Lobbying by the Qays-Mudar or jealousy of Khalid's lucrative enterprises in Iraq led Hisham to dismiss Khalid in 738. Although the Yaman had not necessarily embraced Khalid during his governorship, he became strongly identified with Yamani interests as a result of his dismissal and imprisonment by Hisham's new appointee, Yusuf ibn Umar al-Thaqafi, who restored Qaysi–Mudari dominance of the east.

==== Economy and infrastructure ====
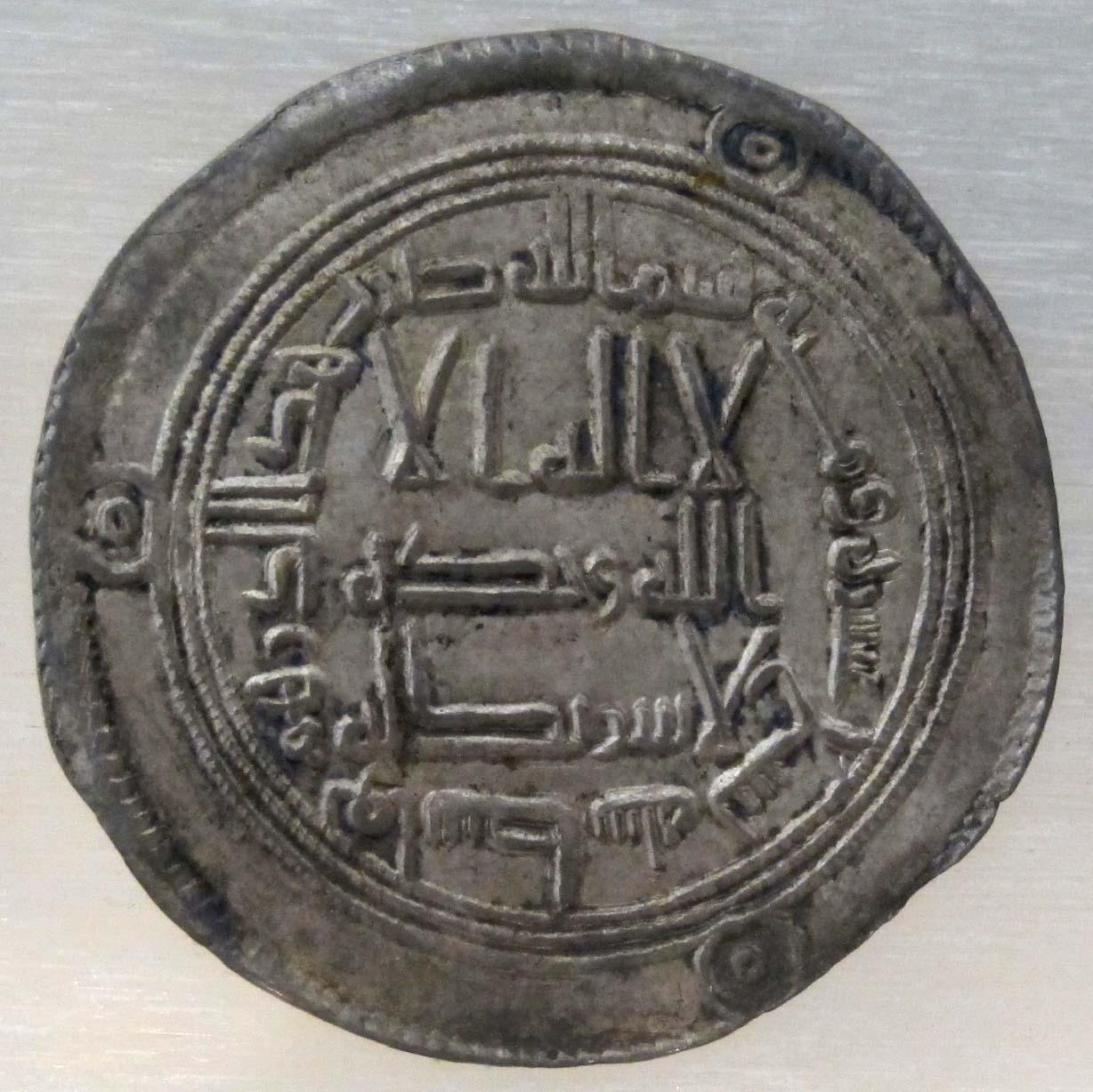
An Umayyad coin issued by Hisham ibn Abd al-Malik.

Under Hisham, the northern frontiers, the Jazira, and Iraq experienced a major economic revitalization. Following the final pacification of the Jazira and Iraq at the beginning of the eighth century, Hisham and the elites of his court heavily invested in the development of irrigation farming and the promotion of interregional trade across northern Syria, the Jazira, and Iraq.

The region, which had seen a decline in exchange routes since the Roman–Persian frontier split the Euphrates valley in late antiquity, regained its importance as a major zone of communication and interaction. Hisham accumulated substantial revenues from agricultural estates around Resafa, Raqqa, Mosul, and Edessa, as well as from the area irrigated by the Nahr Dawrin south of the Khabur outlet. Alongside the caliph, wealthy entrepreneurs such as his brother Maslama and his long-serving governor of Iraq, Khalid, derived immense wealth from land cultivation and commercial ventures in the region.

Hisham actively patronized urban commerce and market infrastructure throughout his domains. Following tribal clashes during the reign of Yazid II that destroyed a marketplace near the Rastan Gate in Homs, Hisham ordered the market rebuilt, leading it to become known as Suq Hisham. Similarly, his investments at Resafa transformed the former military and religious outpost into a thriving center of trade by constructing a new marketplace near the cathedral that drew numerous merchants, while also founding the Suq al-Atik market in nearby Kallinicos. Despite facing fiscal pressures during his twenty-year reign, Hisham directed economic energies toward provincial development, promoting markets in Medina and funding construction projects in the provinces rather than prioritizing personal expenditure on the Hajj.

State-backed development also targeted resource-rich frontier zones like Armenia and the Caucasus for their gold and iron mines, while copper mines near Mosul secured provisions for Iraq. Under the direct patronage of Hisham and his governors, commercial infrastructure was expanded, markets and public buildings were erected, and trade routes were secured to bolster both local governmental funds and the caliphal purse.

=== External challenges ===
==== Khurasan and the eastern frontier ====
Watershed of the Oxus River in the 8th century, showing eastern Khurasan and Transoxiana and its principal localities to the northeast

During the reign of Caliph al-Walid I (r. 705–715), the territories east of Khurasan, in particular Transoxiana and Tukharistan, had been conquered by Umayyad forces but other than the Arab garrisons set up in Samarkand, Bukhara and Balkh, these regions remained largely self-administered by local Iranian and Turkic rulers. Not long after the conquests, there rose a confederation of Turkic nomads in Transoxiana, the Chinese-backed Turgesh under the khaqan Suluk, which countered Arab influence. The Arab troops of Khurasan (ahl Khurasan, 'the Khurasani army') were riven by divisions along Qaysi–Mudari and Yamani-Raba'i factional lines, which weakened their standing.

Not long after Hisham's accession, in 724, the Khurasani army under the governor Muslim ibn Sa'id al-Kilabi was trapped by the Turgesh and Sogdian rebels while besieging Ferghana. Their predicament was partly caused by the Yamani troops' refusal to engage while waiting for direction from Ibn Hubayra's incoming replacement, Khalid. In a precarious retreat known as the Day of Thirst, the Khurasani army extricated itself to safety in Samarkand after an eight-day trek. The event left Arab forces on the defensive, with no further conquests undertaken in the east until 739. Khalid appointed his brother Asad ibn Abdallah al-Qasri in Muslim's place. Asad worked to reconcile the local population, relieving Muslim converts from the jizya, a poll tax ostensibly restricted to non-Muslims but generally extended to non-Arab Muslim converts, and making inroads with the Sogdian nobility. His military activities focused on consolidating Umayyad rule west of the Oxus River, with moderately successful campaigns in Ghur and Gharjistan. The Arab soldiery resented Asad's tax overtures to the locals and he alienated them by publicly flogging the leaders of the Khurasani army's main tribal factions.

Hisham consequently dismissed Asad in 727 and removed Khurasan from Khalid's overlordship. Blankinship speculates Hisham was alarmed by the slow pace of military progress in the east and the restlessness of the Khurasani troops and thus chose a governor from the more reliable Syro-Jaziran army (ahl al-Sham), Ashras ibn Abdallah al-Sulami, with a contingent of Jaziran troops as reinforcements. In 729/730, Ashras reduced taxes on converts, leading to mass conversions among the local populace. The resulting prospect of diminished revenues led Ashras to impose humiliating verification measures, namely circumcision tests, and eventually reimpose taxes on converts. This provoked a widescale uprising in Transoxiana, which coincided with an invasion by the Turgesh. The Umayyads consequently lost control of the territory by 728, save for Samarkand and the two minor posts of Kamarja (few leagues west of Samarkand) and Dabusiyya. After lengthy and bitter fighting, Ashras regained control of Bukhara and his troops withstood a two-month siege of Kamarja by the Turgesh. Nevertheless, by the end of Ashras's term in 730, the Umayyad frontier had receded substantially from its place at the start of Hisham's reign and much further still from its limits at Ferghana during al-Walid I's reign. Moreover, the Khurasani troops were becoming exhausted by the ceaseless, costly and unrewarding campaigns.

In 731, the Turgesh besieged Samarkand, while the bulk of the Khurasani army under Ashras's successor, Junayd ibn Abd al-Rahman al-Murri, was suppressing rebellions across Tukharistan. Junayd's attempt to relieve the siege ended in disaster, as the Khurasani army and the defenders of Samarkand were decimated by the Turgesh in the Battle of the Defile. To compensate the troop losses, Hisham ordered the remobilization of 15,000 fighters from the Iraqi garrisons, which were historically opposed to the Umayyad dynasty, and the recruitment of an equal amount of fighters from amongst the tribesmen in Khurasan. Although the Muslims retained Samarkand in the battle, they lost it to the Turgesh between then and 735, during which the Muslims' possessions in Transoxiana were restricted to Bukhara, Kish and al-Saghaniyan. Junayd's term in office left the Khurasani army increasingly disaffected and strained the finances of the caliphate as no war booty was gained, while Hisham expended considerable sums to equip the large number of reinforcements.

Hisham appointed in Junayd's place Asim ibn Abd Allah al-Hilali, who immediately had to contend with a massive and unprecedented revolt of Khurasani Arab troops and Iranian mawali led by al-Harith ibn Surayj. Vacillating taxation policies on Muslim converts had bred dissent and frequent rebellion among the local population, creating fertile ground for anti-Umayyad Arab rebels to make common cause with local converts along religious lines. Among his demands, al-Harith called for the jizya on the mawali to be abolished, a call hearkening back to the reforms of Umar II and the abortive reforms of Ashras. The rebels captured Balkh and threatened Asim in Merv, the provincial capital of Khurasan. While Asim beat back al-Harith, he soon after came to terms, going as far as issuing a joint letter with al-Harith demanding Hisham abide by the Quran and sunnah. This signaled Asim's weak position among the Khurasani troops, particularly its Mudari Tamim and Yamani Azd and Rabi'a elements, and territorially, as his control was limited to Merv and the loyalist Qaysi center of Nishapur.

With both the Khurasani troops and the Iraqi reinforcements deemed unreliable, Hisham resolved to dispatch a Syrian army to Khurasan under the reappointed Asad ibn Abdallah al-Qasri in 735. Asad and the Syrians won a string of victories against al-Harith and returned many Khurasani troops, particularly from the Yamani side, to the Umayyad fold. By 736, Balkh and Tukharistan were recaptured and became a base for the Syrians and al-Harith's rebellion collapsed. In 737, as Asad's troops were campaigning in the Khuttal, the Turgesh set upon them. In the ensuing Battle of Kharistan, the Muslims dispersed the Turgesh and captured the camp and spoils, though Suluk and al-Harith both escaped. The rare signal victory at Kharistan reportedly amazed Hisham, who had become accustomed to news of defeats and setbacks in the east. While modern historians dismiss the battle as no more than a skirmish, the Muslim victory there and Suluk's assassination in the following year by Turgesh rivals ended Turgesh invasions of Transoxiana and Khurasan and the Turkic confederation collapsed.

Asad died in February 738 and later that year Hisham appointed Nasr ibn Sayyar al-Kinani as governor. The Khurasani army chafed at the presence of Syrian troops in their province and Nasr, a local commander from a small Mudari tribe, was likely chosen by Hisham to placate the Khurasanis while keeping the more effective Syrians deployed. To help reconsolidate the Muslim position in Khurasan, Nasr enacted the tax reforms long sought by the mawali, terminating their jizya obligations. At the same time, he reimposed it on substantial numbers of non-Muslims who had been exempted and enforced the collection of land taxes (kharaj across the districts that had submitted to Muslim rule. He thereafter moved to reestablish the caliphate's control over Transoxiana, taking back Samarkand without a fight in 740, and at least restoring the tributary status of areas further east like Shash and Ferghana by 741, while finally reconciling the Sogdian population to Muslim rule.

==== Wars with the Khazars ====
Political map of the Caucasus, c. 740

On the caliphate's northern, Caucasian frontier, the Umayyads had been engaged in an ever-intensfying war with the Khazars, a Turkic and largely nomadic steppe power based around the Volga, since 715. Not long after his accession, Hisham promised but failed to send Syrian reinforcements to the commander of the Muslim troops there, al-Jarrah ibn Abdallah al-Hakami, a Yamani of the Syrian army. Although al-Jarrah had achieved relative success under Yazid II and solidified Arab rule over Tiflis under Hisham in 725, Hisham appointed his own half-brother, the celebrated general Maslama ibn Abd al-Malik, in al-Jarrah's place in 726. Maslama drew his troops from the Qaysi tribes of Qinnasrin and the Jazira and his appointment was partly to placate the Qays–Mudar after removing them from power in Iraq and the east in 724. Maslama's term was a mixed success, culminating with a pyrrhic victory over the Khazar khaqan on his territory in 728, which failed to subdue the Khazars or end their increasing raids against Muslim territory in Adharbayjan. Hisham dismissed Maslama in 729, with the traditional sources suggesting he had become leery of Maslama's popularity from the 728 campaign.

Hisham restored al-Jarrah as commander of the northern frontier provinces of Adharbayjan and Arminiya but he was slain and his troops were annihilated by the Khazars at the Battle of Marj Ardabil in 730. The Khazars then sacked Ardabil, the capital of Adharbayjan and the main Arab garrison and marshaling point on the northern frontier and took captive the troops' families. The Khazars continued their raids, reaching as far as the environs of Mosul, marking the deepest such attack against the caliphate by an external enemy. This series of disasters shocked Hisham, who dispatched the veteran Qaysi general Sa'id ibn Amr al-Harashi. He scored a series of victories against the Khazars, recapturing Akhlat in Arminiya, raising the Khazar siege of Warthan, and rescuing many or most of the Muslim captives and routing the army of the Khazar khaqan's son near Bajarwan.

While Sa'id was advancing against the Khazars, Hisham reappointed Maslama as governor. Maslama recalled and imprisoned Sa'id, supposedly jealous of his battle victories but Hisham intervened to have Sa'id released. With his Syrian and Jaziran troops, Maslama campaigned in Khazar country, attacking Khamzin, Balanjar and Samandar, though the Khazars had already retreated from all these places by the time the Arabs arrived. In 731, Maslama founded a new garrison city at Derbent (al-Bab lit. 'the Gate' to the Arabs), providing for a permanent Syrian expeditionary base in the Caucasus. Hisham retired Maslama from service the following year and appointed another Umayyad prince, their cousin Marwan ibn Muhammad (the future Caliph Marwan II). Among Marwan's early acts was granting practical autonomy to the Armenian prince Ashot the Bagratid in return for a steady supply of troops to combat the Khazars. Marwan arrested and sent Ashot's traditional rivals within his Bagratid and Mamikonian families to Hisham, who had the latter exiled to Yemen while keeping the former detained at Rusafa. According to Blankinship, the arrangement levying Christian Armenian troops and granting them autonomy and considerable sums signaled the desperation of the caliph amid the Khazar threat and the heavy loss of Syrian manpower on that front.

Marwan was replaced with Sa'id soon after, possibly an indication of Hisham's impatience with the slow progress against the Khazars, but was restored to office in 734 when Sa'id lost his eyesight. The Muslims spent the period between 732 and 737 subduing minor princes across the Caucasus and consolidating their rear. In 737, Marwan persuaded Hisham to equip him with the largest army ever sent against the Khazars. Marwan attacked the Khazar capital at Atil, though this was probably nothing more than a nomadic encampment, and defeated the Khazars at a swampland. While this represented the climax of the Arab–Khazar wars, the outcome was insignificant, though the consistent Arab war efforts since 730 had likely deterred the Khazars from further raids against the caliphate south of the Caucasus. On the other hand, while the Caucasian frontier had stabilized by 740, the caliphate gained little booty from the years-long campaigns as Khazaria had little to offer, while expending considerable numbers of troops and treasure.

==== Byzantine frontier ====
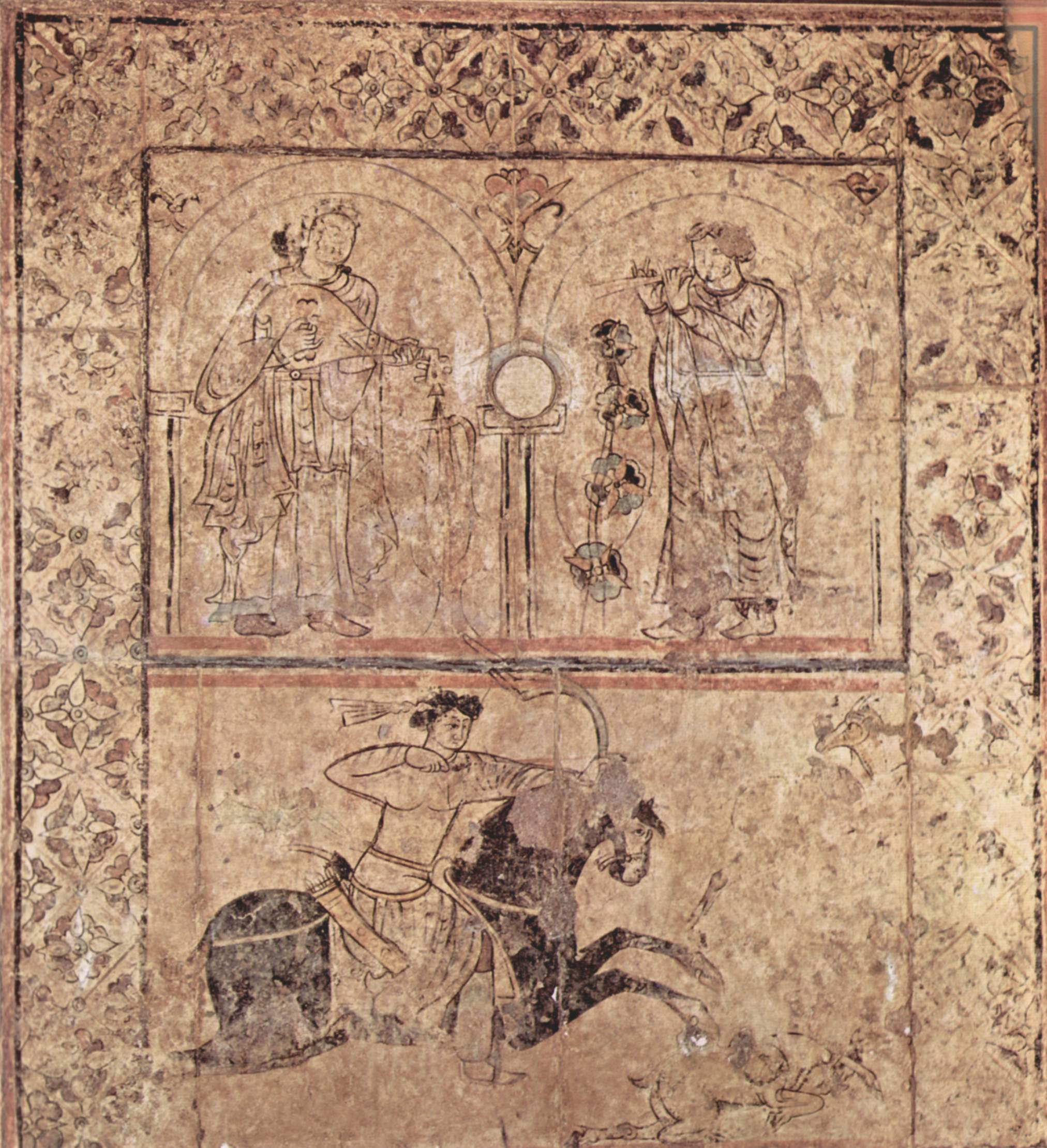
Musicians and hunting cavalryman, circa 730 CE. Floor fresco from Qasr al-Hayr al-Gharbi, Syria. National Museum, Damascus.

Under Hisham's rule, regular raids against the Byzantine Empire continued. One regular commander of Arab forces was the redoubtable Maslama, Hisham's half-brother. He fought the Byzantines in 725–726 CE (A.H. 107) and the next year captured Caesarea Mazaca. He also fought the Khazars in the Caucasus. In 728, he fought for a month against the Khaqan there and defeated him. Hisham's son Mu'awiya was another Arab commander in the almost-annual raids against the Byzantine Empire. In 728, he took the fort of Samalu in Cilicia. The next year Mu'awiya thrust left and Sa'id ibn Hisham right, in addition to a sea raid. In 731, Mu'awiya captured Kharsianon in Cappadocia.

Mu'awiya raided the Byzantine Empire in 731–732 (A.H. 113). The next year he captured Aqrun (Akroinos), while Abdallah al-Battal took a Byzantine commander prisoner. Mu'awiya raided Byzantium from 734–737. In 737, al Walid ibn al Qa'qa al-Absi led the raid against the Byzantines. The next year Sulayman ibn Hisham captured Sideroun. In 738–739, Maslama captured some of Cappadocia and also raided the Avars. Theophanes the Confessor (p. 103) states that while some Arabs raided successfully in 739 and returned home safely, others were soundly defeated at the Battle of Akroinon. He records that internal Byzantine strife (the struggle between Constantine V and the usurper Artabasdos) facilitated Arab raids by Sulayman ibn Hisham in 741–742 (p. 106) that made many Byzantines Arab captives. Al-Tabari refers to the same raid.

==== Invasion of Gaul ====
In Al-Andalus, the internal conflicts of the years past were ended, and Hisham's governor, Abd al-Rahman ibn Abd Allah al-Ghafiqi, assembled a large army that went into Gaul. He besieged Bordeaux and pushed to the Loire. This marked the limit of Arabic conquest in Gaul. The wave was halted at the Battle of Tours by Charles Martel who ruled the kingdom of the Franks, with exception of the Fraxinetum enclave which lasted until the 10th century.

=== Internal challenges ===
==== Berber revolt ====
Permanent Arab rule over the Maghreb (western North Africa) did not take effect until c. 695 and the Berber natives who predominated there resisted impositions by the Umayyad caliphs. In response to Yazid II's reimposition of the jizya tax on Berber converts to Islam in 720, Berber guards killed his governor in Ifriqiya (central North Africa), Yazid ibn Abi Muslim, under whose jurisdiction the Maghreb fell, and compelled him to reappoint a former governor, Muhammad ibn Yazid. Hisham kept Ibn Yazid in place until his death in 727, after which he installed Ubayd Allah ibn al-Habhab. Berber grievances mounted during Hisham's reign. Among these were consistent discriminations against the Berbers, despite their large-scale conversion to Islam. Ibn al-Habhab enslaved numerous Berber converts, including a constant flow of slave girls to Hisham. Berber troops were often deliberately exposed to more danger than their Arab counterparts during campaigns and sieges and unlike the Arabs, were denied salaries and relied solely on war booty. An attempt by a Berber military delegation led by Maysara al-Matghari to address these issues ended with Hisham's refusal to receive them. The Berbers' key allies among the local Islamic elite, the family of the Muslim conqueror of the Maghreb Musa ibn Nusayr, had been consistently persecuted by Hisham and his predecessors, due to their popularity and attempts to uphold the interests of the Berber mawali. Ibn Nusayr's mawali and Kharijite missionaries from Iraq stirred opposition to the Umayyads. Kharijite doctrine, which rejected dynastic rule and advocated for caliphs to be accountable to their subjects, appealed to the Berbers, who viewed the caliphs in Syria, their local agents and secluded garrisons as occupiers.

On 15 August 740, the Berber Miknasa and Barghawata tribes under Maysara's leadership, launched coordinated rebellions in the region of Tangiers, capturing the town and killing its governor. The attacks were carried out while Ibn al-Habhab's most effective forces under Habib ibn Abi Ubayda al-Fihri were on campaign in Byzantine Sicily. In November or December, a large Umayyad army sent by Ibn al-Habhab was devastated by the Berbers in the Battle of the Nobles; the Berbers proceeded to conquer much of Sous (the highlands of Morocco). The frontier moved to Tlemcen, where Umayyad forces under Habib's command held the line until Ibn al-Habhab was ousted in Kairouan (capital of Ifriqiya) in early 741. The crushing of Arab forces in North Africa undermined the caliph's position in neighboring al-Andalus (Iberian Peninsula) and in January 741, the old-established Arab military settlers and their Spanish mawali overthrew the governor Uqba ibn al-Hajjaj and replaced him with Abd al-Malik ibn Qatan al-Fihri. Although the new governor continued to formally acknowledge Hisham as caliph, al-Andalus effectively discarded caliphal rule, ignoring calls to send reinforcements to the Maghreb.

Hisham's response to his forces' spiralling losses in the western Caliphate was the deployment of a large Syrian army under the Damascene commander Kulthum ibn Iyad al-Qushayri in April–May 741. According to Khalid Yahya Blankinship, Hisham famously declared "By God, I will most certainly rage against them with an Arab rage, and I will indeed send against them an army whose beginning is where they are and whose end is where I am!". In October or November 741, Kulthum's forces met the Berbers, now led by Maysara's replacement Khalid ibn Humayd al-Zanati, at the Sebou river. In the ensuing Battle of Bagdoura, the Umayyad army was decisively defeated in a disaster comparable to Hisham's losses at the Defile and Ardabil. Much of the Umayyad forces were killed or captured, while the bulk of the Syrian survivors escaped to al-Andalus. The Berber victory sealed the Maghreb's permanent breakaway from the Umayyad Caliphate.

The shock of Kulthum's rout prompted Hisham to reassign one of his most seasoned Syrian generals, Hanzala ibn Safwan al-Kalbi, from his governorship in Egypt to stave off the Berber advance on Ifriqiya. By the time Hanzala arrived in January–February 742, Berber forces had been pushed from Kairouan to Tobna by the local Arab garrisons. Under their leader Abd al-Wahid ibn Yazid al-Hawwari, the Berbers regained the advantage when they successively defeated Arab forces in September and December 742 and then occupied the key port of Tunis. Significant troop losses led Hanzala to recruit widely among the residents of Kairouan and dig a trench around the city. In January 743, Hanzala's forces launched a sortie against Abd al-Wahid, routing his forces in Kairouan's environs at the Battle of al-Asnam. Hanzala's victory salvaged Umayyad rule in Ifriqiya but did not recover control of the Maghreb, which also left al-Andalus cut off from the rest of the caliphate.

==== Alid revolt of 740 ====
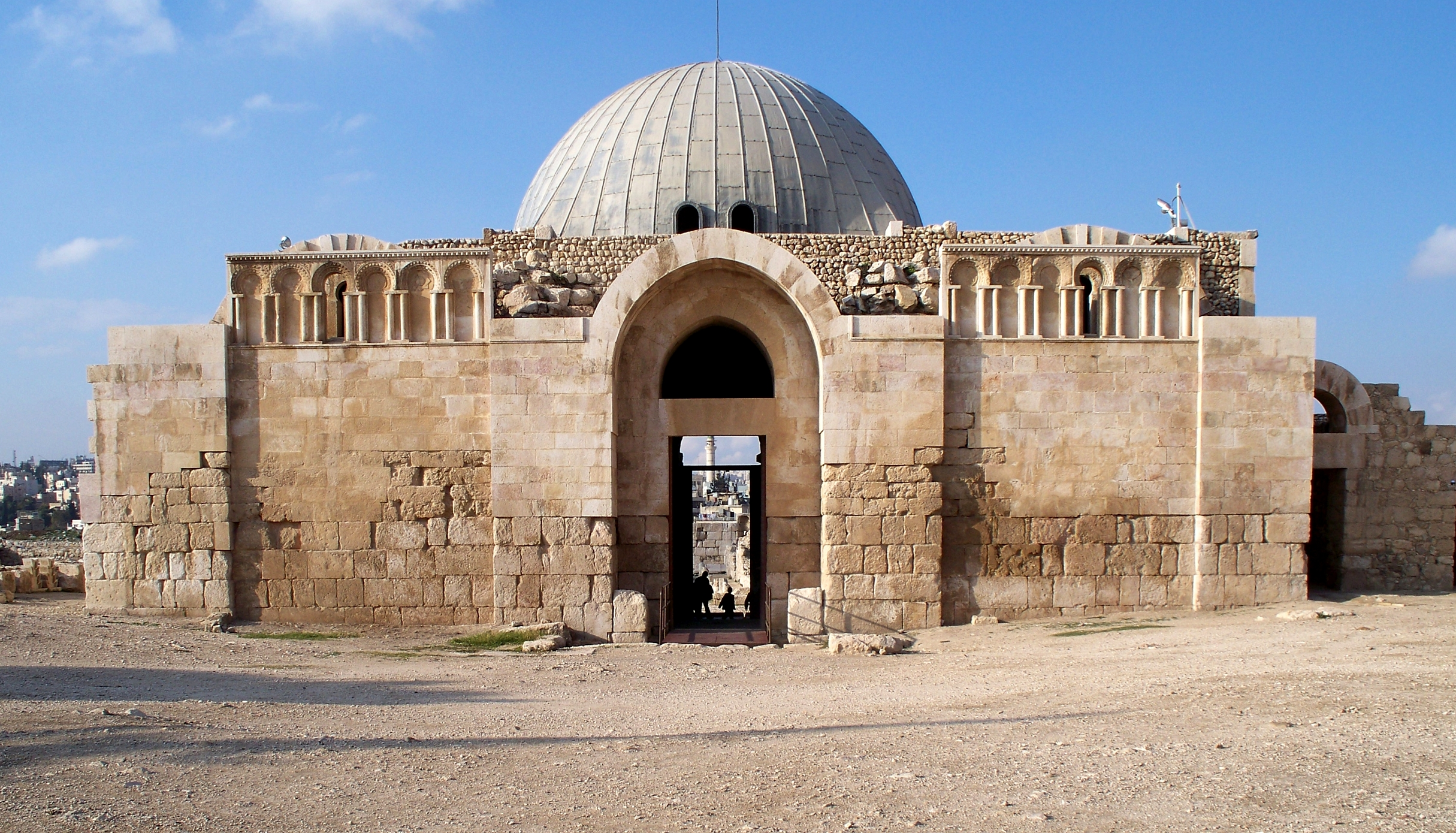
Reception hall of the Umayyad Palace in the Citadel of Amman, Jordan, built c. 735 to serve as the local governor's residence during Hisham's reign.

Hisham also faced a revolt by the followers of Zayd ibn Ali, grandson of Husayn ibn Ali, which was put down because of the lack of support it received. Although he had sympathies of many people He did not receive a substantial military support. Zayd was ordered to leave Kufa and though he appeared to set out for Mecca, he returned and dwelt secretly in Kufa moving from house to house and receiving the allegiance of many people. Yusuf ibn Umar al-Thaqafi, Iraq's governor, learned of the plot, commanded the people to gather at the great mosque, locked them inside and began a search for Zayd. Zayd with some troops fought his way to the mosque and called on people to come out. He then pushed back Yusuf's troops, but was felled by an arrow. Although his body was initially buried, the spot was pointed out and it was extracted, beheaded and the head sent to Hisham and later to Medina.

=== Death and succession ===
Hisham died on 6 February 743 (6 Rabiʽ al-Thani 125 AH). His son, Maslama, led the funeral prayers. Hisham had attempted to secure Maslama as his successor in place of Yazid II's son, al-Walid II. Hisham's initial attempts, after the Hajj of 735, to persuade al-Walid II to step down in favor of Maslama or, alternatively, to make Maslama al-Walid II's successor were rejected. Afterward, Hisham undermined al-Walid II by secretly gathering support for Maslama. The latter's nomination was supported by Maslama ibn Abd al-Malik and Hisham's maternal grandfather, Hisham ibn Isma'il, the latter's sons Ibrahim and Muhammad, as well as the sons of the tribal chief al-Qa'qa' ibn Khulayd, who were an influential family in northern Syria. Maslama's mother, Umm Hakim, also lobbied for him. Opposed to Maslama's proposed succession was Khalid al-Qasri, the governor of Iraq, to which Maslama responded by insulting him and his dead brother Asad. Maslama ibn Abd al-Malik's death in the late 730s was a major setback to Hisham's succession plans, as it represented the loss of the plan's key supporter in the Umayyad dynasty.

Al-Walid II acceded and immediately ordered his cousin, the veteran commander al-Abbas ibn al-Walid, to arrest Hisham's sons at Rusafa, near Palmyra, but expressly forbade that Maslama or his household be disturbed in deference to their old companionship and Maslama's defense of al-Walid II from Hisham.

== Assessment ==
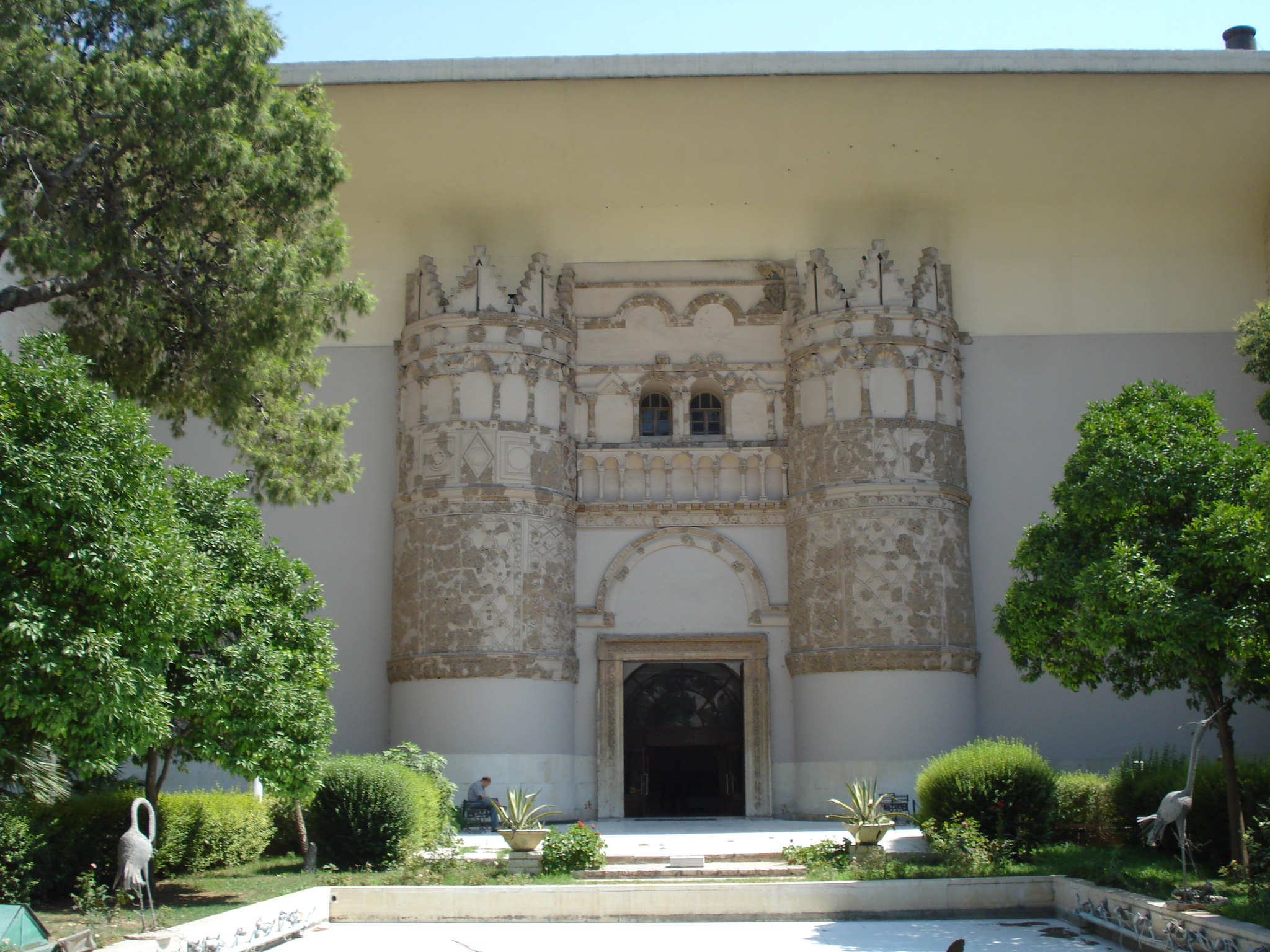
the gate of Qasr al-Hayr al-Gharbi dated to 727 (now part of the National Museum of Damascus)

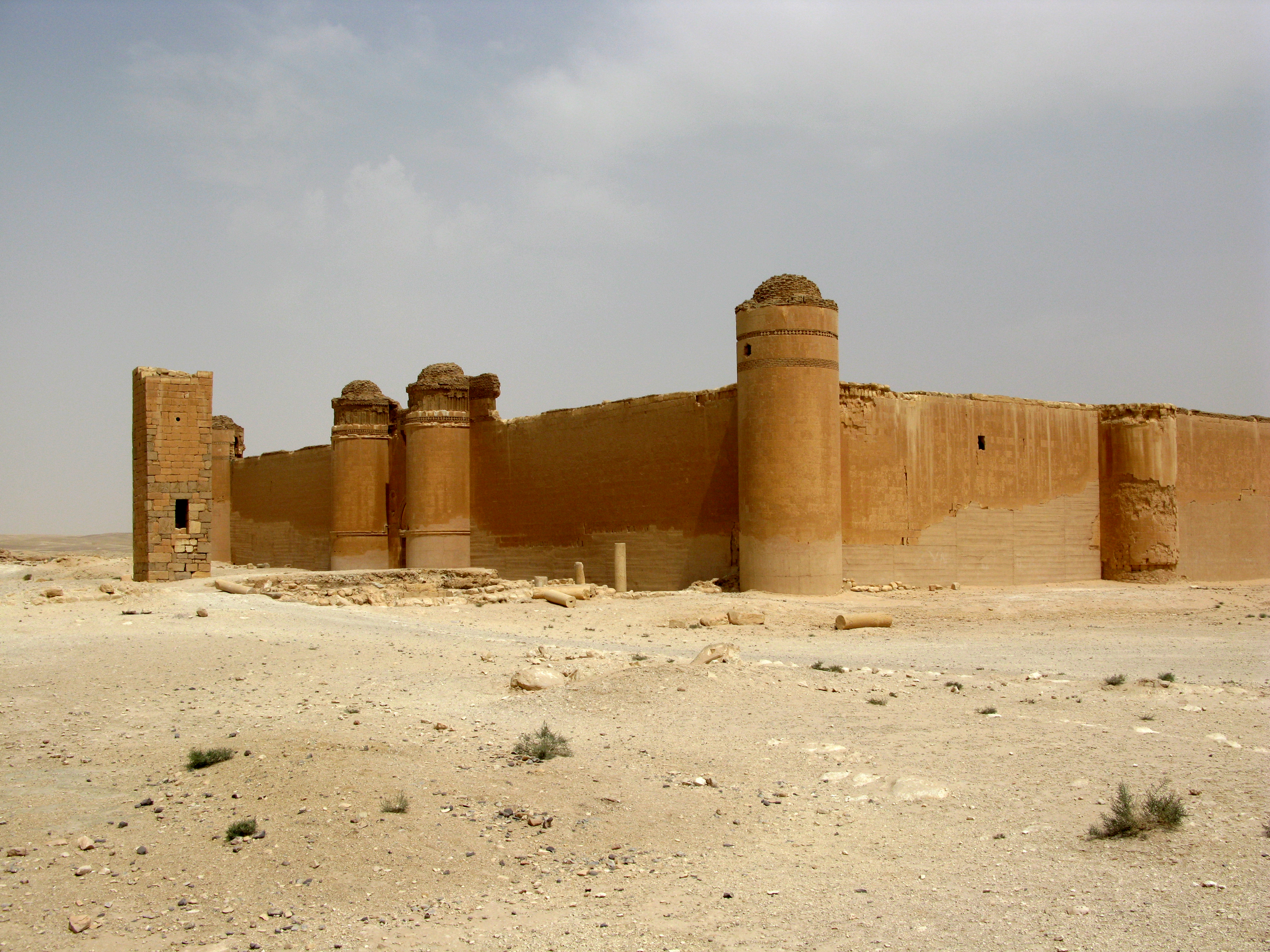
Qasr al-Hayr al-Sharqi in Syria, built by caliph Hisham, dated to 728

In general, Hisham is viewed by modern historians and the early Islamic tradition to have overseen a successful reign, on par with the similarly long reigns of the Umayyad Caliphate's founder Mu'awiya I (r. 661–680) and Abd al-Malik. In the summation of the historian Francesco Gabrieli, Hisham's rule "on the whole was glorious for the Arabs and fruitful in the development of Islamic faith and culture" and "marks the final period of prosperity and splendour of the Umayyad caliphate". By dint of his sobriety, austerity and work ethic, Hisham is held by most modern historians to have kept the Caliphate in good standing. They largely assign blame to his successor al-Walid II and longer standing internal factors, which Hisham could not resolve, for the Umayyad dynasty's unraveling in the few years after Hisham's death. Similarly, the Islamic tradition portrays Hisham as "a conscientious and efficient, if severe and tightfisted, administrator", according to Blankinship. In the view of the historian Hugh N. Kennedy, the Umayyad state "had never been as strong as it had been under Hisham only a decade before the final collapse" in 750.

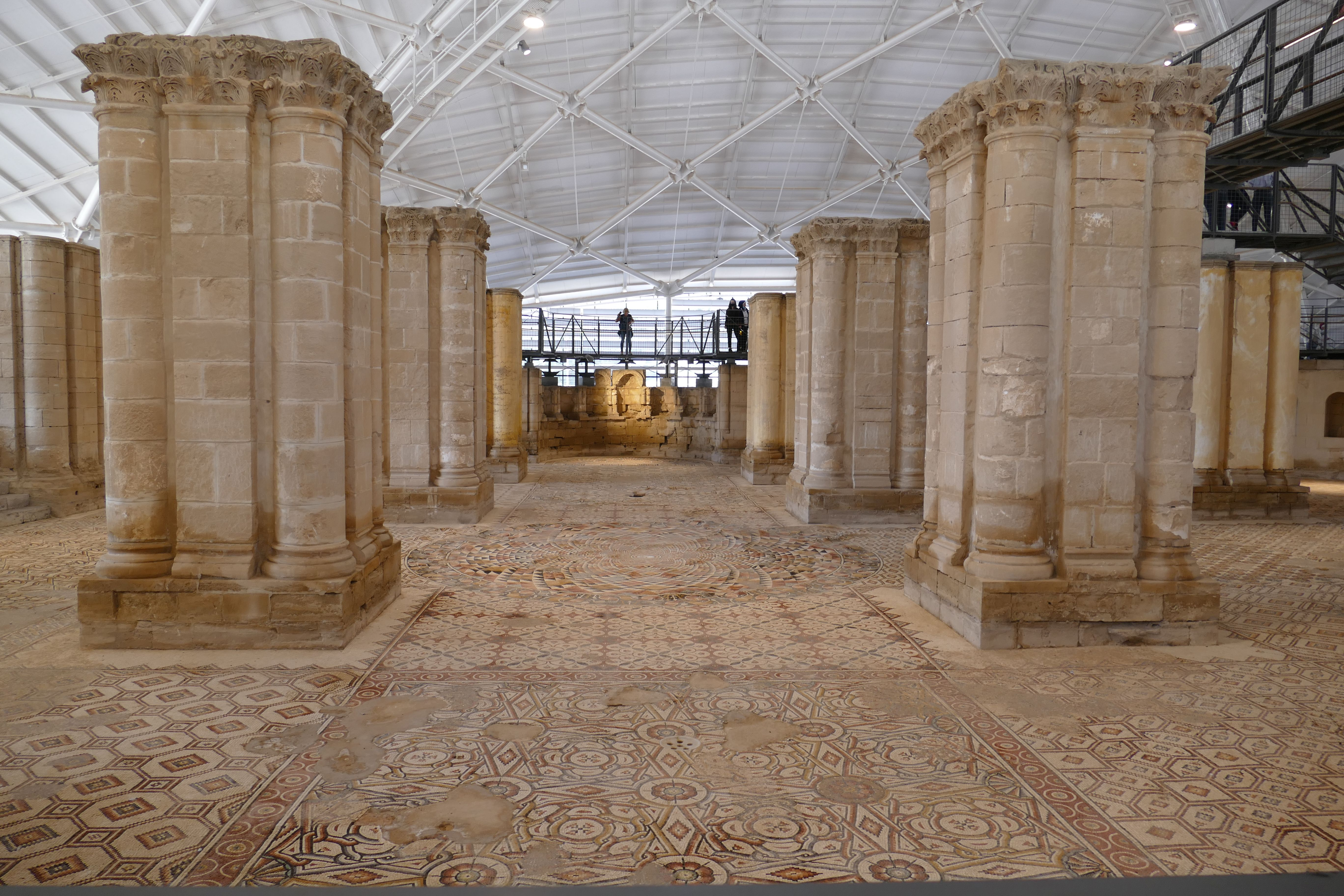
Hisham's palace (Khirbat al-Mafjar) in Jericho, Palestine

Blankinship, on the other hand, concludes that the military disasters of Hisham's reign brought about the Umayyad dynasty's demise. According to him, the state struggled to absorb the significant losses incurred by these defeats. Its treasury was dependent on war booty and it lacked efficient means to collect tax revenue from its subjects. An unprecedented economic crisis ensued, precipitating stringent taxation efforts and a substantial reduction in spending. This caused widespread discontent throughout the Caliphate, while also failing to remedy state finances. Meanwhile, the harshness and diminishing material returns from campaigning along the frontiers sapped the enthusiasm of the provincial garrisons and further increased Hisham's dependence on the Syrian army, the bedrock of the dynasty, to the chagrin of the locally established troops. As Syrian troops were dispatched both to fight on the frontiers and quell major rebellions throughout the Caliphate they suffered the brunt of these wars. The Syrians were mostly Yamani and their dispersal and heavy losses disrupted the factional balance upon which the Umayyad state depended in favor of the Qays/Mudar of the Jazira. The Qays/Mudar became the main component of the army under Marwan II (r. 744–750) and their rout by the Khurasani troops of the Abbasids marked the end of the Umayyad dynasty.

== Family ==
Hisham had five wives, all members of the Umayyad clan, from whom he had eight children. He had seven other children by umm walads (freed slave concubines). His favorite wife was Umm Hakim, the daughter of Yahya ibn al-Hakam, brother of Hisham's grandfather caliph Marwan I (r. 684–685). Her mother was Zaynab bint Abd al-Rahman, the granddaughter of a distinguished commander of the Islamic conquest of Syria, al-Harith ibn Hisham of the Banu Makhzum. Umm Hakim, like her mother, was well-known for her beauty and love for wine. She gave Hisham five sons, including Sulayman, Maslama, Yazid al-Afqam, and Mu'awiya.

Hisham was also married to Umm Uthman, a daughter of Sa'id ibn Khalid ibn Amr. The latter was a great-grandson of the third caliph Uthman (r. 644–656) and one of the wealthiest people of his day, who used to divide his time between Syria and Medina. Umm Uthman gave birth to Hisham's son Sa'id. Hisham was also married to Ruqayya bint Abd Allah ibn Amr, a great-granddaughter of Caliph Uthman. Another of his Umayyad wives was Abda, the daughter of Abd Allah ibn Yazid (granddaughter of Caliph Yazid I, r. 680–683). Abda was killed by the Abbasids in Homs in 750. Hisham's other sons were Muhammad, Abd Allah, Marwan, Abd al-Rahman and Quraysh. He had a daughter, A'isha, to whom he granted an estate at Ras Kayfa.

Descendants of Hisham ibn Abd al-Malik

Hisham (r. 724–743)
Abu Shakir Maslama	Yazid al-Afqam	Sulayman	Sa'id	Mu'awiya	A'isha	9 others
Sa'id al-Barmaki	Ubayd al-Salam	Uthman	Marwan	Aban	Abd al-Rahman I (r. 756–788)	Abdallah	al-Walid	others
al-Hakam	Ubaydallah	Descendants of Abd al-Rahman I	Ishaq	al-Mughira
Sulayman	Yahya	Mu'awiya
Muhammad	Aban	Abd al-Rahman	al-Mughira
Yazid	Mu'awiya	Mu'awiya	Abd al-Malik
al-Mundhir	Muhammad (Ibn al-Ahmar)	al-Mughira
Sa'id (Ibn al-Salim)	al-Hakam	Aban	Mu'awiya
al-Salim
Muhammad
Abd al-Rahman

Marwanid caliph
Umayyad emirs of al-Andalus

== Bibliography ==
- Ahmed, Asad Q. (2010). The Religious Elite of the Early Islamic Ḥijāz: Five Prosopographical Case Studies. Oxford: University of Oxford Linacre College Unit for Prosopographical Research. ISBN 978-1-900934-13-8.
- Bessard, Fanny (2020). Caliphs and Merchants: Cities and Economies of Power in the Near East (700-950). Oxford University Press. ISBN 978-0-19-259783-0.
- Blankinship, Khalid Yahya, ed. (1989). The History of al-Ṭabarī, Volume XXV: The End of Expansion: The Caliphate of Hishām, A.D. 724–738/A.H. 105–120. SUNY Series in Near Eastern Studies. Albany, New York: State University of New York Press. ISBN 978-0-88706-569-9.
- Blankinship, Khalid Yahya (1994). The End of the Jihâd State: The Reign of Hishām ibn ʻAbd al-Malik and the Collapse of the Umayyads. Albany, New York: State University of New York Press. ISBN 978-0-7914-1827-7.
- Bloom, Jonathan M.; Blair, Sheila S., eds. (2009). "Amman". The Grove Encyclopedia of Islamic Art and Architecture. Vol. 1. Oxford University Press. ISBN 978-0-19530-991-1.
- Bosworth, C. Edmund (1994). "Abū Ḥafṣ 'Umar al-Kirmānī and the Rise of the Barmakids". Bulletin of the School of Oriental and African Studies. 57 (2): 268–282. doi:10.1017/S0041977X0002485X. JSTOR 620573. S2CID 162613546.
- Brown, Daniel W. (1996). Rethinking Traditions in Modern Islamic Thought. Cambridge University Press. ISBN 0521570778.
- Ettinghausen, Richard (1977). Arab painting. New York: Rizzoli International Publications. ISBN 978-0-8478-0081-0.
- Ettinghausen, Richard; Grabar, Oleg; Jenkins, Marilyn (2003). Islamic Art and Architecture 650–1250 (2nd ed.). Yale University Press. ISBN 9780300088694.
- Gabrieli, F. (1971). "Hishām". In Lewis, B.; Ménage, V. L.; Pellat, Ch. & Schacht, J. (eds.). The Encyclopaedia of Islam, Second Edition. Volume III: H–Iram. Leiden: E. J. Brill. pp. 493–495. OCLC 495469525.
- Gordon, Matthew S.; Robinson, Chase F.; Rowson, Everett K.; Fishbein, Michael (2018). The Works of Ibn Wāḍiḥ al-Yaʿqūbī (Volume 3): An English Translation. Leiden: Brill. ISBN 978-90-04-35621-4.
- Hawting, Gerald R. (2000). The First Dynasty of Islam: The Umayyad Caliphate AD 661–750 (Second ed.). London and New York: Routledge. ISBN 0-415-24072-7.
- Hillenbrand, Carole, ed. (1989). The History of al-Ṭabarī, Volume XXVI: The Waning of the Umayyad Caliphate: Prelude to Revolution, A.D. 738–744/A.H. 121–126. SUNY Series in Near Eastern Studies. Albany, New York: State University of New York Press. ISBN 978-0-88706-810-2.
- Hinds, M. (1991). "Makhzum". In Bosworth, C. E.; van Donzel, E. & Pellat, Ch. (eds.). The Encyclopaedia of Islam, Second Edition. Volume VI: Mahk–Mid. Leiden: E. J. Brill. pp. 137–140. ISBN 978-90-04-08112-3.
- Hoyland, Robert G. (2015). In God's Path: The Arab Conquests and the Creation of an Islamic Empire. New York: Oxford University Press. ISBN 978-0-19-991636-8.
- Intagliata, Emanuele E. (2018) [1950]. Palmyra after Zenobia AD 273-750: An Archaeological and Historical Reappraisal. Oxford: Oxbow Books. ISBN 978-1-78570-942-5.
- Judd, Steven (July–September 2008). "Reinterpreting al-Walīd b. Yazīd". Journal of the American Oriental Society. 128 (3): 439–458. JSTOR 25608405.
- Kennedy, Hugh (2004) [1986]. The Prophet and the Age of the Caliphates: The Islamic Near East from the 6th to the 11th Century (Second ed.). Harlow: Longman. ISBN 978-0-582-40525-7.
- Khleifat, Awad Mohammad (May 1973). The Caliphate of Hishām b. ʿAbd al-Malik (105–125/724–743) with Special Reference to Internal Problems (PhD). University of London, School of Oriental and African Studies.
- Kilpatrick, Hilary (2003). Making the Great Book of Songs: Compilation and the Author's Craft in Abū l-Faraj al-Iṣbahānī's Kitāb al-Aghānī. London: Routledge. ISBN 9780700717019. OCLC 50810677.
- Marsham, Andrew (2009). The Rituals of Islamic Monarchy: Accession and Succession in the First Muslim Empire. Edinburgh: Edinburgh University Press. ISBN 978-0-7486-2512-3.
- Marsham, Andrew (2022). "Kinship, Dynasty, and the Umayyads". The Historian of Islam at Work: Essays in Honor of Hugh N. Kennedy. Leiden: Brill. pp. 12–45. ISBN 978-90-04-52523-8.
- Marsham, Andrew (2024). The Umayyad Empire. Edinburgh: Edinburgh University Press. ISBN 978-0-7486-4301-1.
- Powers, David S., ed. (1989). The History of al-Ṭabarī, Volume XXIV: The Empire in Transition: The Caliphates of Sulaymān, ʿUmar, and Yazīd, A.D. 715–724/A.H. 96–105. SUNY Series in Near Eastern Studies. Albany, New York: State University of New York Press. ISBN 978-0-7914-0072-2.
- Müller-Wiener, Martina (2017). "Processes of Regionalisation in Late Antique and Early Islamic in Bilād al-Shām and al-Jazīra: Material Culture and the Organisation of Space". In Müller-Wiener, Martina; Korn, Lorenz (eds.). Central Periphery? Art, Culture and History of the Medieval Jazira (Northern Mesopotamia, 8th–15th Centuries). Wiesbaden: Reichert. pp. 37–70. ISBN 978-3-9549-0878-3.
- Robinson, Chase F. (2010). "The Violence of the Abbasid Revolution". In Suleiman, Yasir (ed.). Living Islamic History: Studies in Honour of Professor Carole Hillenbrand. Edinburgh: Edinburgh University Press. pp. 226–251. ISBN 978-0-7486-3738-6.
- Robinson, Majied (2020). Marriage in the Tribe of Muhammad: A Statistical Study of Early Arabic Genealogical Literature. Berlin: Walter de Gruyter. ISBN 9783110624168.
- Webb, Peter (2025). "Power and Money on the Ḥajj: Connections between Caliphate and Pilgrimage in Early Islam". In Kennedy, Hugh; Bessard, Fanny (eds.). Land and Trade in Early Islam: The Economy of the Islamic Middle East 750–1050 CE. Oxford University Press. pp. 100–139. ISBN 978-0-19-260817-8.
- Wellhausen, Julius (1927). The Arab Kingdom and Its Fall. Translated by Margaret Graham Weir. Calcutta: University of Calcutta.

Hisham ibn Abd al-Malik Umayyad dynasty Born: 691 Died: 6 February 743
Preceded by Yazid II	Caliph of Islam; Umayyad Caliph; 26 January 724 – 6 February 743	Succeeded by Al-Walid II
