= Al-Hurr ibn Yusuf =

Umayyad statesman, official and governor

Al-Hurr ibn Yusuf al-Qurashi al-Umawi الحر بن يوسف القرشي الأموي

Umayyad governor of Egypt
- In office 724–727
- Monarch: Hisham
- Preceded by: Muhammad ibn Abd al-Malik
- Succeeded by: Hafs ibn al-Walid ibn Yusuf al-Hadrami

Umayyad governor of Mosul
- In office 727–731
- Monarch: Hisham
- Preceded by: Marwan ibn Muhammad ibn Marwan
- Succeeded by: Yahya ibn al-Hurr (732/33)

Personal details
- Died: 731 Mosul, Umayyad Caliphate
- Children: Yahya ibn al-Hurr; Ubaydallah ibn al-Hurr; Salama ibn al-Hurr
- Parent: Yusuf ibn Yahya ibn al-Hakam (father)
- Relatives: Amina bint Yahya (aunt); Umm Hakim ibn Yahya (aunt); Yahya ibn al-Hakam (grand father)

Al-Ḥurr ibn Yūsuf al-Qurashī al-Umawī (Arabic: الحر بن يوسف القرشي الأموي) (died 731) was an early eighth century Umayyad statesman. During the caliphate of his relative Hisham (r. 724–743) he served as a governor of Egypt (724–727) and was afterwards placed in charge of Mosul, where he remained until his death. He is known for having undertaken a number of large-scale building projects in Mosul, including some of the city's most significant developments completed during the Marwanid period.

== Career ==
=== Family ===
Al-Hurr was descended from a collateral branch of the Umayyad dynasty, his grandfather Yahya ibn al-Hakam having been the brother of the fourth Umayyad caliph Marwan ibn al-Hakam (r. 684–685). His father, Yusuf, had served as a governor of Mosul during the reign of Abd al-Malik ibn Marwan (r. 685–705). One of al-Hurr's aunts, Amina bint Yahya, was married to Hisham ibn Abd al-Malik, while another aunt (or, according to the historian al-Azdi, sister), Umm Hakim, was similarly wed to the same caliph and later proved instrumental in procuring al-Hurr's appointment to Mosul.

Among al-Hurr's children, Yahya ibn al-Hurr briefly served as acting governor of Mosul following his father's death and remained in ownership of properties in the region until he was executed by Isma'il ibn Ali in the aftermath of the Abbasid Revolution. Another son, Ubaydallah, reportedly joined Abdallah ibn Marwan ibn Muhammad in fleeing to Nubia after the death of the last Umayyad caliph Marwan II in 750. Salama ibn al-Hurr became a poet and took up residence among the Bedouins in the Arabian desert; he was later killed by the Kharijite rebel al-Dahhak ibn Qays al-Shaybani.

Descendants of Abu al-As ibn Umayya

Umayya
Abu al-As
Affan	al-Hakam	Safiyya (wife of Abu Sufyan)	al-Mughira
Uthman (r. 644–656)	Marwan I (r. 684–685)	Uthman al-Azraq	al-Harith	Abd al-Rahman	Yahya	Habib	Aban	Mu'awiya
Uthmanids	Marwanids	Abd al-Malik	Abd al-Aziz	Abd al-Wahid	Abdallah	Yusuf	al-Hakam	Umm Hakim (wife of Hisham)	Amina (wife of Hisham)	Umm Abd Allah (wife of Umar ibn al-Walid)	Umm Aban (wife of Sulayman)	A'isha (wife of Marwan I)
Isma'il	Khalid	Sa'id (Khudayna)	Abd Allah	Abd al-Malik	al-Hurr	Ayyub
Salama	Ubaydallah	Yahya	al-Hakam
Safwan
Muhammad
Abd al-Rahman

Horizontal dashed line indicates marriage
Vertical dashed line indicates skipped generation(s)
Descendants of third Rashidun caliph Uthman (r. 644–656)
Marwanid caliphs
Ruling dynasty of Umayyad Caliphate, 684–750

=== Governor of Egypt ===
In 724 al-Hurr was appointed by Hisham as governor of Egypt as a replacement for his second cousin Muhammad ibn Abd al-Malik ibn Marwan. Arriving in Egypt in early May, he assumed control over matters of security, but the province's finances were separately managed by Ubaydallah ibn al-Habhab.

During al-Hurr's governorship, Ibn al-Habhab attempted to impose additional taxes on the populace, adding at least one carat (1/24th) to each dinar levy. This move caused the outbreak of a widespread revolt in Lower Egypt in 725–726, with the residents of Natu, Tumayy, Qurbayt, Turabiyya, and the eastern Hawf rising in up an event later described by the historian Muhammad ibn Yusuf al-Kindi as the first Coptic rebellion against the Arabs. In response, al-Hurr relocated to Damietta in order to lead operations against the rebels, and after three months of inflicting heavy casualties on the insurgents he succeeded in restoring order in the province.

While in Egypt al-Hurr also worked with Hisham to resettle a group of Syrian Arabs to the eastern Delta and built a covered market street on new land created from a recession of the Nile. In 726 he briefly departed the province to meet with the caliph in Syria, leaving his prefect of police Hafs ibn al-Walid ibn Yusuf al-Hadrami to manage affairs during his absence. He remained as governor until 727, when a dispute between him and Ibn al-Habhab caused the latter to write a letter of complaint to the caliph; in response al-Hurr agreed to step down from office and was replaced by Hafs.

=== Governor of Mosul ===
A short time after his dismissal from Egypt, al-Hurr received an appointment from Hisham for the governorship of Mosul. Al-Azdi dates the start of al-Hurr's governorship to 724–725, but as this overlaps with his tenure in Egypt modern historians instead place his appointment in 727 or later.

While in Mosul al-Hurr initiated a building program for several major private and public developments, putting him in line with a long Marwanid tradition of investing in improvement projects for the city. Among these were the construction of a new palace located near the city markets which al-Hurr intended to have serve as the governor's residence. The large complex, called al-Manqusha or the Decorated Palace, was so-named for its ornamentation made up of teak, alabaster, and other materials. The palace at least partially survived into the 13th century, when it was reported by the chronicler Ali ibn al-Athir as being in a ruined state.

The largest single development begun by al-Hurr was for the cutting of a canal that ran from the Tigris to the center of Mosul, an undertaking characterized by Chase F. Robinson as "the most impressive building project" completed in the city in the early Marwanid period. The canal, which was known as the Uncovered River (al-nahr al-makshuf), was laid out to increase the accessibility of drinking water for the city, and thousands of laborers and planners were brought in to participate in its excavation. The cost of the project was enormous and paying for it required the use of the entirety of the provincial revenues, with the result that no money was forwarded to the central government during its construction. Work on the canal continued after al-Hurr's death and the project was finally completed in 738–739.

Al-Hurr died in 731 and was buried in Mosul. Upon his death his son Yahya inherited his palace as well as numerous houses, inns, and estates, and his family retained ownership of extensive properties in the Mosul area for the duration of the Umayyad era.

== Notes ==
Preceded by Muhammad ibn Abd al-Malik ibn Marwan	Governor of Egypt; 724–727	Succeeded by Hafs ibn al-Walid ibn Yusuf al-Hadrami
