= Yahya ibn al-Hakam =

7th-century Umayyad prince and statesman

Governor of Medina
- In office 694–695
- Monarch: Abd al-Malik
- Preceded by: Al-Hajjaj ibn Yusuf

Governor of Palestine
- In office 685–694
- Monarch: Abd al-Malik

Personal details
- Died: Before 700
- Spouses: Umm al-Qasim al-Sughra bint Abd al-Rahman ibn Awf; Zaynab bint Abd al-Rahman ibn al-Harith
- Relations: Umayyad (paternal tribe); Murra (maternal tribe)
- Children: al-Hakam; Yusuf; Amina; Umm Hakim
- Parent(s): Al-Hakam ibn Abi al-As; Mulayka bint Awfa

Yahya ibn al-Hakam ibn Abi al-As (Arabic: يَحْيَى بْنِ الْحَكَم بْنِ أَبِي الْعَاص, romanized: Yaḥyā ibn al-Ḥakam ibn Abī al-ʿĀṣ; died before 700) was an Umayyad statesman during the caliphate of his nephew, Abd al-Malik (r. 685–705). He fought against Caliph Ali (r. 656–661) at the Battle of the Camel and later moved to Damascus where he was a courtier of the Umayyad caliphs Mu'awiya I (r. 661–680) and Yazid I (r. 680–683). He was appointed governor of Palestine by Abd al-Malik and is credited in an inscription for building part of a road connecting Damascus to Jerusalem in 692. He served as governor of Medina for a year in 694/95 and afterward led a series of expeditions against the Byzantine Empire along the northern frontier of Syria.

== Life ==
Yahya was a son of al-Hakam ibn Abi al-As and a younger half-brother of Caliph Marwan I (r. 684–685). His mother, Mulayka bint Awfa, hailed from the Banu Murra tribe of Ghatafan. He fought alongside Marwan and their brother Abd al-Rahman and other senior leaders of the Quraysh against Caliph Ali (r. 656–661) at the Battle of the Camel in 656. Ali was victorious and Yahya, wounded, found safety with a member of the large Banu Tamim tribe in Basra. This tribesman escorted him to the headquarters of his distant cousin, the governor of Syria, Mu'awiya ibn Abi Sufyan, in Damascus. He stayed in the city through the course of Mu'awiya's caliphate (r. 661–680) and that of his son and successor, Yazid I (r. 680–683). Yahya publicly condemned the slaying of Ali's son and the Islamic prophet Muhammad's grandson, Husayn, by Yazid's army at the Battle of Karbala in 680.

At some point between 685 and 694, Yahya's nephew, the caliph Abd al-Malik ibn Marwan (r. 685–705), appointed him the governor of Palestine. Yahya was credited in an inscription on a milestone found near Samakh for supervising the construction of a road through the Fiq pass in the Golan Heights on behalf of Abd al-Malik. The inscription dates to May/June 692, making it the oldest known Islamic inscription about the foundation of a road.

In 694/95, Yahya was appointed governor of Medina. He was recalled to Damascus in the following year, during which he led a summer campaign against the Byzantines in the general vicinity of Malatya and al-Massisa. In 697/98, he led a campaign against the Byzantine fortress at Marj al-Shahm. This may have occurred in 698/699. Yahya died before 700. His tombstone was found in Katzrin in the Golan Heights. The epitaph, in Kufic Arabic script, reads "May my Lord have mercy on Yahya ibn al-Hakam and forgive him".

== Family and descendants ==
One of Yahya's wives during his governorship of Medina was Umm al-Qasim al-Sughra, a daughter of a leading companion of Muhammad, Abd al-Rahman ibn Awf. Yahya's son al-Hakam was married to Umm Yahya bint Muhammad, a granddaughter of Urwa ibn al-Zubayr. Another son of Yahya, Yusuf, served as governor of Mosul toward the end of Abd al-Malik's reign, and Yusuf's son al-Hurr and grandson Yahya ibn al-Hurr each served terms in the province in 727–732 and 732, respectively.

Yahya's daughter, Amina, was married to Abd al-Malik's son, the future caliph Hisham. Afterward, another daughter, Umm Hakim, who, like her mother Zaynab bint Abd al-Rahman, was well-known for her beauty and love of wine, married Hisham, with whom she had five sons, including Sulayman, Maslama, Yazid al-Afqam, and Mu'awiya. The latter's son, Abd al-Rahman I, founded the Umayyad Emirate of Córdoba in modern-day Spain in 756. A patrilineal ninth-generation descendant of Yahya, (Note: Abu Muhammad al-Qurtubi's descent from Yahya was traced as follows: Abd al-Rahman ibn Muhammad ibn Ahmad ibn Muhammad ibn Safwan ibn Abdallah ibn al-Hakam ibn Ayyub ibn Yusuf ibn Yahya.) Abu Muhammad Abd al-Rahman ibn Muhammad al-Qurtubi, was a noted Muslim traditionist, ascetic and student of Baqi ibn Makhlad from Córdoba. In his later life, Abd al-Rahman emigrated to Abbasid Iraq, studying in Baghdad and Basra where he died.

Descendants of Abu al-As ibn Umayya

Umayya
Abu al-As
Affan	al-Hakam	Safiyya (wife of Abu Sufyan)	al-Mughira
Uthman (r. 644–656)	Marwan I (r. 684–685)	Uthman al-Azraq	al-Harith	Abd al-Rahman	Umm al-Banin (wife of Sa'id ibn al-As)	Yahya	Habib	Aban	Mu'awiya
Uthmanids	Marwanids	Abd al-Malik	Abd al-Aziz	Abd al-Wahid	Abdallah	Abu Bakr (son-in-law of Marwan I)	Yusuf	al-Hakam	Umm Hakim (wife of Hisham)	Amina (wife of Hisham)	Umm Abd Allah (wife of Umar ibn al-Walid)	Umm Aban (wife of Sulayman)	A'isha (wife of Marwan I)
Isma'il	Khalid	Sa'id (Khudayna)	Abd Allah	Abd al-Malik	al-Hurr	Ayyub
Salama	Ubaydallah	Yahya	al-Hakam
Safwan
Muhammad
Abd al-Rahman

Horizontal dashed line indicates marriage
Vertical dashed line indicates skipped generation(s)
Descendants of third Rashidun caliph Uthman (r. 644–656)
Marwanid caliphs
Ruling dynasty of Umayyad Caliphate, 684–750

== Bibliography ==
- Ahmed, Asad Q. (2011). The Religious Elite of the Early Islamic Ḥijāz: Five Prosopographical Case Studies. Oxford: University of Oxford Linacre College Unit for Prosopographical Research. ISBN 978-1-900934-13-8.
- Caetani, Leone; Gabrieli, Giuseppe (1915). Onomasticon Arabicum, Volume 2, A'abil—Abdallah. Rome: Casa Editrice Italiana.
- Crone, Patricia (1980). Slaves on Horses: The Evolution of the Islamic Polity (1980 ed.). Cambridge: Cambridge University Press. ISBN 978-0521229616.
- Gil, Moshe (1997) [1983]. A History of Palestine, 634–1099. Translated by Ethel Broido. Cambridge: Cambridge University Press. ISBN 0-521-59984-9.
- Blankinship, Khalid Yahya, ed. (1989). The History of al-Ṭabarī, Volume XXV: The End of Expansion: The Caliphate of Hishām, A.D. 724–738/A.H. 105–120. SUNY Series in Near Eastern Studies. Albany, New York: State University of New York Press. ISBN 978-0-88706-569-9.
- Hillenbrand, Carole, ed. (1989). The History of al-Ṭabarī, Volume XXVI: The Waning of the Umayyad Caliphate: Prelude to Revolution, A.D. 738–744/A.H. 121–126. SUNY Series in Near Eastern Studies. Albany, New York: State University of New York Press. ISBN 978-0-88706-810-2.
- Intagliata, Emanuele E. (2018) [1950]. Palmyra after Zenobia AD 273-750: An Archaeological and Historical Reappraisal. Oxford: Oxbow Books. ISBN 978-1-78570-942-5.
- Judd, Steven (July–September 2008). "Reinterpreting al-Walīd b. Yazīd". Journal of the American Oriental Society. 128 (3): 439–458. JSTOR 25608405.
- Robinson, Chase F. (2004). Empire and Elites after the Muslim Conquest: The Transformation of Northern Mesopotamia. Cambridge University Press. ISBN 0-511-03072-X.
- Rowson, Everett K., ed. (1989). The History of al-Ṭabarī, Volume XXII: The Marwānid Restoration: The Caliphate of ʿAbd al-Malik, A.D. 693–701/A.H. 74–81. SUNY Series in Near Eastern Studies. Albany, New York: State University of New York Press. ISBN 978-0-88706-975-8.
- Madelung, Wilferd (1997). The Succession to Muhammad: A Study of the Early Caliphate. Cambridge: Cambridge University Press. ISBN 0-521-56181-7.
- "Museum Notes". Museum Notes. 19. New York: American Numismatic Society: 178, note 53. 1974.
- Sharon, Moshe (June 1966). "An Arabic Inscription from the Time of the Caliph 'Abd al-Malik". Bulletin of the School of Oriental and African Studies. 29 (2): 367–372. doi:10.1017/S0041977X00058900.
- Sharon, Moshe (2004). Corpus Inscriptionum Arabicarum Palaestinae (CIAP): D-F. Volume Three. Leiden and Boston: Brill. ISBN 90-04-13197-3.
- Uzquiza Bartolomé, Aránzazu (1994). "Otros Linajes Omeyas en al-Andalus" [Other Umayyad Lineages in al-Andalus]. In Marín, Manuela (ed.). Estudios onomástico-biográficos de Al-Andalus: VI [Onomastic-biographies of al-Andalus: VI] (in Spanish). Madrid: Consejo Superior de Investigaciones Científicas. pp. 445–462. ISBN 84-00-07415-7.
- Marsham, Andrew (2022). "Kinship, Dynasty, and the Umayyads". The Historian of Islam at Work: Essays in Honor of Hugh N. Kennedy. Leiden: Brill. pp. 12–45. ISBN 978-90-04-52523-8.

Preceded by Al-Hajjaj ibn Yusuf	Governor of Medina; 694–695	Succeeded by Aban ibn Uthman ibn Affan
