= Abu al-As ibn Umayya =

6th-century Arab chief of Banu Umayya clan (Quraysh)

Personal details
- Born: Mecca, Arabia
- Died: Mecca, Arabia
- Spouses: Amina bint Abd al-Uzza ibn Hurthan; Ruqayya bint al-Harith ibn Ubayd
- Children: Affan; al-Hakam; Safiyya; al-Mughira
- Parent(s): Umayya ibn Abd Shams (father); Amina bint Aban ibn Kulayb

Abū al-ʿĀṣ ibn Umayya ibn Abd Shams (Arabic: أبو العاص بن أمية) was a son of the eponymous progenitor of the Umayyad clan, Umayya ibn Abd Shams, and the paternal ancestor of both caliph Uthman ibn Affan (r. 644–656) and Marwan ibn al-Hakam (r. 684–685) and the latter's Marwanid line of Umayyad caliphs (r. 684–750).

== Family ==
Abu al-As was a son of Umayya ibn Abd Shams of the Quraysh tribe of Mecca. His mother, Amina bint Aban ibn Kulayb, hailed from the Bedouin tribe of Banu Amir ibn Sa'sa'. Abu al-As was married to three women of the Quraysh: Amina bint Abd al-Uzza ibn Hurthan of the Banu Adi clan, Ruqayya bint al-Harith ibn Ubayd of the Banu Makhzum clan, and Safiyya bint Rabi'a ibn Abd Shams of the Banu Abd Shams clan, to which Abu al-As also belonged. He also married a woman of the Thaqif tribe of Ta'if, Arwa bint Asid ibn Ilaj ibn Abi Salama. From his marriages, Abu al-As had at least thirteen children. (Note: His children by Amina were sons Affan, Afif, Awf and Uthman and daughters Safiyya, Umm Habib and Umm Habiba (or Ramla) and his children by Ruqayya were al-Hakam, al-Mughira, and Rayhana. From his wife Safiyya, he had a daughter, Lubaba, and from Arwa he had another daughter, Khalida. He had a fifth wife or concubine whose name is unknown, with whom he had his son Sa'id.)

The better known of his children were his son Affan and daughter Safiyya from his wife Amina. Affan was the father of the third caliph, Uthman (r. 644–656), and Safiyya was the wife of the preeminent leader of the Abd Shams/Umayya clan, Abu Sufyan, and the mother of Ramla, one of the wives of the prophet Muhammad. His other prominent son, by his wife Ruqayya, was al-Hakam, the father of the Umayyad caliph Marwan I (r. 684–685) and ancestor of the Marwanid line of caliphs who ruled until 750.

== Family trees ==
Quraysh tribe
Waqida bint Amr	Abd Manaf ibn Qusayy	Ātikah bint Murrah
Nawfal	‘Abd Shams	Barra	Hala	Muṭṭalib	Hashim	Salma bint Amr
Umayya	ʿAbd al-Muṭṭalib
Harb	Abū al-ʿĀs	ʿĀmina	ʿAbdallāh	Hamza	Abu Ṭālib	al-Zubayr	al-ʿAbbās	Abū Lahab
Abu Sufyān	al-Ḥakam	ʿAffān	MUHAMMAD (Family tree)	Khadija bint Khuwaylid	ʿAlī (Family tree)	Khawlah bint Ja'far	Ibn Abbas
Muʿāwiya I	Marwān I	ʿUthmān	Ruqayya	Fatimah	Muhammad ibn al-Hanafiyyah	ʿAli
Sufyanids	Marwanids	al-Ḥasan	al-Ḥusayn (Family tree)	Abu Hasim (Imām of al-Mukhtār and Hashimiyya)	Muhammad "al-Imām" (Abbasids)
Ibrāhim "al-Imām"	al-Saffāḥ	al-Mansur

Descendants of Abu al-As ibn Umayya

Umayya
Abu al-As
Affan	al-Hakam	Safiyya (wife of Abu Sufyan)	al-Mughira
Uthman (r. 644–656)	Marwan I (r. 684–685)	Uthman al-Azraq	al-Harith	Abd al-Rahman	Umm al-Banin (wife of Sa'id ibn al-As)	Yahya	Habib	Aban	Mu'awiya
Uthmanids	Marwanids	Abd al-Malik	Abd al-Aziz	Abd al-Wahid	Abdallah	Abu Bakr (son-in-law of Marwan I)	Yusuf	al-Hakam	Umm Hakim (wife of Hisham)	Amina (wife of Hisham)	Umm Abd Allah (wife of Umar ibn al-Walid)	Umm Aban (wife of Sulayman)	A'isha (wife of Marwan I)
Isma'il	Khalid	Sa'id (Khudayna)	Abd Allah	Abd al-Malik	al-Hurr	Ayyub
Salama	Ubaydallah	Yahya	al-Hakam
Safwan
Muhammad
Abd al-Rahman

Horizontal dashed line indicates marriage
Vertical dashed line indicates skipped generation(s)
Descendants of third Rashidun caliph Uthman (r. 644–656)
Marwanid caliphs
Ruling dynasty of Umayyad Caliphate, 684–750

== Sources ==
- Caskel, Werner (1966). Ğamharat an-nasab: Das genealogische Werk des His̆ām ibn Muḥammad al-Kalbī, Band II [Jamharat al-nasab: The Geneaological Work of Hishām ibn Muḥammad al-Kalbī, Volume II] (in German). Leiden: Brill. OCLC 490272940.
- Marsham, Andrew (2022). "Kinship, Dynasty, and the Umayyads". The Historian of Islam at Work: Essays in Honor of Hugh N. Kennedy. Leiden: Brill. pp. 12–45. ISBN 978-90-04-52523-8.
