= Abd al-Rahman ibn al-Hakam ibn Abi al-As =

Abu Mutarrif Abd al-Raḥmān ibn al-Ḥakam ibn Abī al-Āṣ (fl. 656 – c. 684) was an Umayyad prince and poet.

== Life ==
Abd al-Rahman was a son of al-Hakam ibn Abi al-As, a member of the Banu Umayya (Umayyad) family of the Quraysh, and his wife Amina bint Alqama ibn Safwan, from the Kinana tribe, and thus a full brother to future Umayyad caliph Marwan I (r. 684–685). Abd al-Rahman was married to Umm Qasim, a daughter of the Umayyad nobleman, Abdallah ibn Khalid ibn Asid.

Abd al-Rahman was a poet and not politically active like Marwan and other relatives, with whom he was at times allied and opposed. Several of his verses are recorded in the medieval Arabic sources, including the 10th-century Kitab al-aghani (Book of Songs). The latter's author, Abu al-Faraj al-Isfahani, viewed him as a poet of little significance, while the 11th-century historian al-Bakri considered him gifted and prolific. Abd al-Rahman participated in the Battle of the Camel in 656 on the side of the Qurayshites led by the prophet Muhammad's wife A'isha against Muhammad's cousin and son-in-law Ali. Ali's side was victorious and Abd al-Rahman and his half-brother Yahya ibn al-Hakam were both seriously wounded. They were escorted to safety in Syria, which was governed by an Umayyad, Mu'awiya ibn Abi Sufyan. Abd al-Rahman mourned the Qurayshites slain in the battle in verse.

Among Abd al-Rahman's best known verses are those castigating Mu'awiya, who became the first Umayyad caliph in 661, for adopting his governor in Iraq Ziyad ibn Abihi as his brother, fabricating his descent from Mu'awiya's father Abu Sufyan. His satirical criticisms reflected the Umayyad family's general opposition to the caliph's controversial decision. According to the account cited by al-Tabari, Mu'awiya punished Abd al-Rahman by withholding his stipend and compelling him to seek pardon from Ziyad's son and successor Ubayd Allah ibn Ziyad in Iraq. Abd al-Rahman spent most of his life in Medina, but was present on several occasions at the Umayyad court in Damascus during the reigns of Mu'awiya and his son and successor Yazid I. When Mu'awiya dismissed Marwan from the governorship of Medina, Abd al-Rahman attempted and failed to lobby Mu'awiya to restore Marwan to office. In the aftermath of the killing of Muhammad's grandson al-Husayn ibn Ali by Ubayd Allah ibn Ziyad (Yazid's governor of Iraq) in 680, Abd al-Rahman witnessed the delivery of al-Husayn's head to Yazid in Damascus and lamented the sight.

Marwan succeeded to the caliphate in 684 when most the empire was out of Umayyad hands. He led a decisive victory against the opponents of the Umayyads in Syria, the Qays tribes, at the Battle of Marj Rahit outside Damascus. Al-Tabari recorded a verse by Abd al-Rahman castigating the leader of the Qays, Zufar ibn al-Harith al-Kilabi, in the battle's aftermath.

Descendants of Abu al-As ibn Umayya

Umayya
Abu al-As
Affan	al-Hakam	Safiyya (wife of Abu Sufyan)	al-Mughira
Uthman (r. 644–656)	Marwan I (r. 684–685)	Uthman al-Azraq	al-Harith	Abd al-Rahman	Yahya	Habib	Aban	Mu'awiya
Uthmanids	Marwanids	Abd al-Malik	Abd al-Aziz	Abd al-Wahid	Abdallah	Abu Bakr (son-in-law of Marwan I)	Yusuf	al-Hakam	Umm Hakim (wife of Hisham)	Amina (wife of Hisham)	Umm Abd Allah (wife of Umar ibn al-Walid)	Umm Aban (wife of Sulayman)	A'isha (wife of Marwan I)
Isma'il	Khalid	Sa'id (Khudayna)	Abd Allah	Abd al-Malik	al-Hurr	Ayyub
Salama	Ubaydallah	Yahya	al-Hakam
Safwan
Muhammad
Abd al-Rahman

Horizontal dashed line indicates marriage
Vertical dashed line indicates skipped generation(s)
Descendants of third Rashidun caliph Uthman (r. 644–656)
Marwanid caliphs
Ruling dynasty of Umayyad Caliphate, 684–750

== Bibliography ==
- Brockett, Adrian, ed. (1997). The History of al-Ṭabarī, Volume XVI: The Community Divided: The Caliphate of ʿAlī I, A.D. 656–657/A.H. 35–36. SUNY Series in Near Eastern Studies. Albany, New York: State University of New York Press. ISBN 978-0-7914-2391-2.
- Hawting, G. R., ed. (1989). The History of al-Ṭabarī, Volume XX: The Collapse of Sufyānid Authority and the Coming of the Marwānids: The Caliphates of Muʿāwiyah II and Marwān I and the Beginning of the Caliphate of ʿAbd al-Malik, A.D. 683–685/A.H. 64–66. SUNY Series in Near Eastern Studies. Albany, New York: State University of New York Press. ISBN 978-0-88706-855-3.
- Kilpatrick, Hilary (2010). "ʿUmar ibn ʿAbd al-ʿAzīz, al-Walīd ibn Yazīd and their Kin: Images of the Umayyads in the Kitāb al-Aghānī". In Borrut, Antoine; Cobb, Paul M. (eds.). Umayyad Legacies: Medieval Memories from Syria to Spain. Leiden and Boston: Brill. pp. 63–88. ISBN 9789004184749.
- Madelung, Wilferd (1997). The Succession to Muhammad: A Study of the Early Caliphate. Cambridge: Cambridge University Press. ISBN 0-521-56181-7.
- Marsham, Andrew (2022). "Kinship, Dynasty, and the Umayyads". The Historian of Islam at Work: Essays in Honor of Hugh N. Kennedy. Leiden: Brill. pp. 12–45. ISBN 978-90-04-52523-8.
- Morony, Michael G., ed. (1987). The History of al-Ṭabarī, Volume XVIII: Between Civil Wars: The Caliphate of Muʿāwiyah, 661–680 A.D./A.H. 40–60. SUNY Series in Near Eastern Studies. Albany, New York: State University of New York Press. ISBN 978-0-87395-933-9.
- Robinson, Majied (2020). Marriage in the Tribe of Muhammad: A Statistical Study of Early Arabic Genealogical Literature. Berlin: Walter de Gruyter. ISBN 9783110624168.
- Sezgin, Fuat (1975). Geschichte des arabischen schriftums, Band II, Poesie bis ca. 430H (in German). Leiden: Brill. ISBN 90-04-043764.
- Wellhausen, Julius (1927). The Arab Kingdom and Its Fall. Translated by Margaret Graham Weir. Calcutta: University of Calcutta.
