= Mu'awiya ibn al-Mughira =

Member of the Banu Umayya (7th century)

Muʿāwiya ibn al-Mughīra ibn Abī al-ʿĀs ibn Umayya (Arabic: معاوية بن المغيرة بن أبي العاص بن أمية) was a member of the Banu Umayya alleged to be a spy against the Muslims during the time of the Islamic prophet Muhammad. He was captured during the Invasion of Hamra al-Asad, where Muhammad accused him of being a Meccan spy. He was a cousin of Uthman ibn Affan, who gave him shelter. He was given a grace period of three days and arranged a camel and provisions for his return journey to Mecca. Uthman departed with Muhammad for Hamra-al-Asad, and Mu'awiya overstayed his grace. Though he fled by the time the army returned, Muhammad ordered his pursuit and execution. The orders were carried out. This incident is also mentioned in Ibn Ishaq and Ibn Hisham's biography of Muhammad.

== Descendants ==
Mu'awiya's line of descent continued solely through his daughter, A'isha, who was married to another Umayyad and future caliph, Marwan ibn al-Hakam (r. 684–685). From this marriage, A'isha had two sons, the future caliph Abd al-Malik (r. 685–705) and Mu'awiya, and a daughter, Umm Amr. The latter was married to al-Walid, a son of Uthman (r. 644–656).

Descendants of Abu al-As ibn Umayya

Umayya
Abu al-As
Affan	al-Hakam	Safiyya (wife of Abu Sufyan)	al-Mughira
Uthman (r. 644–656)	Marwan I (r. 684–685)	Uthman al-Azraq	al-Harith	Abd al-Rahman	Yahya	Habib	Aban	Mu'awiya
Uthmanids	Marwanids	Abd al-Malik	Abd al-Aziz	Abd al-Wahid	Abdallah	Yusuf	al-Hakam	Umm Hakim (wife of Hisham)	Amina (wife of Hisham)	Umm Abd Allah (wife of Umar ibn al-Walid)	Umm Aban (wife of Sulayman)	A'isha (wife of Marwan I)
Isma'il	Khalid	Sa'id (Khudayna)	Abd Allah	Abd al-Malik	al-Hurr	Ayyub
Salama	Ubaydallah	Yusuf	al-Hakam
Safwan
Muhammad
Abd al-Rahman

Horizontal dashed line indicates marriage
Vertical dashed line indicates skipped generation(s)
Descendants of third Rashidun caliph Uthman (r. 644–656)
Marwanid caliphs
Ruling dynasty of Umayyad Caliphate, 684–750

== See also ==
- List of battles of Muhammad

== Bibliography ==
- Ahmed, Asad Q. (2011). The Religious Elite of the Early Islamic Ḥijāz: Five Prosopographical Case Studies. Oxford: University of Oxford Linacre College Unit for Prosopographical Research. ISBN 978-1-900934-13-8.
- Donner, Fred M. (2014). "Was Marwan ibn al-Hakam the First 'Real' Muslim". In Savant, Sarah Bowen; de Felipe, Helena (eds.). Genealogy and Knowledge in Muslim Societies: Understanding the Past. Edinburgh: Edinburgh University Press. pp. 105–114. ISBN 978-0-7486-4497-1.
