= Affan ibn Abi al-As =

Father of the third caliph, Uthman ibn Affan

Personal details
- Born: Mecca, Arabia
- Died: Arabia
- Spouse: Arwa bint Kurayz
- Relations: al-Hakam (brother); al-Mughira (brother); Safiyya (sister); Arwa (sister)
- Children: Uthman ibn Affan; Amina bint Affan
- Parent: Abu al-As ibn Umayya

ʿAffān ibn Abī al-ʿĀṣ (Arabic: عفان بن أبي العاص) was a 6th-century Arab merchant, a contemporary of the young Muhammad (c. 570–632) and the father of Uthman ibn Affan, the third Rashidun caliph (r. 644–656).

== Life ==
Affan was a son of Abu al-As ibn Umayya of the Banu Umayya (Umayyads)/Banu Abd Shams family of the Quraysh tribe of Mecca. His mother, Amina bint Abd al-Uzza ibn Hurthan, belonged to another Qurayshite family, the Banu Adi. Affan was married to his second cousin, Arwa bint Kurayz of the Abd Shams, with whom he had his son, the future caliph Uthman (r. 644–656), and two daughters. The mother of Affan's wife, Arwa, was a paternal aunt of the Islamic prophet Muhammad.

Affan is listed as one of the 22 Meccans "at the dawn of Islam" who knew how to write. He died at a young age while travelling abroad, leaving Uthman with a large inheritance. He became a merchant like his father, and his business flourished, making him one of the richest men among the Quraysh.

== Family tree ==
Quraysh tribe
Waqida bint Amr | Abd Manaf ibn Qusai | Ātikah bint Murrah
Nawfal ibn Abd Manaf | ‘Abd Shams | Barra | Hala | Muṭṭalib ibn Abd Manaf | Hashim | Salma bint Amr
Umayya ibn Abd Shams | ʿAbd al-Muṭṭalib
Harb | Abū al-ʿĀs | ʿĀminah | ʿAbdallāh | Hamza | Abī Ṭālib | Az-Zubayr | al-ʿAbbās | Abū Lahab
ʾAbī Sufyān ibn Harb | al-Ḥakam | ʿAffān | MUHAMMAD (Family tree) | Khadija bint Khuwaylid | ʿAlī (Family tree) | Khawlah bint Ja'far | Ibn Abbas
Muʿāwiyah I | Marwān I | ʿUthmān ibn ʿAffān | Ruqayya | Fatimah | Muhammad ibn al-Hanafiyyah | ʿAli ibn ʿAbdallāh
Sufyanids | Marwanids | al-Ḥasan | al-Ḥusayn (Family tree) | Abu Hasim (Imām of al-Mukhtār and Hashimiyya) | Muhammad "al-Imām" (Abbasids)
Ibrāhim "al-Imām" | al-Saffāḥ | al-Mansur

Descendants of Abu al-As ibn Umayya

Umayya
Abu al-As
Affan | al-Hakam | Safiyya (wife of Abu Sufyan) | al-Mughira
Uthman (r. 644–656) | Marwan I (r. 684–685) | Uthman al-Azraq | al-Harith | Abd al-Rahman | Yahya | Habib | Aban | Mu'awiya
Uthmanids | Marwanids | Abd al-Malik | Abd al-Aziz | Abd al-Wahid | Abdallah | Yusuf | al-Hakam | Umm Hakim (wife of Hisham) | Amina (wife of Hisham) | Umm Abd Allah (wife of Umar ibn al-Walid) | Umm Aban (wife of Sulayman) | A'isha (wife of Marwan I)
Isma'il | Khalid | Sa'id (Khudayna) | Abd Allah | Abd al-Malik | al-Hurr | Ayyub
Salama | Ubaydallah | Yahya | al-Hakam
Safwan
Muhammad
Abd al-Rahman

Horizontal dashed line indicates marriage
Vertical dashed line indicates skipped generation(s)
Descendants of third Rashidun caliph Uthman (r. 644–656)
Marwanid caliphs
Ruling dynasty of Umayyad Caliphate, 684–750

== Sources ==
- Marsham, Andrew (2022). "Kinship, Dynasty and the Umayyads". The Historian of Islam at Work: Essays in Honor of Hugh N. Kennedy. Leiden: Brill. pp. 12–45. ISBN 978-90-04-52523-8.
