= Al-Harith ibn al-Hakam =

Senior adviser and cousin of Caliph Uthman

Al-Ḥārith ibn al-Ḥakam ibn Abī al-ʿĀṣ ibn Umayya was a senior adviser and cousin of Caliph Uthman (r. 644–656). He played a role in the expedition against the Byzantines of North Africa in 647 and was later appointed supervisor of the market in the caliphal capital of Medina. His sons and grandsons were estate holders and governors under their paternal kinsmen, the Umayyad caliphs, particularly the Marwanid house of al-Harith's brother Marwan I which ruled from 684 until 750.

== Life ==
Al-Harith was a son of al-Hakam ibn Abi al-As and brother to Marwan I, the future Umayyad caliph. He was a paternal first cousin of Caliph Uthman (r. 644–656). Under Uthman, al-Harith and Marwan played influential roles as the caliph's top counsels.

According to al-Baladhuri, in 647 (or 648 or 649) the caliph put al-Harith at the head of an army to reinforce his governor of Egypt, Abd Allah ibn Abi Sarh, who upon the reinforcements' arrival, assumed overall command and led the Muslim forces on campaign against the Exarchate of Africa (Byzantine-controlled North Africa).

Uthman appointed al-Harith to supervise the market of Medina, then the capital of the Caliphate. This caused consternation among the Ansar (natives of Medina) who considered it an encroachment of their control in their native city. Reports in the early Islamic tradition mentioned a particular incident that aroused Ansarite hostility, namely that al-Harith used his post to purchase goods and sell them in the market at considerable profit. Protests lodged to the caliph in response were dismissed and the Ansar became further angered when Uthman awarded al-Harith a gift of camels collected as sadaqa (alms tax). Uthman had previously angered members of the community, particularly Abu Dharr al-Ghifari, when he awarded al-Harith a huge sum of money from the tribute collected during the military campaigns in Byzantine North Africa. He also gave al-Harith an estate at al-Manzur, in the vicinity of Medina.

== Descendants ==
Al-Harith was married to A'isha, a daughter of Caliph Uthman. They had two sons, Uthman and Abu Bakr, the latter of whom married Ramla, a daughter of Marwan, who became caliph in 684, founding the Marwanid line of Umayyad caliphs which ruled until 750. Al-Harith's daughter Umm Kulthum was married to Caliph Uthman's son Amr ibn Uthman. Many descendants of al-Harith were favored under the Marwanids. A son of al-Harith, Abd al-Malik, was appointed by al-Harith's nephew Caliph Abd al-Malik (r. 685–705) to command a military operation in Wadi al-Qura in 685 or 686 during the Second Fitna. Al-Harith's son Abd al-Wahid held an estate called Marj Abd al-Wahid after him in Syria, the metropolitan province of the Umayyad Caliphate. He invested in it, turning the meadow into pasture grounds for Muslim use for which he was praised in verse by the poet al-Qatami. Another son, Abd al-Aziz, was a secretary of Caliph Sulayman (r. 715–717).

Al-Harith's grandson, Sa'id ibn Abd al-Aziz, commonly and derogatorily known as Sa'id Khudhayna (khudhayna was a term used by the Arabs to refer to the wives of Iranian nobles and essentially meant 'little princess') was the governor Khurasan in 720 under his father-in-law Maslama ibn Abd al-Malik, a grandson of Marwan I. Another of al-Harith's grandsons, Khalid ibn Abd al-Malik, served as the governor of Medina for Caliph Hisham ibn Abd al-Malik, grandson of Marwan. Khalid's brother Isma'il was married to Hammada, a daughter of Hasan ibn Hasan, a grandson of Caliph Ali, and he had two sons with her.

Descendants of Abu al-As ibn Umayya

Umayya
Abu al-As
Affan	al-Hakam	Safiyya (wife of Abu Sufyan)	al-Mughira
Uthman (r. 644–656)	Marwan I (r. 684–685)	Uthman al-Azraq	al-Harith	Abd al-Rahman	Umm al-Banin (wife of Sa'id ibn al-As)	Yahya	Habib	Aban	Mu'awiya
Uthmanids	Marwanids	Abd al-Malik	Abd al-Aziz	Abd al-Wahid	Abdallah	Abu Bakr (son-in-law of Marwan I)	Yusuf	al-Hakam	Umm Hakim (wife of Hisham)	Amina (wife of Hisham)	Umm Abd Allah (wife of Umar ibn al-Walid)	Umm Aban (wife of Sulayman)	A'isha (wife of Marwan I)
Isma'il	Khalid	Sa'id (Khudayna)	Abd Allah	Abd al-Malik	al-Hurr	Ayyub
Salama	Ubaydallah	Yahya	al-Hakam
Safwan
Muhammad
Abd al-Rahman

Horizontal dashed line indicates marriage
Vertical dashed line indicates skipped generation(s)
Descendants of third Rashidun caliph Uthman (r. 644–656)
Marwanid caliphs
Ruling dynasty of Umayyad Caliphate, 684–750

== Bibliography ==
- Ahmed, Asad Q. (2011). The Religious Elite of the Early Islamic Ḥijāz: Five Prosopographical Case Studies. Oxford: University of Oxford Linacre College Unit for Prosopographical Research. ISBN 978-1-900934-13-8.
- Caetani, Leone; Gabrieli, Giuseppe (1915). Onomasticon Arabicum, Volume 2, A'abil—Abdallah. Rome: Casa Editrice Italiana.
- Hitti, Philip Khuri (1916). The Origins of the Islamic State, Being a Translation from the Arabic, Accompanied with Annotations, Geographic and Historic Notes of the Kitâb Fitûh al-Buldân of al-Imâm Abu-l Abbâs Ahmad Ibn-Jâbir al-Balâdhuri, Volume 1. New York and London: Columbia University & Longman, Green & Co.
- Kennedy, Hugh (2004) [1986]. The Prophet and the Age of the Caliphates: The Islamic Near East from the 6th to the 11th Century (Second ed.). Harlow: Longman. ISBN 978-0-582-40525-7.
- Madelung, Wilferd (1997). The Succession to Muhammad: A Study of the Early Caliphate. Cambridge: Cambridge University Press. ISBN 0-521-56181-7.
- McMillan, M.E. (2011). The Meaning of Mecca: The Politics of Pilgrimage in Early Islam. London: Saqi. ISBN 978-0-86356-437-6.
- Powers, David S., ed. (1989). The History of al-Ṭabarī, Volume XXIV: The Empire in Transition: The Caliphates of Sulaymān, ʿUmar, and Yazīd, A.D. 715–724/A.H. 96–105. SUNY Series in Near Eastern Studies. Albany, New York: State University of New York Press. ISBN 978-0-7914-0072-2.
