= Layla bint Abi Murrah al-Thaqafi =

Wife of Husayn ibn Ali

Layla bint Abi Murrah Arabic: لَيْلَىٰ بِنْت أَبِي مُرَّة
- Born: c. 7th century
- Other name: Umm Layla
- Spouse: Husayn ibn Ali
- Children: Ali al-Akbar; Fatima al-Sughra
- Parents: Abu Murrah ibn Urwah al-Thaqafi (father); Maymunah bint Abi Sufyan (mother)
- Relatives: Urwah ibn Mas'ud (paternal-grandfather); Umm Sa'id bint Urwah(Paternal-aunt); Umm Habiba (maternal-aunt); Abu Sufyan ibn Harb (maternal-grandfather); Mu'awiya ibn Abi Sufyan (maternal-uncle)

Laylā bint Abī Murrah ibn ʿUrwah ibn Masʿūd al-Thaqafī (Arabic: لَيْلَىٰ بِنْت أَبِي مُرَّة ٱبْن عُرْوَة ٱبْن مَسْعُود ٱلثَّقَفِيّ), also known as Umm Laylā (Arabic: أُمّ لَيْلَىٰ), was a wife of Husayn ibn Ali and the mother of Ali al-Akbar and Fatima al-Sughra. She was the niece of Mu'awiya ibn Abi Sufyan. Her grandfather Urwah ibn Mas'ud was considered by Muhammad as one of the four chiefs of Islam. Allamah Mamqani counts her as one of the female narrators of traditions.
