= Ali al-Akbar ibn Husayn =

Great-grandson of the Islamic prophet Muhammad (c. 655–680)

Ali al-Akbar عَلِيّ ٱلْأَكْبَر
- 1978 Iranian painting showing the death of Ali al-Akbar, with his father Husayn crying.

Personal life
- Born: c. Between 655-662 CE Medina, Arabia
- Died: 10 October 680 (age 18-25) (10 Muharram 61 AH) Karbala, Iraq
- Resting place: Imam Husayn Shrine
- Parents: Husayn ibn Ali (father); Umm Layla (mother)

Religious life
- Religion: Islam

Ali al-Akbar ibn al-Husayn (Arabic: عَلِيّ ٱلْأَكْبَر بن ٱلْحُسَيْن), commonly known as Ali al-Akbar, was a great-grandson of the Islamic prophet Muhammad and a son of Husayn. Aged between eighteen and twenty-five, al-Akbar was martyred at the Battle of Karbala in 680, alongside his father and most relatives and supporters, who fought against the army of the Umayyad caliph Yazid. Ali al-Akbar is commemorated in Shia Islam as a brave youth martyred before he could marry, and celebrated for his striking resemblance, in appearance and manners, to his great-grandfather, Muhammad.

== Birth ==
Ali al-Akbar was born to Husayn ibn Ali, the third Shia imam. Husayn was a grandson of the Islamic prophet Muhammad and a son of Ali ibn Abi Talib, the first Shia imam and also a cousin of Muhammad. All three men belonged to the Banu Hashim tribe. Mother of Ali al-Akbar was Layla, daughter of Abu Murra, who was the son of Urwa ibn Mas'ud, a companion of Muhammad from the Banu Thaqif tribe. The maternal grandmother of Ali al-Akbar, Maymuna, was the daughter of Abu Sufyan, chief of the Banu Umayya tribe. Shortly after the birth of Ali al-Akbar, Husayn’s sister named Zaynab requested to adopt and raise Ali as her own child. After Umm Layla, the mother of Ali agreed to this, Ali was given to Zaynab and raised as her adopted son. Shortly before the battle of Karbala, Husayn instructed Ali al-Akbar to go into Umm Layla’s tent and introduce himself as her son.

Ali al-Akbar is often celebrated for his striking resemblance to Muhammad, both in appearance and manners, so much so that others looked at Ali al-Akbar whenever they missed Muhammad. This similarity also explains the Persian epithet of Ali al-Akbar, Shabih-e Payghambar (lit. 'prophet's likeness').

Ali al-Akbar (lit. 'Ali, the elder') was the eldest son of Husayn, per majority of the early authorities, including the Sunni scholars Ibn Sa'd (d. 845) and al-Baladhuri (d. 892) and the pro-Shia historian al-Ya'qubi (d. 897–898). Ali al-Akbar was therefore older than Ali Zayn al-Abidin, the only son of Husayn who survived the Battle of Karbala. The Islamicist W. Madelung (d. 2023), however, thought that Zayn al-Abidin was the eldest son of Husayn. The birthdate of Ali al-Akbar is also disputed and his age at the Battle of Karbala in 680 CE is variously reported as 18, 19, 23, or 25. Among all these reports, 25 might be the most likely age because his younger brother, Ali Zayn al-Abidin, was probably 23 years old at the time of Karbala.

== Battle of Karbala and death (680) ==
=== Accession of Yazid ===
In an appointment that violated earlier agreements with Husayn's brother Hasan, the Umayyad caliph Mu'awiya (r. 661–680) designated his son Yazid (r. 680–683) as his successor in 676. Yazid is often presented by Muslim historians as a debaucher who openly violated the Islamic norms, and his nomination was indeed met with resistance at the time from sons of some prominent companions of Muhammad, including Husayn ibn Ali. On Mu'awiya's death and Yazid's accession in 680, the latter instructed the governor of Medina to secure Husayn's pledge of allegiance by force. Husayn thus Going to Mecca at night to reject recognizing Yazid as the caliph. He was accompanied by some relatives, including Ali al-Akbar.

=== Journey to Karbala ===
After receiving invitations from residents of Kufa, whose support were confirmed by his cousin Muslim ibn Aqil, Husayn left Mecca for Kufa on 8 or 10 Dhu al-Hijja (10 or 12 September 680), accompanied by a few relatives and supporters. A tradition attributed to Husayn explains that he left to fight the tyranny of Yazid, even though it would cost his life, as reported in al-Irshad, a biographical work by the prominent Shia scholar al-Mufid (d. 1022). Husayn also wrote in his will for his brother Muhammad ibn al-Hanafiyya that he had not set out to seek "corruption or oppression" but rather to "enjoin what is right and forbid what is wrong."

On their way to Kufa, Husayn is said to have had a dream about the eminent deaths of his companions when he briefly fell asleep on his horse. He woke up reciting verse 2:156 of the Quran, "To God we belong, and to Him is our return," offering praise to God multiple times. Ali al-Akbar rode to him and learned about the dream, but welcomed his fate. This account appears in Tarikh al-Tabari, related by Uqba ibn Sam'an, who survived the Battle of Karbala. Soon afterward, Husayn's small caravan was intercepted by Yazid's army and forced to camp in the desert land of Karbala on 2 Muharram 61 (2 October 680) away from water and fortifications. The promised Kufan support did not materialize as the new governor of Kufa, Ubayd Allah ibn Ziyad (d. 686), captured and killed Muslim ibn Aqil, the envoy of Husayn, and intimidated Kufan tribal chiefs.

=== Water shortage ===
On 7 Muharram, on orders of Ibn Ziyad, the Umayyad commander Umar ibn Sa'd (d. 686) cut off Husayn's access to the Euphrates river. Husayn's half-brother, Abbas ibn Ali, and some fifty companions were nevertheless able to bring back some water to Husayn's camp in a night sortie. Despite this attempt, the Islamicist L. Veccia Vaglieri (d. 1989) suggests that the camp suffered from thirst for the following three days. Among other experts, D. Pinault similarly writes that the camp suffered from hunger and thirst during the siege, particularly the many young children in the camp, and the opinion of A. Hamdar is close. Karbala has a hot desert climate.

=== Negotiations ===
Ibn Sa'd was instructed by Ibn Ziyad not to let Husayn leave unless he pledged his allegiance to Yazid. Husayn did not submit to Yazid, but evidently negotiated with Ibn Ziyad through Ibn Sa'd to be allowed to retreat and avoid bloodshed. The governor did not relent, however, and finally ordered Ibn Sa'd to fight, kill, and disfigure Husayn and his supporters unless they pledged allegiance to Yazid, in which case their fate would be decided later.

=== Tasu'a ===
Ibn Sa'd decided to attack on Tasu'a (9 Muharram) after the afternoon prayer. As the Umayyad army approached, however, Husayn dispatched Abbas and some other companions, who convinced Ibn Sa'd to delay the confrontation until the following day. Husayn now besieged his followers in a speech to leave and not risk their lives for his sake, after which Abbas was the first to renew his support, saying that he would follow his brother in life or death. Nearly all those present stayed with Husayn until the end. Husayn and his companions spent that night praying and reciting the Quran, as reported by the Shia jurist Ibn Tawus (d. 1266) and in most maqatil works.

=== Ashura ===
On the morning of Ashura (10 Muharram), Husayn organized his supporters, some seventy-two men. He then spoke to the enemy lines and asked them why they considered it lawful to kill the grandson of Muhammad. Probably after this speech, the Umayyad commander al-Hurr ibn Yazid al-Tamimi defected to Husayn's side. The Umayyad army then showered the camp with arrows, thus commencing the battle which lasted from morning till sunset and consisted of incidents of single combat, at least throughout the morning, skirmishes, assaults, and retreats. By the early afternoon, however, the Umayyad army had encircled the camp, and the companions had all fallen.

==== Death ====
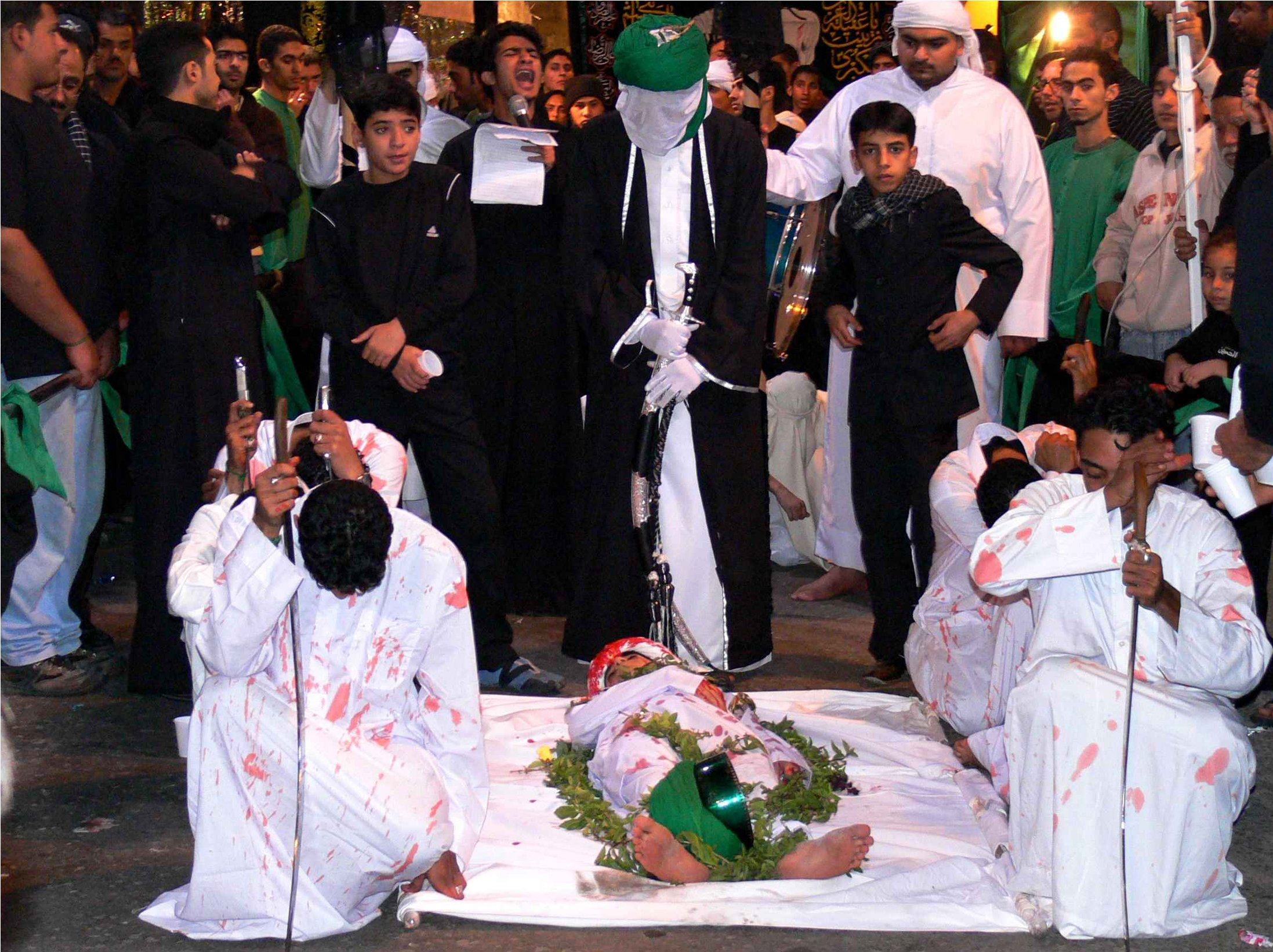
Husayn standing over the body of his dead son, Ali al-Akbar, in a reenactment of Ashura in Bahrain

Among the Alids, that is, the descendants of Ali ibn Abi Talib, Ali a-Akbar was the first to receive permission to fight and enter the battlefield. The accounts presented in popular literature, however, sometimes place him among the last to be killed. For instance, Ali is presented as the seventeenth casualty in Rawzat al-shohada by Husayn Kashifi (d. 1504), the Timurid-era poet and preacher. Ali al-Akbar is said to have charged multiple times at the enemy lines. After one of his charges, he returned from the battlefield, injured and parched with thirst, and complained of thirst. Husayn consoled him that his thirst would soon be quenched at the hands of his great-grandfather Muhammad. Ali al-Akbar then returned to fight and was finally felled by Murra ibn Sa'd, who is said to have struck Ali from behind. He fell and was surrounded by Umayyad soldiers who "cut him to pieces." In most reports, his killer is named Murra ibn Munqidh al-Abdi, who later survived a revenge attempt by the pro-Alid revolutionary Mukhtar al-Thaqafi (d. 687), but was severely wounded. A grief-stricken Husayn wept over the body of his dead son and, and lamented, "The world has ended," and, "There will be [only] dust on the world after you," according to al-Irshad. Husayn's sister Zaynab rushed there too and Husayn finally returned to the camp with her inconsolable sister. He then asked other young men to carry the body of Ali al-Akbar back to the camp.

The battle ended when the lone-standing Husayn was killed in the afternoon. The severed heads of Ali al-Akbar and others were afterward taken to Ibn Ziyad in Kufa and then to Yazid in Damascus, where his head was likely buried in the Bab al-Saghir cemetery. The women and children, taken captive after the battle, were marched alongside to Kufa and then Damascus.

== Shrine ==
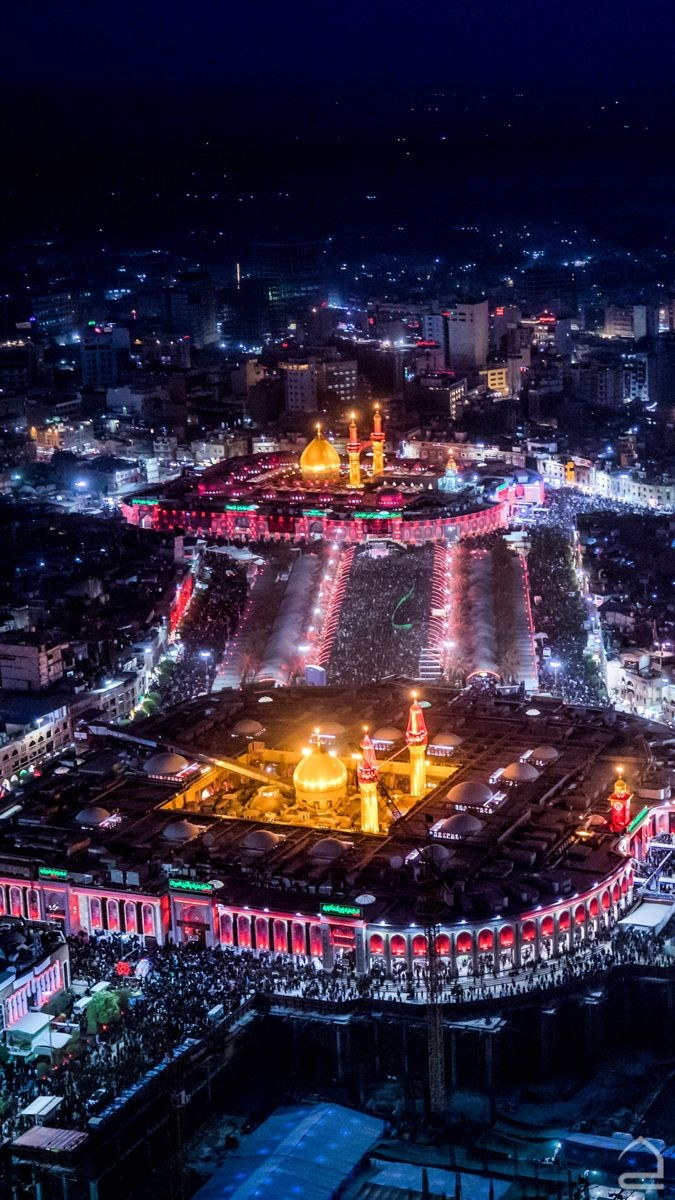
The shrine of Husayn and the nearby shrine of his half-brother Abbas in Karbala, Iraq

The fallen supporters of Husayn were buried by some men of the Banu Asad tribe from the al-Ghadiriyya village. In particular, Ali al-Akbar was buried next to his father. Today, the two tombs are located under the central dome of the shrine of Husayn in the city of Karbala, in present-day Iraq. The city developed around the shrine and has become a destination for pilgrimage and a center for religious learning. There are also passages devoted to Ali al-Akbar in the supplications recited by pilgrims. He left no descendents.

== Commemoration in Shia Islam ==
Following the precedents of Shia imams in mourning Husayn, Shia Muslims commemorate the Karbala events throughout the months of Muharram and Safar, particularly during the first ten days of Muharram, culminating on Ashura with processions in major Shia cities. The main component of these ritual ceremonies (maj'alis, sing. majlis) is the narration of the stories of Karbala, intended to raise sympathy and move the audience to tears. It is in this context that the memory of Ali al-Akbar is celebrated from the West Indies to Southeast Asia. In particular, in Iranian ritual ta'ziyeh performances (similar to passion plays), Ali al-Akbar is often featured as an unfortunate brave youth who was martyred before he could marry. A parallel is thus drawn in Shia Islam between Abraham's sacrifice of his son Isma'il and Husayn's sacrifice of Ali al-Akbar.

== See also ==
- Abbas ibn Ali
- Zaynab bint Ali
- Ali ibn Husayn Zayn al-Abidin
- Sakina bint Husayn
- Ruqayya bint Husayn
