= Tihamah =

Red Sea coastal plain of the Arabian Peninsula

Tihamah تِهَامَة
- Map of the Tihamah of Hijaz and Yemen shown on the west coast of the Arabian Peninsula
- Region: Arabian Peninsula
- Countries: Saudi Arabia; Yemen
- Named for: Proto-Semitic term for "sea"
- Cities: Jeddah, Yanbu, Al Qunfudhah, Jizan, Midi, Hodeidah, Al Khawkhah, and Mokha

Population
  - Total: 6–7 million
- Demonym: Tihami

Tihamah (Note: Arabic: تِهَامَةُ, romanized: Tihāmah) is the Red Sea coastal plain of the Arabian Peninsula from the Gulf of Aqaba to the Bab el Mandeb.

== Etymology ==
Tihāmat is the Proto-Semitic language's term for 'sea'. Tiamat was the ancient Mesopotamian god of the sea and of chaos. The word appears in masculine form in the Hebrew Bible as təhōm (Genesis 1:2), meaning "primordial ocean, abyss".

== History ==
=== Era of Muhammad ===
During the era of the Islamic prophet Muhammad, many military expeditions took place here including the Battle of Hamra al-Asad and caravan raids. Beginning in January 623 CE, some of the Muslims resorted to the tradition of raiding the Meccan caravans that traveled along the eastern coast of the Red Sea from Mecca to the Syrian region.

While at Ḥamra' al-Asad (حَمْرَاء ٱلْأَسَد), Muhammad made an agreement with Mabad al-Khuzaah at Tihamah, in which Mabad pledged not to conceal anything from him. Mabad was then sent to Mecca to dissuade Abu Sufyan ibn Harb from fighting. In Mecca, Mabad met with Abu Sufyan and exaggerated that Muhammad had gathered a great force to fight Abu Sufyan. Abu Sufyan and his companions were planning a massive and decisive attack on Medina to finish off the Muslims once and for all. Hearing Mabad's talk of the great military strength of Muhammad, Abu Sufyan retreated from his plan of an immediate attack on the Muslims. In this fashion Muhammad successfully managed to prevent the massive onslaught the Meccans were planning.

== Geography ==
Red Sea topographic map

The region is sometimes subdivided into two parts, Tihāmat Al-Ḥijaz (تِهَامَة ٱلْحِجَاز; northern part) and Tihāmat ʿAsīr (تِهَامَة عَسِيْر; southern part). The Yemeni part (Arabic: تِهَامَة ٱلْيَمَن, romanized: Tihāmat Al-Yaman) is an extension of Tihamat ʿAsir. The plain is constricted and attains its greatest widths, 60 to 80 km (37 to 50 miles), south of Medina and Mecca. The cities of Yanbu, Jeddah and Al Qunfudhah are located in the Hijazi part of the Tihamah. The Asiri-Yemeni part of the Tihami plain includes the cities of Jizan and Hodeidah.

=== Climate ===
The temperatures in Tihamah are probably some of the hottest on earth. Tihamah in Arabic means severe heat and lack of wind.

Tihamah coastal plain is dry, sometimes interspersed with marshes though. Tihamah is cooler than Hejaz and Nejd. The temperature degree during summer averages 32C° while winter temperature is around 16C°. This region receives regular rainfall. The humidity on the coast is so high in the summer that a mist often sprinkles the coastal areas in the daytime and a warm fog hangs in the air at night.

== Flora ==
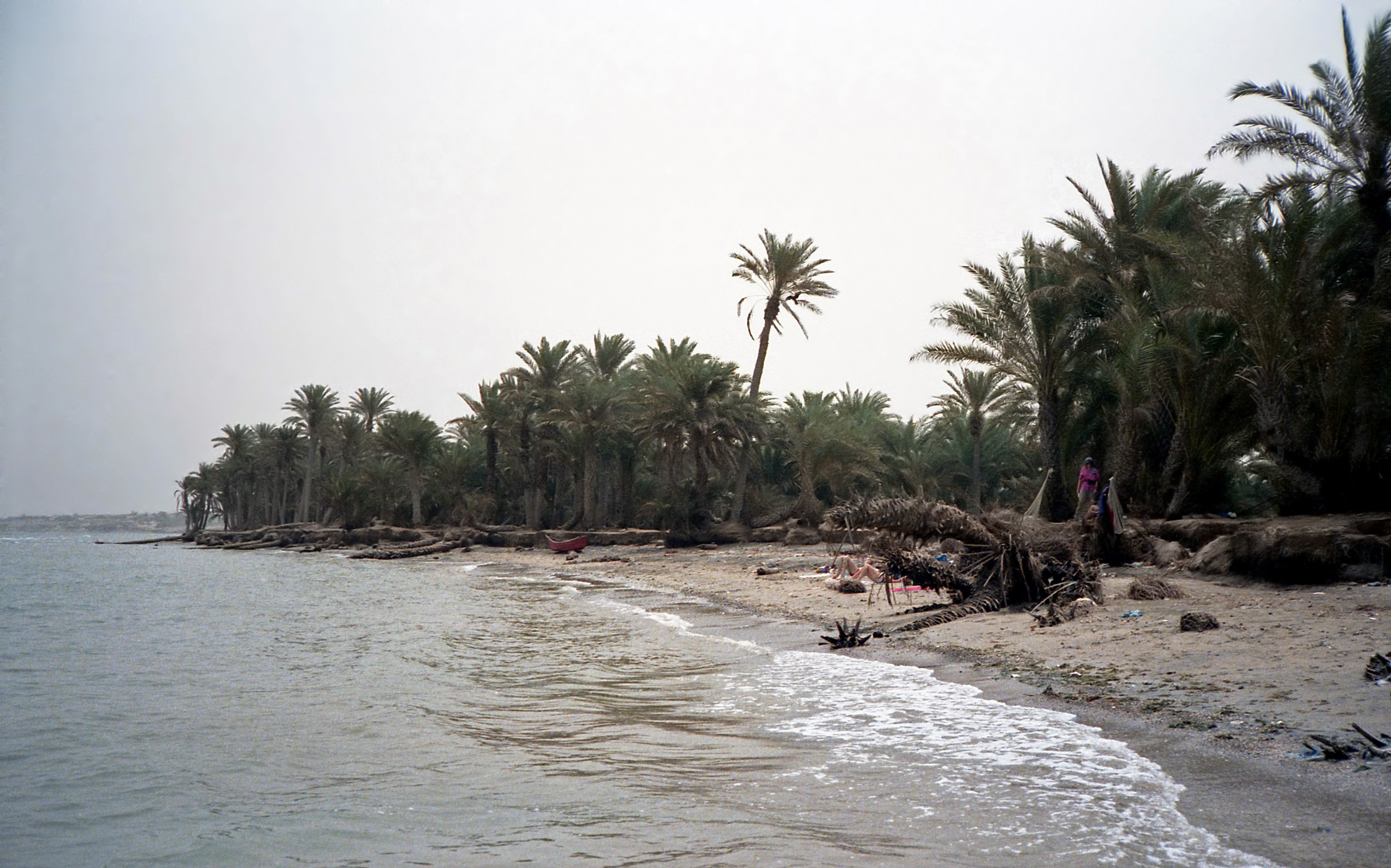
Date palm trees on the Yemeni coast of the Red Sea near Khaukha

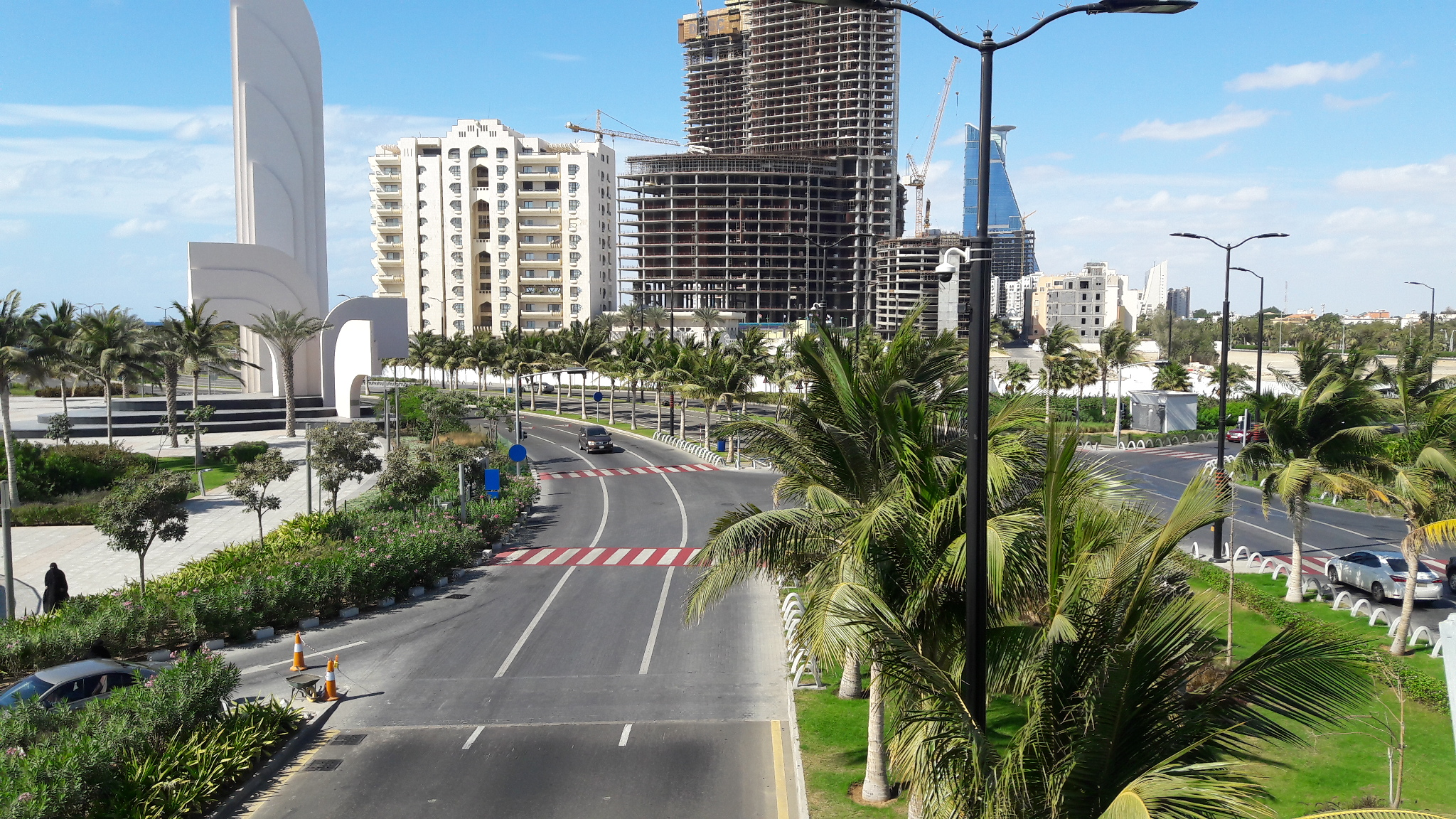
Jeddah in the Saudi part of the Tihamah

The extensive sandy coastal plain (the Tihamah) is a hot and inhospitable area parallel to the Red Sea, and most of it, north of Zabid (Yemen), is devoid of trees. However, in a few places there is dense shrub composed almost exclusively of Vachellia flava and it may be assumed that this was originally the dominant natural vegetation of the Tihamah. Salvadora persica occurs in thickets, and there are odd trees of Balanites aegyptiaca and colonies of wild doum palm (Hyphaene thebaica), as well as planted date palms (Phoenix dactylifera).

== Archaeology ==
Over sixteen megalithic menhirs were discovered by Edward Keall, director of the Royal Ontario Museum's Canadian Archaeological Mission near the village of Al-Mutaynah (ٱلْمُتَيْنَة) in the Tihami area. The stones were made of granite and weighted up to 20 tonnes (20,000 kg). Three of the upright stones measured around 8 feet (2.4 m) tall with one fallen being over 20 metres (66 ft) in length. Copper tools suggested to date to the same era as the construction of the stones were dated to around 2400 to 1800 BCE. An even more archaic lithic industry was found along with pottery sherds that were dated between 1200 and 800 BCE.

== See also ==
- Tihamah Region, a federal region in Yemen
- Kingdom of Hejaz
- Najd
