= Hashem Gharaibeh =

Jordanian author

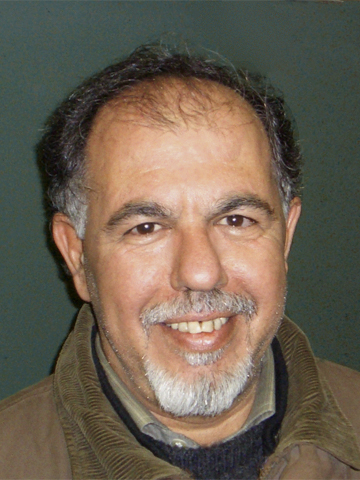
- Born: 1953 (68-69 years old) Irbid, Jordan
- Occupation: Author
- Language: Arabic
- Citizenship: Jordan

Hashem Bdeiwi Gharaibeh is a contemporary Jordanian author born in 1951 in the Northern Jordanian village of Hawara.

== Biography ==
=== Early life and education ===
Hashem Gharaibeh was born in the Jordanian city of Irbid on January 1, 1953. He completed his high school education and graduated from the Irbid High School for Boys in 1970. Then, he obtained a Bachelor's in Medical Laboratory Sciences in Iraq, and another Bachelor's in Economy from Yarmouk University in 1990.

=== Arrests ===
He was arrested in 1977 for being a member of the Communist Party, and he was sentenced for ten years in prison before getting released in 1985 following an amnesty. He was arrested again in 1989 for five months in the Swaqa prison in Jordan.

=== Career ===
Gharaibeh was the editor for the magazine Baraʿimu Amman (Buds of Amman) published by Amman Safety. He was also the editorial director for (Wisam) magazine published by the Jordanian Ministry of Culture. Then, he was appointed the director of the Cultural Department in Irbid. Gharaibeh is also a member of the Jordanian Writers Association and was elected for a number of its administrative positions.

== Publications ==
=== Novels ===
- Baytul ‘Asrar (House of Secrets), Dar Al-Ufuq Publishing, 1982.
- Al-Maqamatul Ramliya (The Sand Set-up), 1998.
- Jannatul Shahbandar (Shahbandar’s Paradise), Dar Al-Adab Publishing, 2003.
- Petra, Al-Safir Publishing, 2006.
- Awraqu Ma’badal Al-Katba (The Paper of The KatbaTemple), Ministry of Culture, Amman, 2008.
- Al-Qittul Allathi ‘Allamani Al-Tayaran (The Cat Who Taught Me Flying), Dar Al-Fada'at Publishing, Amman, 2011.
- Al-Bahhar (The Seaman), Al-Dar Al-Ahliya Publishing, 2017.
- Yarda Shamsa, Dar Al-Khutu Wal Thilal Publishing, 2020.

=== Short story collections ===
- Humumun Saghira (Trivial Concerns), Jordanian Writers Association, 1980.
- Qalbul Madina (The Heart of The City), 1994, and it was translated into German in 2004 by Ursula Passier).
- ‘Adwal Kalam (Talking Infection), Arab Institute for Research & Publishing, 2001, and some of the stories in the collection were translated into EN.
- Habbatu Qamhin (A Piece of Wheat), Al-’Aan Publishing, 2015.
- Qisasu Jaddati Al-Hakimat (Stories of My Wise Grand Mothers), Dar Al-Bayrouni Publishing, 2017.

=== Plays ===
- Kana Wa Mazala (Was and Is)
- Al-Babul Mashur (The Encanted [sic?] Door)
- Masraa’ Maqbul Ibnu Maqbul (The Assasination [sic?] of Maqbul Ibn Maqbul), 1985.
- Al-Wuqufu ‘Ala Qadamin Wahida (Standing On One Foot), Al-Kindi Publishing, 1990.
- Al-Ghabatul Mashura (The Enchanted Forest), 1995.
- At-Tariq (The Road), 2008.

=== Children's fiction ===
- Ghurabun Abyadu Aswadu (A Black and White Crow), 1992.
- Ghizlanul Nada (Dew's Gazelles), 1999.
- As-Samakatul Dahika (The Laughing Fish), 2000, which is an Arabization of an Alberto Moravia Story.

=== Studies ===
- Aj-Jinsu Fi Thaqafitil Tiflil ‘Arabiy (Sex and The Culture of The Arab Child).
- Awhamun Sadiya Wa Fitishiya Fi Adabul Atfalil Arabiy (Sadist and Fetishist Delusions in Arabic Children's Literature).

=== Other publications ===
- Al-Hayatu Abra Thuqubil Jidar (Life Through Holes in The Wall), 1993.
- Al-Makhfi A’tham (What's Hidden is Greater), Arab Institute for Research & Publishing, Beirut, 2001.
- Shaqa’qul Nu’man (Poppy Anemones).
- Sana Wahida Takfi (One Year is Enough: A Memoir), Hachette Antoine, 2019.

== Prizes ==
- He won the 1987 Mahmoud Saif Ad-Dein Al-Irani short story prize from the Jordanian Writers Association for his short story collection Humumun Saghira (Trivial Concerns).
- He won the 2008 Muhammad Nazzal Al-Armouti Creativity and Ammani Studies Prize for his novel (Shahbandar).

== Shahbandar ==
His novel (Shahbandar) is about Amman, talking about its architecture, markets, people in their appearances, behaviors, and backwardness. Shahbandar is Amman and the dark mysterious sexual crimes in our Arab societies. The novel was born from the notebooks of an Ammani drunkard who used to work at a liquor store in the 1930s, and this notebook was given to him by his friend (Khaldun Ad-Dawud). The novel was published by Dar Al-Adab Publishing in Beirut, 2003.

== Petra/The Battle of Nabataens ==
This novel talks about the end of the Al-Harith ibn al-Hakam I rule in the year 69 B.C. It also talks about Nabataens who built their city in hard wherever hard stone was found, whether down south in Tayma and Al-Ula or up north in Basra and Sweida. The novel consists of three parts. It was published by the Jordanian Ministry of Culture in 2006.

== The Cat Who Taught Me Flying ==
Al-Qittul Allathi ‘Allamani Al-Tayaran (The Cat Who Taught Me Flying) is a novel that was published in 2011 by Dar Al-Fada'at Publishing in Amman. It is a novel about what is pretty and what is ugly. The novel is derived from the author's sexual experience in a small prison with other tough but honest prisoners. The filcher is addicted to filching pills and unearthing them. The thief is addicted to stealing. The rapist is addicting to raping the prisoners, especially those who are weak. The homosexual is addicted to homosexuality. Even a person's stupidity distinguishes one from the other; hence, they keep repeating the same actions. These people's souls are ransacked, but they are full of life.

The boy gets jailed for homosexuality. The hard part is not for his sexual orientation, but his rebellious soul and his dreams. He finds solace in a friendship with a thief called (Al-Qitt), who is a compound personality and whose love for freedom does not overflow unless he needs it to. The novel follows the friendship between these two characters and the relation between the other prisoners. The novel branches out to uncover an unfamiliar yet familiar world.

Al-Qittul Allathi ‘Allamani Al-Tayaran (The Cat Who Taught Me Flying) is a look at the limitations of space whilst questioning time. It deals with time as fluid, taking the shape of place, and it deals with place as concrete. We cannot see in darkness, for time is a lamp and action is the oil that ignites it. Despite the cyclical nature of prison, these characters dream of leaving.

== The Paper of The Books Temple ==
The novel talks about changes in the country, society, and people in the Nabtaen capital, Petra. It carries a message from the time of the Nabataens, Jesus, John the Baptist, Herodus, and Caligula to the present time. The heroes, villains, and narrators are Sufian Al-Katbi's family members and their surroundings; the witnesses of the flourishing of Petra's civilization. It also talks about the dreams and sorrows Katba's Temple Crew during the ruling of Al-Harith IV of Petra, his coalition, and sending them Herod The Great with the Roman ruler Vitellius to attack Petra; he fails. The novel consists of two parts: Al-Katbi's maze and the sorrows of the left. It was published by the ministry of culture as part of a creative project in 2008.
