= Ma'bad ibn Abi Ma'bad =

Ma'bad ibn Abi Ma'bad al-Khuza'i (Arabic: معبد بن أبي معبد الخزاعي) was a companion of Muhammad who supported him during the Battle of Hamra al-Asad at Tihamah, where Ma'bad pledged to disclose all information to him. Ma'bad was subsequently dispatched to Mecca to disseminate misleading information. While in Mecca, Ma'bad encountered Abu Sufyan ibn Harb and conveyed fabricated claims that Muhammad had assembled a formidable force against him. Abu Sufyan and his allies were reportedly planning a large-scale, decisive assault onn Medina to eliminate the Muslim community. Upon learning of Muhammad's alleged military strength from Ma'bad, Abu Sufyan abandoned his plans for an imminent attack on the Muslim community. Through these actions, Muhammad reportedly averted the planned Meccan offensive.

He was trusted by both Muslims and Arab polytheists at the time according to the Muslim scholar Tabari.

== See also ==
- List of battles of Muhammad

== Sources ==
- McDonald, M.V., ed. (1987). The History of al-Ṭabarī, Volume VII: The Foundation of the Community: Muḥammad at Madina, A.D. 622–626. SUNY Series in Near Eastern Studies. Albany, New York: State University of New York Press. ISBN 978-0-88706-344-2.
