= Ibn Masʽud =

Ibn Masʽud may refer to:

- Abdullah ibn Masud, companion of Mohammed
- Urwah ibn Masʽud, semi-legendary Arabic Thaqifi chieftain of Taif, companion of Mohammed
