= Abdo Khal =

Saudi Arabian writer

- Born: 1962 (age 63–64); Saudi Arabia
- Occupation: Novelist Journalist
- Writing career
- Notable work: Throwing Sparks
- Notable awards: International Prize for Arabic Fiction (2010)

Abdo Khal (born 3, August 1962, Al-Mijannah, Jizan, Saudi Arabia) is a Saudi Arabian writer and winner of the 2010 International Prize for Arabic Fiction.

== Biography ==
He left his home village at a young age and currently lives in Jeddah. Before becoming a writer, Khal has been working as a journalist since 1982. His works, written in a distinctive style that blends Qur'anic Arabic with dialectal (specifically Hijazi) Arabic, have made him known within and beyond the Arab world. Khal studied political science before becoming a novelist and his works criticize the corruption of the very wealthy in the Arab world. They are unavailable in his home country. According to himself, this is because they "address the sacrosanct trio of taboos in the Arab world: sex, politics, and religion". Due to Khal winning the International Prize for Arabic Fiction, his works are expected to soon be translated into various languages and become more known outside the Arabic-speaking world. Indeed, some of Khal's work have been translated and published in English, German and French.

== Work ==
Khal works as the Editor-in-chef and a daily columnist of Ukaz newspaper. Moreover, he is member of the Board of Directors of Jeddah Literary Club.

In 2010, Khal won the International Prize for Arabic Fiction for his novel Spewing Sparks as Big as Castles, which is also known as She Throws Sparks. It was published by Al-Jamal Publications.

== Bibliography ==
- Cities Eating Grass
- Immorality
- The Mud
- Death Passes from Here
- Days Don't Hide Anyone
- Barking
- She Throws Sparks
