= Al-Hakam ibn Abi al-As =

Father of caliph Marwan I (died 655/6)

Al-Hakam ibn Abi al-As الحكم بن أبي العاص

Personal details
- Born: Mecca, Hejaz, Arabia
- Died: 655/56
- Spouses: Amina bint Alqama ibn Safwan; Mulayka bint Awfa; Umm Nu'man bint al-Harith ibn Abi Amr; Al-Ba'itha bint Hashim ibn Utba ibn Rabi'a
- Relations: Banu Umayya (clan)
- Children: Uthman al-Azraq; Marwan; Al-Harith; Abd al-Rahman; Yahya; Aban; Habib; Umm al-Banin; others: Ubayd Allah; Salih; Uthman al-Asghar; Amr; Nu'man; Aws; Suhayl; Amr; Yusuf; Umm Aban; Umama; Umm Amr; Umm al-Hakam; Umm Yahya; Zaynab; Umm Shayba; Umm Uthman; Umm Salama; Zaynab
- Parent(s): Abu al-As ibn Umayya (father); Ruqayya bint al-Harith (mother)

Al-Hakam ibn Abi al-As ibn Umayya (Arabic: الحكم بن أبي العاص بن أمية, romanized: al-Ḥakam ibn Abī al-ʿĀṣ ibn Umayya; died 655/56), was the father of the founder of the Marwanid line of the Umayyad dynasty, Marwan I (r. 684–685), and a paternal uncle of Caliph Uthman (r. 644–656). He was known as a staunch opponent of the Islamic prophet Muhammad and was consequently exiled when the latter captured their hometown of Mecca in 630. He was later pardoned by Uthman.

== Life ==
Al-Hakam was the son of Abu al-As ibn Umayya of the Banu Abd Shams and Ruqayya bint al-Harith of the Banu Makhzum, both parents' clans belonging to the Quraysh tribe of Mecca. His paternal grandfather was the progenitor of the Umayyad family.

Al-Hakam staunchly opposed the Islamic prophet Muhammad and was exiled by the latter from Mecca to the nearby town of Taif. According to the history of 9th-century historian al-Tabari, Muhammad later pardoned al-Hakam and he was allowed to return to his hometown. In the history of 9th-century historian al-Yaqubi, al-Hakam was pardoned by his nephew, Caliph Uthman (r. 644–656), after his petitions to return had been rejected by the previous two caliphs, Abu Bakr (r. 632–634) and Umar (r. 634–644). Uthman showed special favor to his kinsmen and he symbolically honored al-Hakam, along with his Umayyad relatives Abu Sufyan and al-Walid ibn Uqba and Banu Hashim elder al-Abbas ibn Abd al-Muttalib, by allowing them to sit on his throne in Medina. Al-Hakam died in 655/56.

== Family ==
Al-Hakam married Amina bint Alqama ibn Safwan al-Kinaniyya after she was divorced by his half-brother, the father of Caliph Uthman Affan ibn Abi al-As. She gave birth to al-Hakam's son, Marwan, who became the Umayyad caliph in 684-685 and the progenitor of all successive Umayyad (Marwanid) caliphs. Al-Hakam fathered at least twenty, but probably over thirty children from four different wives and a number of slave women. Besides Marwan, Amina bint Alqama was the mother of al-Hakam's eldest son, Uthman al-Azraq, al-Harith, Abd al-Rahman, Salih and daughters Umm al-Banin and Zaynab. Along with Marwan, Uthman al-Azraq participated in the defense of Caliph Uthman's house in Medina during its siege by rebels in 656. (Note: A son of Uthman al-Azraq, Abdallah, was a rāwī (narrator) of traditions relating to his uncle, Caliph Marwan I.) Al-Harith had been a key aide of Caliph Uthman and his descendants were favored under the Marwanid line of Umayyad caliphs, holding military and administrative posts. As a testament to the close relations between al-Hakam's family and Caliph Uthman, Marwan and al-Harith were respectively married to the caliph's daughters, Umm Aban and A'isha. Abd al-Rahman was a poet and courtier of the Umayyad caliphs. Umm al-Banin was married to the Umayyad statesman Sa'id ibn al-As and mother of Amr al-Ashdaq, a prince, commander and one-time contender to the caliphate.

Al-Hakam's second wife, Mulayka bint Awfa of the Banu Murra clan of the Ghatafan tribe, was the mother of his sons Yahya, Aban, Uthman al-Asghar, Habib, Amr and daughters Umm Yahya, Zaynab, Umm Shayba, Umm Uthman and Umm Salama. Yahya and his descendants served as provincial governors under the Marwanid caliphs. The daughter of Aban, Umm Aban, was married to Caliph Sulayman ibn Abd al-Malik (r. 715–717) and was mother to his son and appointed successor Ayyub, who predeceased his father. Habib's daughter, Umm Abd Allah, was married to the Marwanid prince Umar ibn al-Walid and was the maternal grandmother of Habib ibn Abd al-Malik al-Qurashi, a general in Umayyad al-Andalus and progenitor of the Habibi family which retained influence there into the 10th century.

His third wife, Umm al-Nu'man bint al-Harith ibn Abi Amr of the Banu Thaqif tribe, gave al-Hakam sons Nu'man, Aws, Suhayl, and Amr, and daughters Umm Aban, Umama, Umm Amr and Umm al-Hakam. His Qurayshite wife, al-Ba'itha bint Hashim ibn Utba ibn Rabi'a of the Banu Abd Shams was the mother of his son Yusuf.

Descendants of Abu al-As ibn Umayya

Umayya
Abu al-As
Affan	al-Hakam	Safiyya (wife of Abu Sufyan)	al-Mughira
Uthman (r. 644–656)	Marwan I (r. 684–685)	Uthman al-Azraq	al-Harith	Abd al-Rahman	Umm al-Banin (wife of Sa'id ibn al-As)	Yahya	Habib	Aban	Mu'awiya
Uthmanids	Marwanids	Abd al-Malik	Abd al-Aziz	Abd al-Wahid	Abdallah	Abu Bakr (son-in-law of Marwan I)	Yusuf	al-Hakam	Umm Hakim (wife of Hisham)	Amina (wife of Hisham)	Umm Abd Allah (wife of Umar ibn al-Walid)	Umm Aban (wife of Sulayman)	A'isha (wife of Marwan I)
Isma'il	Khalid	Sa'id (Khudayna)	Abd Allah	Abd al-Malik	al-Hurr	Ayyub
Salama	Ubaydallah	Yahya	al-Hakam
Safwan
Muhammad
Abd al-Rahman

Horizontal dashed line indicates marriage
Vertical dashed line indicates skipped generation(s)
Descendants of third Rashidun caliph Uthman (r. 644–656)
Marwanid caliphs
Ruling dynasty of Umayyad Caliphate, 684–750

== Bibliography ==
- Ahmed, Asad Q. (2011). The Religious Elite of the Early Islamic Ḥijāz: Five Prosopographical Case Studies. Oxford: University of Oxford Linacre College Unit for Prosopographical Research. ISBN 978-1-900934-13-8.
- Bosworth, C. E. (1982). Medieval Arabic Culture and Administration. London: Variorum. ISBN 978-0-86078-113-4.
- Caetani, Leone; Gabrieli, Giuseppe (1915). Onomasticon Arabicum, Volume 2, A'abil—Abdallah. Rome: Casa Editrice Italiana.
- Caetani, Leone (1918). Annali dell'Islām, Volume 8. Milan: Ulrico Hoepli.
- Donner, Fred (2014). "Was Marwan ibn al-Hakam the First "Real" Muslim". In Savant, Sarah Bowen; de Felipe, Helena (eds.). Genealogy and Knowledge in Muslim Societies: Understanding the Past. Edinburgh University Press. ISBN 978-0-7486-4497-1.
- Humphreys, R. Stephen, ed. (1990). The History of al-Ṭabarī, Volume XV: The Crisis of the Early Caliphate: The Reign of ʿUthmān, A.D. 644–656/A.H. 24–35. SUNY Series in Near Eastern Studies. Albany, New York: State University of New York Press. ISBN 978-0-7914-0154-5.
- Madelung, Wilferd (1997). The Succession to Muhammad: A Study of the Early Caliphate. Cambridge: Cambridge University Press. ISBN 0-521-56181-7.
- Sears, Stuart D. (March 2003). "The Legitimation of al-Hakam b. al-'As: Umayyad Government in Seventh-Century Kirman". Iranian Studies. 36 (1). Taylor & Francis: 5–25. doi:10.1080/021086032000062587. JSTOR 4311489. S2CID 161094119.
- Gordon, Michael (2018). The Works of Ibn Wāḍiḥ al-Yaʿqūbī (Volume 3): An English Translation. Brill. ISBN 978-90-04-35619-1.
- Kilpatrick, Hilary (2010). "ʿUmar ibn ʿAbd al-ʿAzīz, al-Walīd ibn Yazīd and their Kin: Images of the Umayyads in the Kitāb al-Aghānī". In Borrut, Antoine; Cobb, Paul M. (eds.). Umayyad Legacies: Medieval Memories from Syria to Spain. Leiden and Boston: Brill. pp. 63–88. ISBN 9789004184749.
- Marsham, Andrew (2022). "Kinship, Dynasty, and the Umayyads". The Historian of Islam at Work: Essays in Honor of Hugh N. Kennedy. Leiden: Brill. pp. 12–45. ISBN 978-90-04-52523-8.
- Robinson, Chase F. (2004). Empire and Elites after the Muslim Conquest: The Transformation of Northern Mesopotamia. Cambridge University Press. ISBN 0-511-03072-X.
- Robinson, Majied (2020). Marriage in the Tribe of Muhammad: A Statistical Study of Early Arabic Genealogical Literature. Berlin: Walter de Gruyter. ISBN 9783110624168.
- Scales, Peter C. (1994). The Fall of the Caliphate of Córdoba: Berbers and Andalusis in Conflict. Leiden: Brill.
- Sharon, Moshe (June 1966). "An Arabic Inscription from the Time of the Caliph 'Abd al-Malik". Bulletin of the School of Oriental and African Studies. 29 (2): 367–372. doi:10.1017/S0041977X00058900.
- Zetterstéen, K. V. (1960). "ʿAmr b. Saʿīd". In Gibb, H. A. R.; Kramers, J. H.; Lévi-Provençal, E.; Schacht, J.; Lewis, B. & Pellat, Ch. (eds.). The Encyclopaedia of Islam, Second Edition. Volume I: A–B. Leiden: E. J. Brill. pp. 453–454. OCLC 495469456.
