= Battle of Hamra al-Asad =

625 early Muslim-Meccan battle

Invasion of Hamra Al-Assad
- Part of the Muslim–Quraysh War
Date	24 March AD 625 (8 Shawwal, AH 3 (in the ancient intercalated Arabic calendar)
Location	Hamra al-Asad
Result	Muslim victory: Muhammad sets 500 camp fires alight; Muhammad sends spies (2 later killed); 2 Qurayshi soldiers executed

Belligerents
First Islamic State	Quraysh

Commanders and leaders
Muhammad; Abu Bakr; Zubayr ibn al-Awwam; Ma'bad ibn Abi Ma'bad	Abu Sufyan ibn Harb

Strength
700–1,000 infantry, 2–4 cavalry (survivors from Uhud)	3,000 infantry, 200 cavalry (survivors from Uhud)

Casualties and losses
2 spies killed	3 beheaded 3 captured

The Battle of Hamra al-Asad (Arabic: غزوة حمراء الأسد, romanized: Ghazwat Hamrā' al-Asad), was a battle in which the Islamic prophet Muhammad took part. It occurred in AD 625 (AH 3) after the Battle of Uhud, when the Quraysh were returning to Mecca.

In this battle the Meccans wanted to finally exterminate the Muslims after weakening them in Uhud, by preventing their return to Mecca and finishing them off at Medina. Muhammad successfully prevented this. As a result, the Meccans cancelled their attack and decided not to return to Medina. Later, Muhammad was able to get the upper hand over them.

== History ==
After Uhud a state of emergency was declared in Medina. Muhammed feared that since the Quraish had failed to avail anything from their victory they might turn back and attack Medina. On Sunday 8 Shawwal, AH 3 (24 March 625), the day after the battle at Uhud, when the Muslims woke up they heard that Muhammad had called on them to join him in the pursuit of the returning Quraysh army. He gave a general order of mobilisation, with the condition that only those who had participated in the Uhud battle were eligible to participate in the new operation. One Muslim, who missed out the Uhud battle because his father did not let him fight in the Jihad at Uhud, was allowed to join the Muslim army. The son of a martyred soldier sought Muhammad's permission to join in this expedition and was also allowed to take part. Besides them, several wounded fighters also joined the march.

=== Gathering intelligence ===
A little before Muhammad set out in the pursuit of the departing Meccan army, he sent three spies, all belonging to Banu Aslam, to track the departing Meccan army. Two of them met the Meccan army at Hamra al-Asad, about eight miles from Medina. Abu Sufyan had already learned about Muhammad's venture to pursue the Meccans. The two spies heard the discussion among the Quraysh: whether they should go back and finish off the Muslims once and for all or continue their journey to Mecca.

This happened a day before the Meccans arrived at Hamra al-Asad. Prior to their departure from Hamra al-Asad, the Quraysh spotted the two Muslim spies, and caught and killed them, leaving their corpses on the road. Nothing is known about the whereabouts of the third Muslim spy.

=== Camping at Hamra al-Asad ===
The Muslim fighters, under the leadership of Muhammad, went to Hamra al-Asad and found the two dead bodies of the spies. Once Muhammad learned that the Quraysh were not there to attack him further, he decided to spend three nights – or five, according to ibn Sa'd – until Wednesday, (March 25–27, 625) before returning to Medina.

While at Hamra al-Asad, Muhammad made an agreement with Ma'bad ibn Abi Ma'bad at Tihamah, in which Ma'bad pledged not to conceal anything from him. Ma'bad was then sent to Mecca to spread false information. In Mecca, Ma'bad met with Abu Sufyan and spread disinformation that Muhammad had gathered a great force to fight Abu Sufyan. Abu Sufyan and his companions were planning a massive and decisive attack on Medina to finish off the Muslims once and for all. Hearing Ma'bad's talk of the great military strength of Muhammad, Abu Sufyan retreated from his plan of an immediate attack on the Muslims. In this fashion Muhammad successfully managed to prevent the massive onslaught the Meccans were planning.

=== Capturing and beheading Quraysh soldiers ===
After staying at Hamra al-Asad for three days, Muhammad returned to Medina. He captured Abu Azzah al-Jumahi as prisoner. Abu Azzah had previously been one of the prisoners of Badr. Abu Azzah al-Jumahi had been treated kindly by Muhammad after the Battle of Badr, being a poor man with daughters, he had no means to pay ransom, he was released after the Battle of Badr, on the condition that he would not take up arms against Muslims again. But he had broken his promise and participated in the Battle of Uhud. He pleaded for mercy again, but Muhammad ordered him to be killed. Zubayr ibn al-Awwam executed him, and in another version, Asim ibn Thabit. He was an influential poet who used his poetry to mobilise the masses against Muhammad. During the Battle of Uhud he used his poetry again to mobilise the masses against Muhammad. He also accompanied other Arab pagans to the Battle of Uhud. He was captured again and stated "O Muhammad let me free, I was forced to come".

A Meccan spy Mu'awiya ibn al-Mughira, a cousin of Uthman ibn Affan, had been captured after Uhud. Uthman gave him shelter. He was given a grace period of three days and arranged a camel and provisions for his return journey to Mecca. Uthman departed with Muhammad for Hamra-al-Asad, and Muawiyah overstayed his grace. Though he fled by the time the army returned, Muhammad ordered his pursuit and execution. The orders were carried out.

== Significance in Islam ==
The Battle of Hamra al-Asad participation of Abu Bakr and Zubayr ibn al-Awwam were noted by exegesis scholars for the event significance in the religion of Islam, as it is believed that the "wounded pious warriors" depicted in Ali Imran, were intended to be Abu Bakr and Zubayr, two of the Companions of the Prophet who lead the vanguard of this battle, after they receiving injuries from the battle of Uhud.

== See also ==
- Muslim–Quraysh War
- List of expeditions of Muhammad
- Military career of Muhammad
- Amr ibn Hisham

== Appendix ==
=== Bibliography ===
- al-'Asqalani, Ibn Hajar (1500). "Explanation of Fath al-Bari". Islamweb.
- Mubarkpuri, Safi-ur-Rahman (2002). The Sealed Nectar (Biography of the Prophet). Darussalam Publications. ISBN 978-1-59144-071-0.
- Shawqī, Abū Khalīl (2003). Atlas of the Qurʼân: Places, Nations, Landmarks : an Authentic Collection of the Qurʼânic Information with Maps, Tables and Pictures. Darussalam. ISBN 978-9960-897-54-7.
- Khatab, Sayed; Bouma, Gary D. (2007-06-22). Democracy In Islam. Routledge. ISBN 978-1-134-09384-7.
- Gabriel, Richard A. (2007). Muhammad: Islam's First Great General. University of Oklahoma Press. ISBN 978-0-8061-3860-2.
- Rizqullah Ahmad, Mahdi; Maftukhin, Anis; Basyaruddin, Yessi H. M. (2017). Biografi Rasulullah Sebuah Studi Analitis Berdasarkan Sumber-sumber yang Otentik. Qisthi Press. ISBN 9789793715568.
