= Hamra al-Asad =

Location in Saudi Arabia

Hamra al-Asad is a location in Saudi Arabia about eight miles from Medina. The Invasion of Hamra al-Asad took place here on the orders of Muhammad.

== See also ==
- List of battles of Muhammad
