= Expedition of Badr al-Maw'id =

625 military campaign of the early Muslim period

Invasion of Badr
Date	October, AD 625
Location	Badr
Result	Muslim victory: Muhammad successfully occupies Badr and stays for 8 days; Abu Sufyan and his Qurayshi troops flee out of fear

Belligerents
Muslims	Quraysh

Commanders and leaders
Muhammad; Ali ibn Abi Talib	Abu Sufyan ibn Harb

Strength
1,500 fighters and 10 horsemen	2,000 footmen and 50 horsemen

The Expedition of Badr al-Maw'id (Arabic: غزوة بدر الموعد, romanized: Ghazwat Badr al-Maw'id) was the third time the Islamic prophet Muhammad led an expedition in Badr. Modern historians date the event to October 625, though several alternative dates are found in primary sources.

A year after the Battle of Uhud, it was time for Muslims to meet the polytheists and start war again in order to determine which of the two parties was worthy of survival, according to Muslim scholar Safiur Rahman al Mubarakpuri.

The invasion helped the Muslims regain their military reputation, their dignity and managed to impose their presence over the whole of Arabia after the stalemate at the Battle of Uhud. Quran 3:173-176 was reportedly divinely revealed to Muhammad during this event. The event and information about the verses is mentioned in the Sahih Bukhari hadith collection.

== Background ==
According to William Muir, the two opposing forces were to meet again at Badr, and that year there was a great drought, Abu Sufyan the leader of the Meccan forces did not want to fight that season, and wished to defer the fighting to another, more-plentiful season. So Abu Sufyan told a man named Nu'aym from a neutral tribe to give an exaggerated account of the Meccan forces to deter Muhammad. The exaggerated report of Nu'aym scared some of the Muslims, and there was a disinclination to fight. Muhammad rejected this cowardly spirit and declared an oath that he would go to Badr, even if he went alone. Those bold words inspired such confidence that he was able to collect a force double what he had ever had before.

== Invasion ==
According to the Sealed Nectar, Muhammad set out to Badr accompanied by 1500 fighters and 10 mounted horsemen, and with ‘Ali ibn Abi Talib as standard bearer. Abd Allah ibn Rawahah was given authority over Medina during Muhammad's absence. Reaching Badr, the Muslims stayed there waiting for the idolaters to come.

Abu Sufyan’s forces comprised 2000 footmen and 50 horsemen. They reached Mar Az-Zahran, some distance from Mecca, and camped at a water place called Mijannah. Being reluctant, discouraged and extremely terrified of the consequences of the approaching fight, Abu Sufyan turned to his people and began to introduce cowardice-based, flimsy pretexts in order to dissuade his men from going to war, saying:

"O tribe of Quraish! Nothing will improve the condition you are in but a fruitful year — a year during which your animals feed on plants and bushes and give you milk to drink. And I see that this is a rainless year, therefore I am returning now, and I recommend you to return with me." Ibn Hisham 2/209

His army were also possessed of the same fears and apprehensions, for they readily obeyed him without the least hesitation.

The Muslims, who were then at Badr, stayed for eight days waiting for their enemy. They took advantage of their stay by selling goods and earning double as much the price out of it. When the idolaters declined to fight, the balance of powers shifted to rest in favour of the Muslims, who thus regained their military reputation, their dignity and managed to impose their presence over the whole of Arabia.

== Names of invasion ==
This invasion had many names. It has been called ‘Badr the Appointment’, ‘Badr, the Second’, ‘Badr, the Latter’ or ‘Badr Minor’.

== Islamic primary sources ==
=== Quran 3:173-176 ===
Quran 3:173-176 was reportedly divinely revealed to Muhammad during this event. It states:

Those to whom the people said: Surely men have gathered against you, therefore fear them, but this increased their faith, and they said: Allah is sufficient for us and most excellent is the Protector.^{[Quran 3:173]}

And they returned with Grace and bounty from Allah: no harm ever touched them: For they followed the good pleasure of Allah: And Allah is the Lord of bounties unbounded^{[Quran 3:173]}

It is only the Evil One that suggests to you the fear of his votaries: Be ye not afraid of them, but fear Me, if ye have Faith^{[Quran 3:173]}

Let not those grieve thee who rush headlong into Unbelief: Not the least harm will they do to Allah: Allah's plan is that He will give them no portion in the Hereafter, but a severe punishment.

^{[Quran 3:173]}

The commentary of Ibn Abbas on verse 3:173 is as follows:

It was also revealed about them: (Those unto whom men said) said to Nu'aym Ibn Mas'ud al-Ashja'i: (Lo! the people) Abu Sufyan and his men (have gathered against you) at the Lutaymah, the latter being a market near Mecca, (therefore fear them) fear going out to fight them. (But) this only (increased the faith of them) emboldened them even more (and they cried: Allah is sufficient for us!) Allah is sufficient to give victory. (Most Excellent is He in Whom we trust!) our trust is in Allah.
[Tanwîr al-Miqbâs min Tafsîr Ibn ‘Abbâs, on 3:173]

=== Biographical literature ===
This event is mentioned in Ibn Hisham's biography of Muhammad. The Muslim jurist Ibn Qayyim Al-Jawziyya also mentions the event in his biography of Muhammad, Zad al-Ma'ad. Among the modern secondary sources which mention this, include the award winning book, The Sealed Nectar.

=== Hadith literature ===
Muhammad al-Bukhari mentioned in his hadith collection Sahih Bukhari:

'Allah is Sufficient for us and He Is the Best Disposer of affairs," was said by Abraham when he was thrown into the fire; and it was said by Muhammad when they (i.e. hypocrites) said, "A great army is gathering against you, therefore, fear them," but it only increased their faith, and they said: "Allah is Sufficient for us, and He is the Best Disposer (of affairs, for us)." (3.173)Sahih al-Bukhari, 5:59:627

== See also ==
- List of battles of Muhammad
- Military career of Muhammad
- Muslim–Quraysh War
- Battle of Badr
