= Mijannah =

- Village
- Location in Saudi Arabia
- Coordinates: 16°33′15″N 42°0′27″E
- Country: Saudi Arabia
- Province: Jizan Province
- Time zone: UTC+3 (EAT)
  - Summer (DST): UTC+3 (EAT)

Mijannah is a village in Jizan Province, in south-western Saudi Arabia. The Invasion of Badr took place here.

== See also ==
- List of cities and towns in Saudi Arabia
- Regions of Saudi Arabia
- List of battles of Muhammad
