= Ismail Poonawala =

Indian professor of Arabic (born 1937)

Ismail Kurban Husein Poonawala (born January 7, 1937) is an Indian professor of Arabic at the University of California, Los Angeles (UCLA), Department of Near Eastern Languages and Cultures (NELC) of over 30 years. Poonawala was born in 1937 in Godhra, India. He is a specialist in Ismaili studies. Professor Poonawala's formal education includes M.A.s from University of Mumbai and Cairo along with a Ph.D. from UCLA.

== Bibliography ==
- The Pillars of Islam: Volume I: Ibadat: Acts of Devotion and Religious Observances (2002), ISBN 0-19-565535-4.
- The Pillars of Islam: Volume II: Mu'amalat: Laws Pertaining to Human Intercourse (2004), ISBN 978-0-19-568907-5.
