= Umm Habiba =

Muhammad's ninth wife (c. 589/594 – 664)

Umm Habiba Mother of the Believers
- أم حبيبة
- Born: Ramla bint Abi Sufyan c. 589 or 594 CE; Mecca, Hejaz, Arabia (present-day Saudi Arabia)
- Died: 45 AH; c. 664 CE; Medina, Hejaz, Umayyad Caliphate (present-day Saudi Arabia)
- Resting place: Jannat al-Baqi, Medina
- Known for: Ninth wife of Muhammad
- Title: ʾUmm ul-mumineen
- Spouses: Ubayd Allah ibn Jahsh (m. before 615 – until his death around 627); Muhammad (m. 628 – until his death in 632)
- Children: Habibah bint Ubayd Allah
- Parents: Abu Sufyan ibn Harb (father); Safiyyah bint Abi al-As (mother)
- Relatives: Yazid (half-brother); Mu'awiya (half-brother); Uthman (second cousin); Marwan (second cousin)
- Family: Banu Umayya (by birth); Ahl al-Bayt (by marriage)

Ramla bint Abi Sufyan ibn Harb (Arabic: رَمْلَة بِنْت أَبِي سُفْيَان ٱبْن حَرْب, romanized: Ramla bint Abī Sufyān ibn Ḥarb; c. 589 or 594–665), commonly known by her kunya Umm Habiba (Arabic: أُمُّ حَبِيبَة, romanized: Umm Ḥabība), was a wife of Muhammad.

== Early life ==
She was born in circa 589 or 594. She was the daughter of Abu Sufyan ibn Harb and Safiyyah bint Abi al-'As. Abu Sufyan was the chief of the Umayya clan, and she was the daughter of the leader of the whole Quraysh tribe and the most powerful opponent of Muhammad in the period 624–630. However, he later accepted Islam and became a Muslim warrior. The first Umayyad caliph, Muawiyah I, was Ramla's half-brother, and Uthman ibn Affan was her maternal first cousin and paternal second cousin.

== Marriage to Ubayd Allah ibn Jahsh ==
Her first husband was Ubayd Allah ibn Jahsh, a brother of Zaynab bint Jahsh, whom Muhammad also married.

Ubayd-Allah and Ramla were among the first people to accept Islam. In 616, in order to avoid hostilities from Quraish, they both emigrated to Abyssinia (Ethiopia), where she gave birth to Habibah bint Ubayd-Allah.

In Abyssinia, Ubayd-Allah converted to Christianity. He tried to persuade Ramla to do the same, but she held on to Islam. His conversion led to their separation (Ibn Hajar, Al-Isabah, vol. 4, p. 305).

== Marriage to Muhammad ==
Muhammad sent Ramla a proposal of marriage, which arrived on the day she completed her Iddah (widow's waiting period).

The marriage ceremony took place in Abyssinia even though Muhammad was not present. Ramla chose Khalid ibn Said as her legal guardian. The Negus (King) of Abyssinia gave Khalid a dower of 400 dinars and hosted a huge wedding feast after the ceremony. Muhammad did not give a dower larger than this to any of his other wives.

The Negus then arranged to send all thirty of the remaining immigrant Muslims back to Arabia. They travelled to Medina in two boats. Shurahbil ibn Hasana accompanied Ramla on this journey. According to some sources, she married Muhammad one year after the Hijra, though she did not live with him until six years later, when Muhammad was sixty years old and she was thirty-five. Tabari writes that her marriage took place in 7 A.H. (628) when "she was thirty-odd years old."

== Life in Medina ==
On one occasion, Abu Sufyan visited his daughter Ramla in her house in Medina. "As he went to sit on the apostle’s carpet she folded it up so that he could not sit on it. 'My dear daughter,' he said, 'I hardly know if you think that the carpet is too good for me or that I am too good for the carpet!' She replied: 'It is the apostle’s carpet and you are an unclean polytheist. I do not want you to sit on the apostle’s carpet.' 'By God,' he said, 'since you left me you have gone to the bad.'"

Ramla died in the year 45 A.H. (664 or 665 C.E.) during the rule of her half-brother, Muawiyah I. She was buried in the Jannat al-Baqi cemetery next to other wives of Muhammad.

== Legacy ==
The Hadith literature includes about sixty-five hadiths narrated by Ramla. Muhammad al-Bukhari and Muslim ibn al-Hajjaj agreed on two of them, and Muslim took two of them alone.
