= Urwah ibn Masʽud =

Companion of Mohammed

Urwah ibn Masʽud (Arabic: عُرْوَة ٱبْن مَسْعُود, romanized: ʿUrwah ibn Masʿūd) was a Thaqifi chieftain of Taif who became a companion of Muhammad. He was one of the first people from his tribe to accept Islam, and he was killed by his fellow chieftains while preaching Islam in his home city. He was remarked to be like "the companion of Ya-Sin" by the prophet. He was a brother of Barza bint Mas'ud, who married Safwan ibn Umayya.

He was one of the notables of Arabia who entered the negotiations regarding the peace of Hudaybiyah on behalf of Quraysh. He said, "I have visited the kings of Persia, Rome and Abyssinia, but I have not seen any leader more revered and respected by his people than Muhammad. If he ordered them to do anything, they do it without delay. If he performs Ablution (Arabic: وُضُوء, romanized: Wuḍūʾ) they all seek the remainder of the water he used. They never look at him in the eyes, out of respect."

== Personal life ==
By his wife Amina bint Abi Sufyan, he had a son named Dawud, who married his maternal cousin, Habibah bint Ubayd Allah.

== Appearance ==
In a hadith reported in Sahih Muslim, Muhammad mentioned that ʿĪsā (Arabic: عِيسَىٰ, Jesus) resembled ibn Mas'ud closest in appearance. By descriptions of 'Isa attributed to Muhammed, this would indicate a man with moderate complexion and straight hair.

== Death ==
After Urwa became Muslim, he returned to Ta'if and preached about Islam to his people. But his people didn't like that he was Muslim and struck him with arrows.

== See also ==
- Adnanite Arabs
- List of notable Hijazis
- Treaty of Hudaybiyah
