= Habibah bint Ubayd Allah =

Daughter of Ubayd Allah ibn Jahsh and Umm Habiba Ramla bint Abi Sufyan

Habiba bint Ubayd Allah
- حبيبة بنت عبيد الله
- Spouse: Dawud ibn Urwah
- Parents: Umm Habiba; Ubayd Allah ibn Jahsh
- Relatives: List; Aunt(s): Zaynab bint Jahsh; Mariam Umm Al Hakam bint Abi Sufyan; List; Great-grandparent(s): Shaybah ibn Hashim; Abu al-As ibn Umayya; Harb ibn Umayyah; Safiya bint Hazn bin Bjeer

Habiba bint Ubayd Allah (Arabic: حَبِيبَة بِنْت عُبَيْد اللَّه, romanized: Ḥabība bint ʿUbayd Allāh) was the daughter of Ubayd Allah ibn Jahsh and Umm Habiba Ramla bint Abi Sufyan.
