= Safiyya bint Abi al-As =

Daughter of Quraysh chief, Wife of Abu Sufyan, and mother-in-law of The Prophet

Safiyyah bint Abi al-As

Wife of Quraysh chief of Umayya clan
- Succeeded by: Zaynab bint Nawfal; Hind bint Utbah

Personal details
- Born: Mecca, Arabia
- Died: Arabia
- Spouse: Abu Sufyan ibn Harb
- Relations: Affan (older brother); Al-Hakam (brother); Al-Mughira (brother); Arwa (sister)
- Children: Umm Habiba
- Parent: Abu al-As ibn Umayya

Ṣafiyyah bint Abī al-ʿĀṣ (Arabic: صفية بنت أبي العاص) was the daughter of Abu al-As ibn Umayya.

She was a wife of Abu Sufyan ibn Harb (her cousin). She had at least two daughters with him: Ramlah, who would later adopt Islam and marry Muhammad, and Umayna.

== See also ==
- Saffiyah (name)
