= Abu Sufyan =

Quraysh tribal leader and merchant (c. 560 – 653)

Abu Sufyan أَبُو سُفْيَانُ
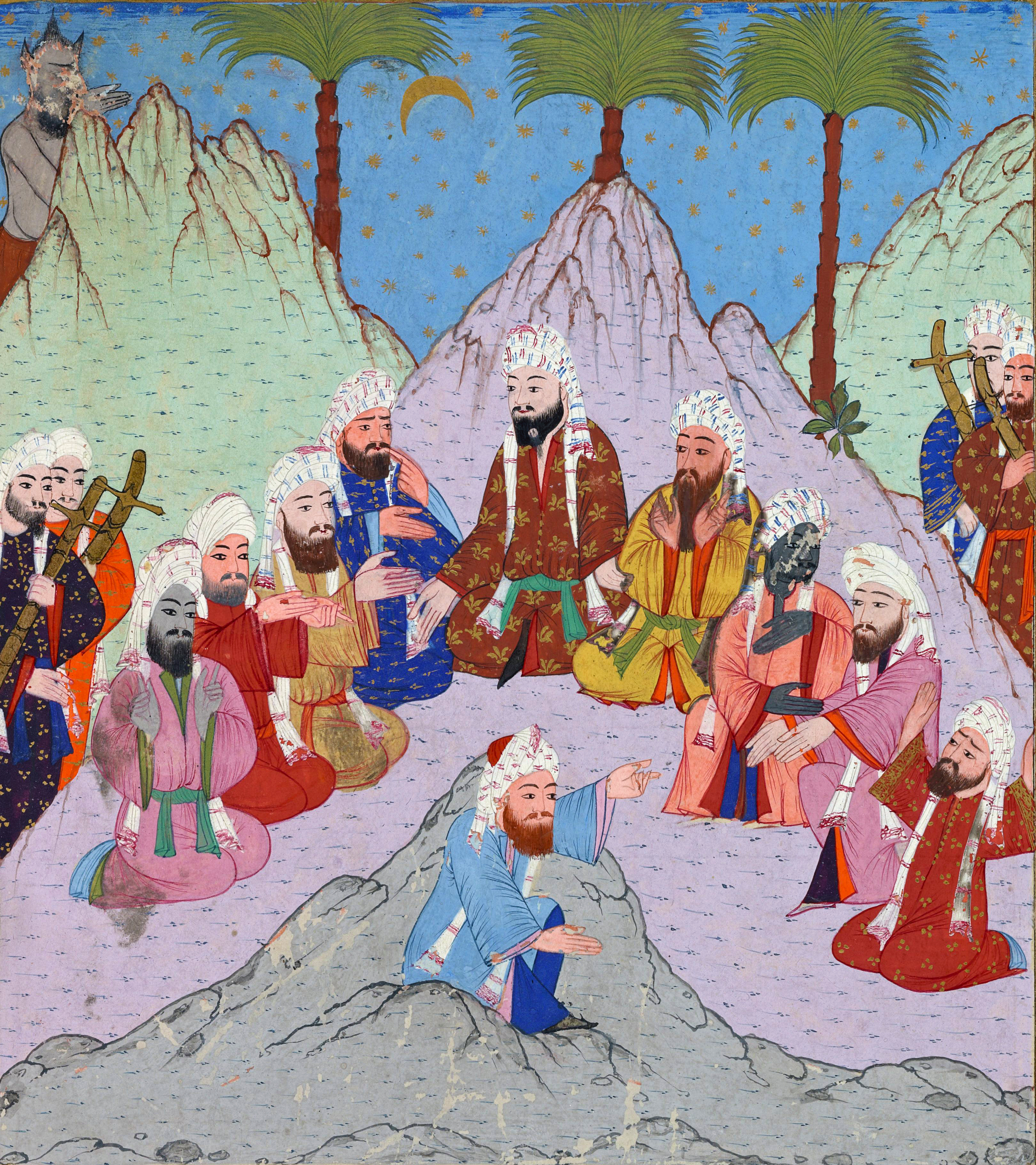
- Abu Sufyan and other Quraysh leaders discussing the second pledge at al-Aqabah being watched over by Iblis and spied on by Abu ʿĀmir al-Rāhib
- Born: Sakhr ibn Harb ibn Umayya c. 560 CE; Mecca, Hijaz, Arabia
- Died: c. 653 (aged 92–93); Medina, Rashidun Caliphate
- Resting place: Al-Baqi Cemetery
- Spouses: Hind bint Utba; Safiyya bint Abi al-As; Zaynab bint Nawfal; (among others)
- Children: Hanzala; Yazid; Mu'awiya; Utba; Maymuna; Amr; Anbasa; Muhammad; Umm Habiba; Juwayriyah
- Father: Harb ibn Umayya
- Military career
- Allegiance: Quraysh (624–630); Muhammad (630–632); Rashidun Caliphate (630–636)
- Service years: c. 624–636
- Conflicts: Against Muslims; Patrol of al-Abwa; Invasion of Sawiq; Battle of Uhud; Battle of Hamra al-Asad; Expedition of Badr al-Maw'id; Battle of the Trench; For Muslims; Battle of Hunayn; Siege of Ta'if; Battle of the Yarmuk

Abu Sufyan (Note: His full birth name was Ṣakhr ibn Ḥarb ibn Umayya (Arabic: صَخْرِ ٱبْن حَرْب ٱبْن أُمَيَّةَ).) (Arabic: أبو سفيان; c. 560–653), was a prominent opponent-turned-companion and father-in-law of the Islamic prophet Muhammad. He was the father of the first Umayyad caliph Mu'awiya I (r. 661–680) and namesake of the Sufyanid line of Umayyad caliphs which ruled from 661 to 684.

Abu Sufyan was a leader and merchant from the Quraysh tribe of Mecca. During his early career, he often led trade caravans to Syria. He had been among the main leaders of Meccan opposition to Muhammad, the prophet of Islam, commanding the Meccans at the battles of the Uhud and Trench in 625 and 627 CE. However, when Muhammad entered Mecca in 630, he was among the first to submit and was given a stake in the nascent Muslim state, playing a role at the Battle of Hunayn and the subsequent destruction of the polytheistic sanctuary of al-Lat in Ta'if. After Muhammad's death, he may have been appointed as the governor of Najran by Caliph Abu Bakr (r. 632–634) for an unspecified period. Abu Sufyan later played a supporting role in the Muslim army at the Battle of the Yarmuk against the Byzantines in Syria. His sons Yazid and later Mu'awiya were given command roles in that province and the latter went on to establish the Umayyad Caliphate in 661.

== Life ==
=== Early life ===
Abu Sufyan's given name was Sakhr and he was born around c. 560 to Harb ibn Umayya, a leader of the Quraysh tribe of Mecca, and Safiyya bint Hazn ibn Bujayr. The family belonged to the Banu Abd Shams clan of the Quraysh, the brother clan of the Banu Hashim, to which the Islamic prophet Muhammad belonged. Abu Sufyan was among the leaders of the Qurayshi opposition to Muhammad in the years preceding the Hijrah (emigration of Muhammad and his followers from Mecca to Medina in 622). A prominent financier and merchant, Abu Sufyan engaged in trade in Syria, often heading Meccan caravans to the region. He owned land in the vicinity of Damascus.

=== Opposition to Islam ===
Abu Sufyan led the Meccan resistance to Muhammad from the Battle of Badr in 624 through to the fall of Mecca in 630, a sustained six-year campaign that included the military expeditions resulting in the Battle of Uhud (625) and the Siege of Medina (627).

In 624, a caravan Abu Sufyan was leading back to Mecca from Syria faced an assault by Muhammad, prompting him to send for aid. In response, a 1,000-strong Meccan army led by Abu Jahl ibn Hisham was dispatched. In the ensuing confrontation, Abu Sufyan, "by skillful and vigorous leadership eluded the Muslims", according to the historian W. Montgomery Watt. However, under Abu Jahl's command, the Meccans pursued a direct confrontation with the Muslims, which resulted in the rout of the Quraysh at the Battle of Badr. One of Abu Sufyan's sons, Hanzala, was killed at Badr and another son, Amr, was taken captive, but released. Among the other Meccan casualties were Abu Jahl himself and Utba ibn Rabi'a, who was one of Abu Sufyan's fathers-in-law. In the aftermath of Badr, Abu Sufyan was charged with avenging Meccan losses, the command he held likely being hereditary. Subsequently, Abu Sufyan inflicted significant losses on the Muslims at the Battle of Uhud in 625, but the Quraysh were generally unsatisfied with the battle's results. Two years later, he led the attempted siege of Medina, but was defeated by the Muslim defenders at the Battle of the Trench, and his morale may have taken a blow at this failure. The command of the Meccan forces were transferred to his Qurayshi rivals, Safwan ibn Umayya, Ikrima ibn Amr and Suhayl ibn Amr.

In later Muslim historical memory, the Banu Abd Shams, the clan of which Abu Sufyan was the dominant figure, were characterized as "irredeemably tainted as the enemies of God and His prophet," their two decades of opposition permanently marking their standing in the Islamic community.

His conversion at the fall of Mecca was widely regarded in later tradition as insincere. According to Ibn Ishaq's Sīra, as transmitted by Ibn Hisham, Abu Sufyan expressed doubt about Muhammad's prophethood on the night before the occupation of Mecca, and converted only after a companion present warned him to "submit and testify that there is no God but Allah and that Muhammad is the apostle of God before you lose your head."

The Pledge of the Tree (bay'at al-riḍwān) at al-Hudaybiya in 628 came to be regarded as the definitive marker separating sincere early Muslims from later converts characterized by later tradition as "hypocritical timeservers," a category in which Abu Sufyan was widely placed. An Abbasid-era decree transmitted by al-Tabari preserves a prophetic tradition in which Muhammad, upon seeing Abu Sufyan riding on an ass with Mu'awiya and Yazid accompanying him, declared: "May God curse the leader, the rider and the driver", with Abu Sufyan identified as the leader.

=== Conversion to Islam ===
Though Abu Sufyan did not participate in the truce negotiations at al-Hudaybiya in 628, he held peace talks with Muhammad in Medina when allies of the Quraysh apparently broke the truce. Information about the results of these talks is unclear, but Watt surmises that Abu Sufyan and Muhammad entered into an understanding of sorts. When Muhammad conquered Mecca in 630, Abu Sufyan played a key role in the city's surrender, being among the first Qurayshi leaders to submit and guaranteeing protection for his partisans. According to Ibn Ishaq's Sira, Abu Sufyan converted under threat. On the night before Muhammad's entry into Mecca, Abu Sufyan was brought before Muhammad, who asked him to recognize his prophethood. When he expressed doubt about Muhammad's prophethood, a companion present told him to "submit and testify that there is no God but Allah and that Muhammad is the apostle of God before you lose your head", after which he declared his conversion.

He fought alongside the Muslims at the Battle of Hunayn against the Banu Thaqif of Ta'if, traditional rivals of Mecca, and the latter's tribal backers from the Hawazin confederation. During this battle, which ended in a decisive Muslim victory, he lost an eye, and was rewarded a relatively high percentage of the spoils to reconcile his heart. Because of his past trade relations with Ta'if, where he also owned property and had kinsmen, Abu Sufyan played a leading role in the dismantlement of the pagan sanctuary of al-Lat in the city.

== Later life and death ==
Abu Sufyan was appointed the governor of Najran, in southern Arabia, either by Muhammad or by the first caliph, Abu Bakr (r. 632–634). He initially opposed the latter's succession of Muhammad as leader of the nascent Muslim state. Abu Sufyan, seeing no hope that a member of the Banu Abd Shams could attain the role, aimed to keep the leadership in the hands of his next closest kinsmen, the Banu Hashim, specifically Ali ibn Abi Talib, a cousin, son-in-law and early supporter of Muhammad. According to the historian Wilferd Madelung, Abu Sufyan, by dint of his chieftainship of the Banu Abd Shams and the generosity he had received from Muhammad, was duty-bound by a tribal code of honor to offer Ali such support, as doing otherwise "would have been shameful". Ali, however, refused his support, citing Abu Sufyan's late conversion to Islam and the potential backlash from the Muslim community should he accept his backing. Sunni historians generally dismiss this episode as propaganda by the Shia traditional sources, which were hostile to the Umayyads, the branch of the Banu Abd Shams to which Abu Sufyan belonged and which ultimately became the ruling family of the Caliphate in 661 until 750.

Abu Bakr ordered the Muslim conquest of the Levant, in which he gave the Banu Abd Shams a stake, despite their early opposition to him, which he sought to allay. Abu Sufyan's son Yazid was ultimately appointed to a leading command role in the conquest. Abu Sufyan was present at the Battle of the Yarmuk, which resulted in a decisive Muslim victory against the Byzantines in Syria. His advanced age at the time renders it unlikely that he actively participated in the battle. According to an account cited by Sayf ibn Umar, he observed the battle alongside unspecified Arab shaykhs (chieftains), and accounts cited by al-Tabari further note that he "exhorted" the Muslim troops. His son Yazid held a command role in the battle and later died in a plague in Palestine in 639. Another of his sons, Mu'awiya, was appointed the governor of Syria by Caliph Umar (r. 634–644). Umar's successor, Uthman (r. 644–656), shared descent with Abu Sufyan from Umayya ibn Abd Shams and was known to show special favor to his kinsmen. To that end, he symbolically honored Abu Sufyan, along with al-Hakam ibn Abi al-As and al-Walid ibn Uqba of the Umayyad line of the Banu Abd Shams, and al-Abbas ibn Abd al-Muttalib of the Banu Hashim, by allowing them to sit on his throne in Medina. Abu Sufyan died in 653 at the age of 88.

== Family and descendants ==
Abu Sufyan had several wives and children.

1. Safiyya bint Abi al-As, the mother of
  1. Ramla (Umm Ḥabība) (She first married Ubayd-Allah ibn Jahsh, by whom she had one daughter, Ḥabība bint Ubayd Allah. After Ubayd Allah's death, she married Muhammad.
  2. Umayma (She first married Huwaytib ibn Abd al-Uzza, by whom she had one son called Abu Sufyan).)
  3. Durrah
  4. Hamnah
2. Zaynab bint Nawfal of the Kinana.
  1. Yazid
3. Hind bint Utba the mother of
  1. Hanzala (killed in the Battle of Badr)
  2. Mu'awiya
  3. Utba (had a son named al-Walid)
  4. Juwayriyah (Her first husband was al-Sayib ibn Abi Hubaysh. Her second husband was Abd al-Rahman ibn al-Harith),
  5. Umm Hakam (She married Abd Allah ibn Uthman al-Thaqafi, by whom she had one son, Abd al-Rahman).
  6. Qurayba.
4. Lubaba bint Abi al-As the mother of
  1. Maymuna (Amina), married Urwa bin Mas'ud al-Thaqafi, and bore him a son, Dawud and a daughter, Layla, who married al-Husayn bin Ali and bore al-Husayn his eldest son, Ali al-Akbar who was martyred in Karbala. Maymuna's second husband was al-Mughira ibn Shu'ba.
  2. Al-Faraa, married Abu Ahmad ibn Jahsh and had two sons, Usama and Abd Allah.
5. Safiya bint Abi Amr ibn Umayya
  1. Amr (taken captive in the Battle of Badr and later released),
  2. Hind (married al-Harith ibn Nawfal, by whom she had six children: Abd Allah, Muhammad al-Akbar, Rabi'a, Abd al-Rahman, Ramla and Umm al-Zubayr),
  3. Sakhra (married Sayyid ibn al-Akhnas and is said to have had children by him).
6. Atiqa bint Abi Udhayhir of the Daws tribe
  1. Anbasa.

Sufyanids

Caliph Uthman (r. 644–656)	Abu Sufyan	Prophet Muhammad
Amr	Hanzala	Yazid	Amr	Mu'awiya I	Anbasa	Utba	Muhammad	Ramla
Ramla	Abd Allah	Yazid I (r. 680–683)	Uthman	Al-Walid	Uthman
Abd al-Malik (r. 685–705)	Atika	Mu'awiya II (r. 683–684)	Khalid	Abd Allah	Abd Allah	Qasim	Yazid	Atika
Yazid II (r. 720–724)	Abd Allah	Harb	Yazid	Ziyad	Muhammad	Umm Yazid	Sulayman (r. 715–717)	Abda	Hisham (r. 724–743)
Al-Walid II (r. 743–744)	Ali	Abu Sufyan	Abu Sufyan	Hashim	Abbas	Yazid
Qasim	Sa'id	Mu'awiya
Uthman

Dashed line indicates marriage
Italicized indicates female
Sufyanid caliphs
Marwanid caliphs
Nominated successors to the caliph
Sufyanid claimants to the caliphate during Abbasid rule

== Bibliography ==
- Donner, Fred M. (1981). The Early Islamic Conquests. Princeton: Princeton University Press. ISBN 9781400847877.
- Guillaume, Alferd (1955). The Life Of Muhammad : A translation of Ishaq's Sirat Rasul Allah. Oxford University Press.
- Madelung, Wilferd (1997). The Succession to Muhammad: A Study of the Early Caliphate. Cambridge: Cambridge University Press. ISBN 0-521-56181-7.
- Poonawala, Ismail, ed. (1990). The History of al-Ṭabarī, Volume IX: The Last Years of the Prophet: The Formation of the State, A.D. 630–632/A.H. 8–11. SUNY Series in Near Eastern Studies. Albany, New York: State University of New York Press. ISBN 978-0-88706-691-7.
- Watt, W. Montgomery (1960). "Abū Sufyān". In Gibb, H. A. R.; Kramers, J. H.; Lévi-Provençal, E.; Schacht, J.; Lewis, B. & Pellat, Ch. (eds.). The Encyclopaedia of Islam, Second Edition. Volume I: A–B. Leiden: E. J. Brill. p. 151. OCLC 495469456.
- Humphreys, R. Stephen (2006). Mu'awiya ibn Abi Sufyan: From Arabia to Empire. Oneworld Publications. ISBN 1-85168-402-6.
- Ibn Sa'd, Muhammad (1995). Kitab at-Tabaqat al-Kabir, Volume VIII: The Woman of Madina. Translated by Aisha Bewley. London: Ta-Ha Publishers. ISBN 978-1-897940-24-2.
- Caskel, Werner (1966). Ğamharat an-nasab: Das genealogische Werk des His̆ām ibn Muḥammad al-Kalbī, Volume II (in German). Leiden: Brill.
- Rosenthal, Franz, ed. (1985). The History of al-Ṭabarī, Volume XXXVIII: The Return of the Caliphate to Baghdad: The Caliphates of al-Muʿtaḍid, al-Muktafī and al-Muqtadir, A.D. 892–915/A.H. 279–302. SUNY Series in Near Eastern Studies. Albany, New York: State University of New York Press. ISBN 978-0-87395-876-9.
- Morony, Michael G., ed. (1987). The History of al-Ṭabarī, Volume XVIII: Between Civil Wars: The Caliphate of Muʿāwiyah, 661–680 A.D./A.H. 40–60. SUNY Series in Near Eastern Studies. Albany, New York: State University of New York Press. ISBN 978-0-87395-933-9.
