= Umar ibn al-Walid =

Umayyad prince, Commander and Amir al-hajj

Umar ibn al-Walid عمر بن الوليد

Governor of Jund al-Urdunn
- In office 706–710s
- Monarch: Al-Walid I

Personal details
- Spouse(s): Umm Abd Allah bint Habib ibn al-Hakam ibn Abi al-As (numerous wives)
- Children: Abd al-Malik; Abd Allah; Isa; Hafs (up to sixty sons)
- Parents: Al-Walid I (father); unnamed woman from the Kinda tribe (mother)
- Relatives: Sulayman (uncle); Hisham (uncle); Maslama (uncle); Habib ibn Abd al-Malik (grandson)
- Occupation: Military governor
- Nickname(s): al-Faḥl, Faḥl Banī Marwān

Military service
- Allegiance: Umayyad Caliphate
- Branch/service: Umayyad army
- Years of service: c. 705–744
- Battles/wars: Arab–Byzantine wars

ʿUmar ibn al-Walīd ibn ʿAbd al-Malik (Arabic: عمر بن الوليد بن عبد الملك) (fl. 705 – c. 744), nicknamed al-Faḥl (Arabic: الفحلlit. 'the Stallion') and Faḥl Banī Marwān (Arabic: فحل بني مروانlit. 'the Stallion of the Marwanids') for his numerous sons (up to sixty), was an Umayyad prince, commander in the Arab–Byzantine wars and the governor of Jund al-Urdunn (military district of the Jordan, centered in Tiberias) during the reign of his father al-Walid I (r. 705–715). He may have patronized the Umayyad desert palaces of Khirbat al-Minya in modern Israel and Qasr Kharana in modern Jordan.

== Life ==
Umar was a son of the Umayyad caliph al-Walid I and one of his umm walads (slave concubines). According to the 14th-century Arabic lexicographer Ibn Manzur, Umar's mother was from the Kinda tribe and a descendant of Hujr Akil al-Murar al-Kindi, first Kindite king. Al-Walid appointed Umar governor of Jund al-Urdunn (the military district of the [River] Jordan; e.g. southern Lebanon, northern Israel and northern Jordan). He was the leader of the Hajj pilgrimage to Mecca in November 707. In 710–711, Umar led an expedition against Byzantine territory alongside his uncle Maslama ibn Abd al-Malik. As governor of Jordan, Umar questioned Peter of Capitolias, who was made a Christian saint, at some point before his adjudication and execution by al-Walid.

Representing the interests of Marwanid (Umayyad ruling house) princes who were negatively affected by Caliph Umar ibn Abd al-Aziz's (r. 717–720) economic policies, which reversed al-Walid's liberal distribution of war spoils among members of the ruling family, Umar wrote a letter to the caliph; in it he accuses the caliph of abandoning his predecessor's policies, accusing them of oppression, and detesting their descendants, to which the caliph responded by alleging the Umayyads abandoned the correct path by misusing public funds, illicitly shedding blood and ruling tyrannically. Umar is recorded by the sources as being in a lawsuit in 738/39 with the future Alid rebel leader Zayd ibn Ali, which was settled by Caliph Hisham ibn Abd al-Malik. He is recorded again having a legal dispute, this time with his cousin, Caliph al-Walid II (r. 743–744), over a slave girl seized by the caliph. According to the historian al-Ya'qubi (d. 897), Umar led the tribes of Jordan against his half-brother, Caliph Yazid III (r. 744–744) during the Third Fitna.

Umar may have patronized the construction of the Khirbat al-Minya palace near the Sea of Galilee, according to Jere Bacharach. Umar is mentioned in numerous Arabic inscriptions found in the Syrian Desert palace of Qasr Kharana in modern Jordan, about 60 kilometers east of Amman. The inscriptions attest to visits by the prince at the beginning of the 8th century. The names of his sons Abd al-Malik and Abd Allah are each mentioned at least once in the inscriptions as well. The palace likely served as a resting place between Syria and Mecca.

== Descendants ==
Umar was dubbed "Faḥl Banī Marwān" meaning "the stallion of the Banu Marwan (the Marwanids)", or "Faḥl Banī Umayya" meaning "the stud of the Banu Umayya (the Umayyads)" for his numerous marriages and his fathering of some sixty sons. Among his wives was Umm Abd Allah bint Habib, a granddaughter of al-Hakam ibn Abi al-As (Umar's paternal great-great-grandfather) with whom he had his son Abd al-Malik.

Abd al-Malik's son Habib escaped the massacre of the Umayyad family at Nahr Abi Futrus in the aftermath of the Abbasid Revolution of 750 and established himself in the Umayyad emirate in al-Andalus (the Iberian Peninsula). There, the founder of the emirate, Habib's distant cousin Abd al-Rahman I, appointed him governor of Toledo and granted him properties around Cordoba, Cabra, Rayyu (Málaga and Archidona) and Porcuna. His descendants were an influential family known as the Habibi clan. Umar's sons Isa and Hafs also relocated to al-Andalus. Descendants of Abd al-Malik and Isa are named by the sources as members of the Umayyad elite in al-Andalus up to the late 10th century.

== Bibliography ==
- Bacharach, Jere L. (1996). Necipoğlu, Gülru (ed.). "Marwanid Umayyad Building Activities: Speculations on Patronage". Muqarnas: An Annual on the Visual Culture of the Islamic World. 13. Brill: 27–44. doi:10.1163/22118993-90000355. ISSN 0732-2992.
- Biesterfeldt, Hinrich; Günther, Sebastian (2018). The Works of Ibn Wāḍiḥ al-Yaʿqūbī (Volume 3): An English Translation. Leiden: Brill. ISBN 978-90-04-35621-4.
- Bisheh, Ghazi (1992). "The Umayyad Monuments Between Muwaqqar and Azraq: Palatial Residences or Caravanserais?". In Kerner, Susanne (ed.). The Near East in Antiquity: German Contributions to the Archaeology of Jordan, Palestine, Syria, Lebanon, and Egypt, Volume 3. Amman: Al-Kutba. pp. 35–41.
- Blankinship, Khalid Yahya (1994). The End of the Jihâd State: The Reign of Hishām ibn ʻAbd al-Malik and the Collapse of the Umayyads. Albany, New York: State University of New York Press. ISBN 978-0-7914-1827-7.
- Crone, Patricia (1980). Slaves on Horses: The Evolution of the Islamic Polity (1980 ed.). Cambridge: Cambridge University Press. ISBN 978-0521229616.
- Hillenbrand, Carole, ed. (1989). The History of al-Ṭabarī, Volume XXVI: The Waning of the Umayyad Caliphate: Prelude to Revolution, A.D. 738–744/A.H. 121–126. SUNY Series in Near Eastern Studies. Albany, New York: State University of New York Press. ISBN 978-0-88706-810-2.
- Hinds, Martin, ed. (1990). The History of al-Ṭabarī, Volume XXIII: The Zenith of the Marwānid House: The Last Years of ʿAbd al-Malik and the Caliphate of al-Walīd, A.D. 700–715/A.H. 81–95. SUNY Series in Near Eastern Studies. Albany, New York: State University of New York Press. ISBN 978-0-88706-721-1.
- Imbert, Frédéric (1998). "Inscriptions et graffiti arabes de jordanie: quelques réflexiones sur l'établissement d'un récent corpus". Quaderni di Studi Arabi (in French). 16: 45–58. JSTOR 25802846.
- Murad, Hasan Qasim (Autumn 1985). "Was 'Umar II "a True Umayyad"?". Islamic Studies. 24 (3): 325–348. JSTOR 20839728.
- Robinson, Majied (2020). Marriage in the Tribe of Muhammad: A Statistical Study of Early Arabic Genealogical Literature. Berlin: Walter de Gruyter. ISBN 9783110624168.
- Sahner, Christian C. (2020). Christian Martyrs Under Islam: Religious Violence and the Making of the Muslim World. Princeton and Oxford: Princeton University Press. ISBN 978-0-691-17910-0.
- Scales, Peter C. (1994). The Fall of the Caliphate of Cordoba: Berbers and Arabs in Conflict. Leiden: E. J. Brill. ISBN 90-04-09868-2.
- Uzquiza Bartolomé, Aránzazu (1992). "La Familia Omeya en al-Andalus". In Marín, Manuela; Jesús, Zanón (eds.). Estudios onomástico-biográficos de Al-Andalus: V (in Spanish). Madrid: Consejo Superior de Investigaciones Científicas. pp. 373–432. ISBN 84-00-07265-0.
- Marsham, Andrew (2022). "Kinship, Dynasty, and the Umayyads". The Historian of Islam at Work: Essays in Honor of Hugh N. Kennedy. Leiden: Brill. pp. 12–45. ISBN 978-90-04-52523-8.
- Uzquiza Bartolomé, Aránzazu (1994). "Otros Linajes Omeyas en al-Andalus". In Marín, Manuela (ed.). Estudios onomástico-biográficos de Al-Andalus: V (in Spanish). Madrid: Consejo Superior de Investigaciones Científicas. pp. 445–462. ISBN 84-00-07415-7.
