= Umayyad invasions of Asia Minor (720–740) =

Military campaigns, 720-740

- Part of the Arab-Byzantine wars
- Map of Byzantine Asia Minor and the Byzantine-Arab frontier c. 780
Date	720–740
Location	Asia minor, Eastern Mediterranean, Armenia
Result	Byzantine victory

Belligerents
Byzantine Empire	Umayyad Caliphate

Commanders and leaders
Leo III the Isaurian Artabasdos; Constantine V Constantine (POW)	Hisham ibn Abd al-Malik Mu'awiya ibn Hisham # Maslama ibn Hisham; Sulayman ibn Hisham; Sa'id ibn Hisham; Abdallah al-Battal †; Al-Walid ibn Hisham; Umar ibn Hubayra al-Abbas ibn al-Walid; Sa'id ibn Abd al-Malik; Uthman ibn Hayyan; Maslama ibn Abd al-Malik al-Malik ibn Shu'ayb †; Abd al-Wahhab ibn Bukht †; Maymun ibn Mihran; Kathir ibn Rabi'a; Abdallah ibn Abi Maryam; Abd al-Rahman ibn Sulayman; Marwan ibn Muhammad; Nafi ibn Abi Ubayda; Al-Ghamr ibn Yazid

Strength
Generally fewer than the Umayyads	Up to 100,000

Casualties and losses
Heavy	Heavy

The Umayyad invasions of Asia Minor, from 720 until the end of the reign of Byzantine Emperor Leo III, were a series of nearly annual campaigns conducted by the Umayyad Caliphate against the Byzantine territories in Asia Minor. Mostly initiated under the leadership of Caliph Hisham ibn Abd al-Malik, these expeditions were conducted by several notable personalities of the Umayyad Al-Thughur, including three of Abd al-Malik's sons Mu'awiya, Maslama and Sulayman ibn Hisham, and occurred both by land and sea. Although the Umayyad invasions continued to have extremely destructive effects, including the sacking of a number of forts and cities, these attacks took place during a period of increasing Byzantine military power over the course of Leo's reign. Consequently, these Umayyad attacks were met with stiffening resistance from the Byzantine thematic and tagmatic forces and had varying outcomes, before culminating in a significant defeat for the caliphate in 740 at the battle of Akroinon.

== Background and strategies used ==
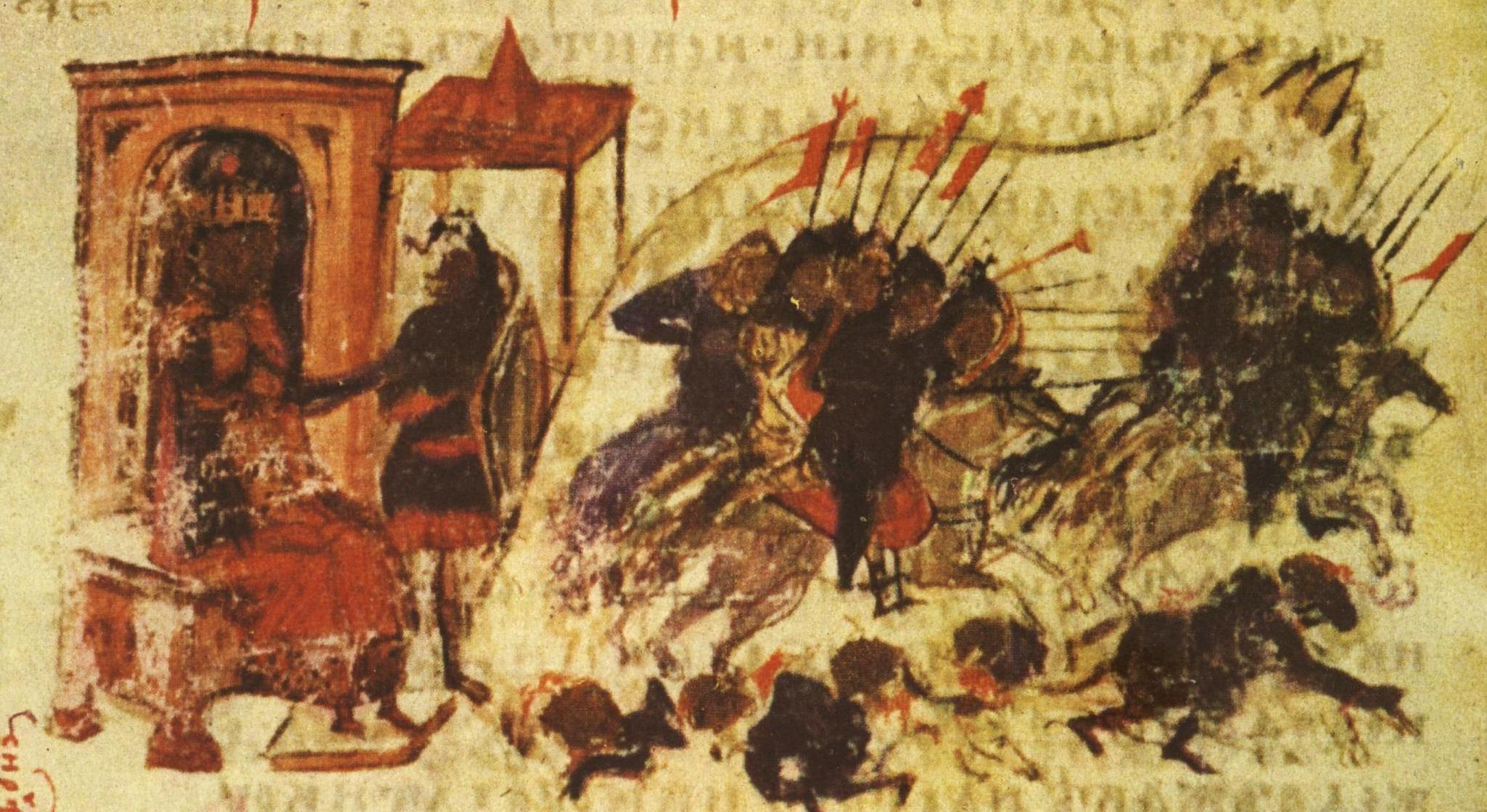
Bulgarian translation of the Manasses Chronicle depicting the second Arab siege of Constantinople

Map of the Al-Awasim, with the major fortresses

For much of the reign of Emperor Leo III, the Byzantine Empire had been in conflict with the Umayyad Caliphate. Although Leo had won a famous victory at Constantinople at the beginning of his reign, the Umayyad attacks into Anatolia did not abate for long. The sawa'if raids were resumed and pursued vigorously by the Umayyads from 720 onwards. These incursions mainly emerged from two directions, with the route into Anatolia from Tarsus being termed "the left" and the route from Upper Mesopotamia via Melitene labelled "the right". When sufficient resources were dedicated to sawa'if campaigns, separate Umayyad armies attacked Asia Minor simultaneously from both the left and right directions to raid a wider area.

By the 740s, the repeated Umayyad attacks into Anatolia, and less frequent Byzantine counterraids, had resulted in populations being resettled increasingly further away from the frontier regions, forming a no man's land between the empire and caliphate, known as the Al-Awasim. The Byzantines steadily adapted their counterstrategies to mitigate the extent of the devastation sawa'if attacks could inflict. Due to the prowess and numbers of Umayyad invasion forces, the Byzantines typically hesitated to meet them in direct battle, and instead relied on a defensive apparatus centred around fortified strongpoints. Leo III adopted a policy of strengthening both the forts near the frontier and the thematic headquarters further into the interior of Anatolia. With sufficient warnings of an enemy advance, these positions could be reinforced with troops, while non-combatant civilians could be evacuated in order to reserve supplies for the garrison during a siege. When sufficiently prepared, these forts and cities acted as force multipliers for outnumbered Byzantine detachments, and the capture of such positions could be a long and difficult endeavour, even for substantial Umayyad armies, which were tied in place to limit the damage they could inflict in other regions. The Byzantines also employed scorched earth methods to frustrate Umayyad attacks. As a result, the Umayyads were gradually forced to travel further into Asia Minor to find lucrative targets to plunder, and overextension could hinder their ability to capture settlements, and potentially make their armies vulnerable to attacks by Byzantine field forces. The fighting between Byzantium and the Caliphate thus assumed the form of a war of attrition.

... as the [Umayyad] raiders were forced to move deeper and deeper into Roman territory, the threat of significant reverse increased. Ultimately, the strategies employed by the Romans and Umayyads saw the conflict descend into ‘a grinding and monotonous pattern in which each side attempted to wear the other down.’

— Crawford 2024, p. 210

== Umayyad attacks continue ==
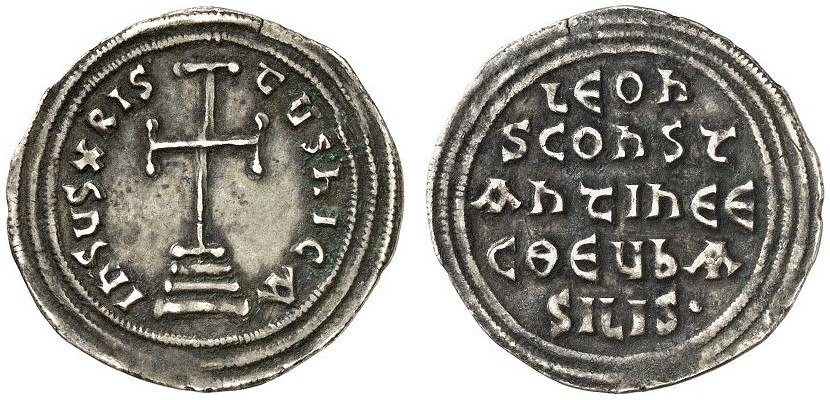
Miliaresion of Emperor Leo III, celebrating the coronation of Constantine V as co-emperor in 720

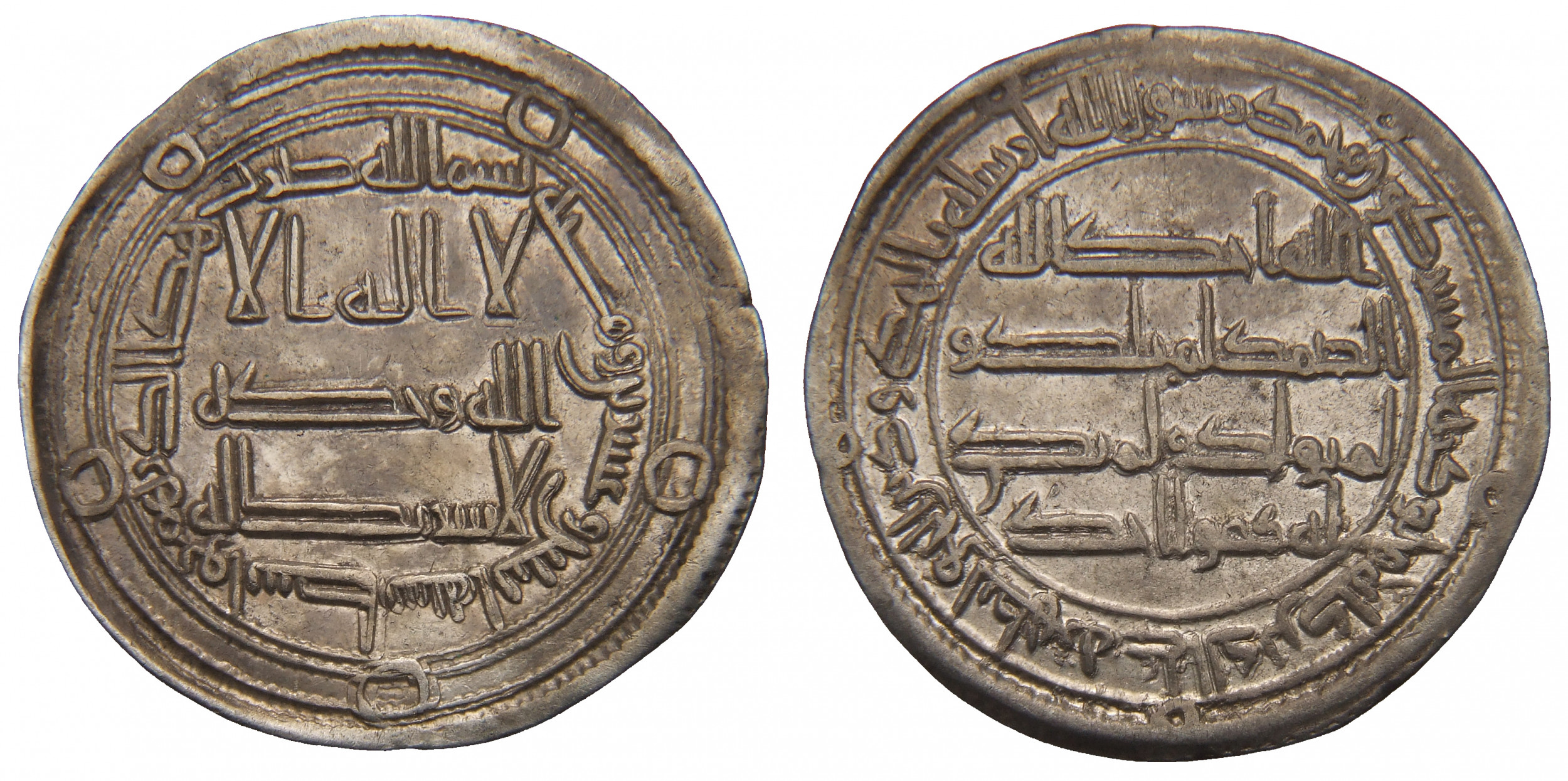
Dirham of Caliph Hisham ibn Abd al-Malik

=== 720–721 ===
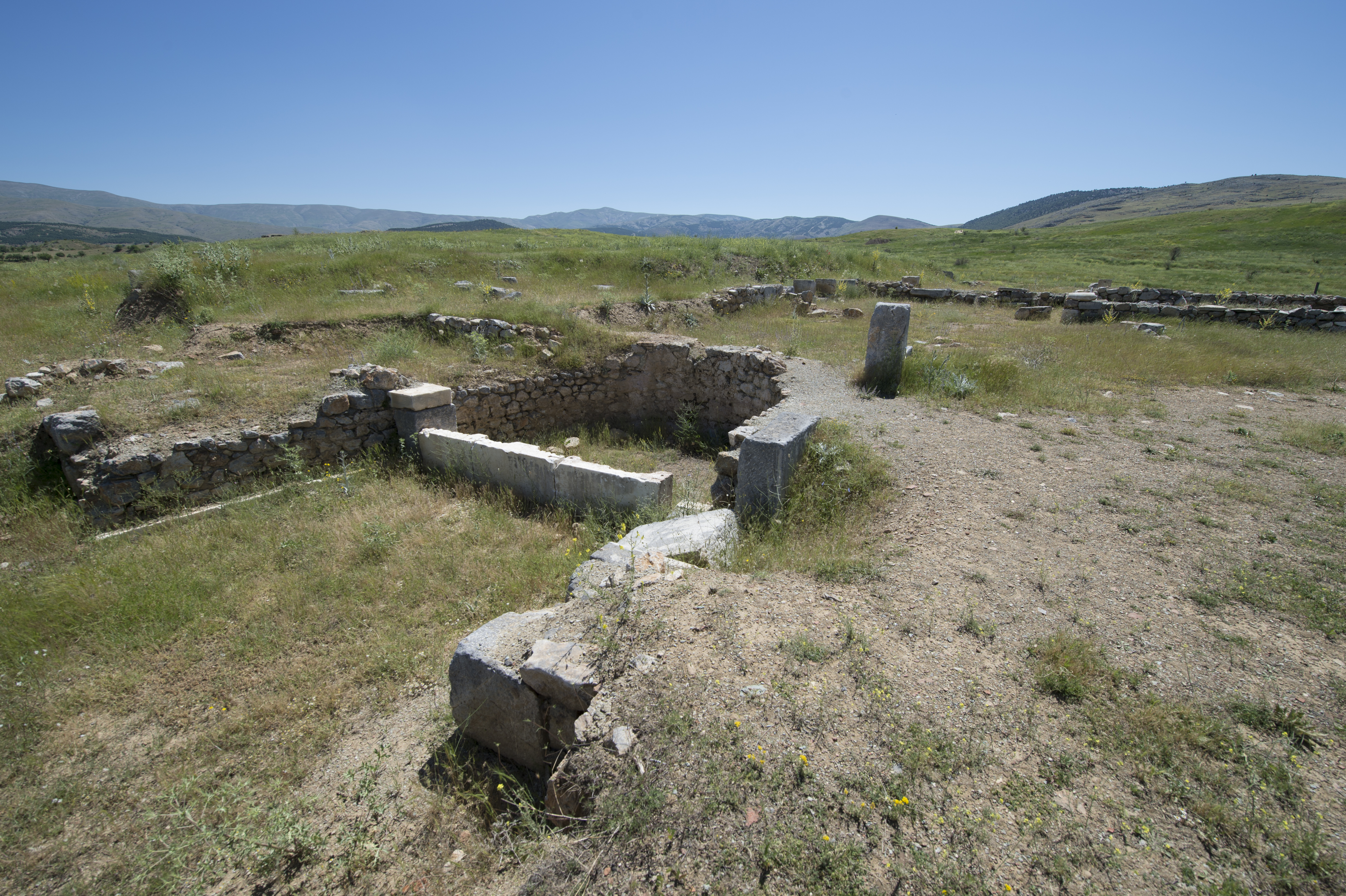
Ruins of the Basilica of Saint Paul in Pisidian Antioch

In 720/21, an Umayyad force under Al-Walid ibn Hisham al-Mu'ayti invaded Byzantine territory and advanced as far west as Pisidian Antioch. The Arabs attacked the city, but the operation ended in failure, with the withdrawal of al-Mu'ayti's forces. An Umayyad incursion into Sophene, led by Umar ibn Hubayra in the same year, achieved some success, gaining a victory in a battle or siege at an unspecified location, taking 700 captives. In 721, an Umayyad force, under al-Abbas ibn al-Walid, attacked Byzantine holdings in western Cilicia. Al-Walid was able to capture Dalisandos, but his own army sustained very heavy casualties before the fort fell. Al-Walid returned to Umayyad territory, having reportedly captured 20,000 people in the course of the campaign.

However, these Umayyad invasions were counteracted by renewed offensive operations launched by the Byzantine navy. In 721, a Byzantine fleet sailed southwards, targeting the economic hub of Umayyad Egypt. This seaborn raid was successful, and the Byzantines devastated significant parts of the coastline.

=== 722–723 ===
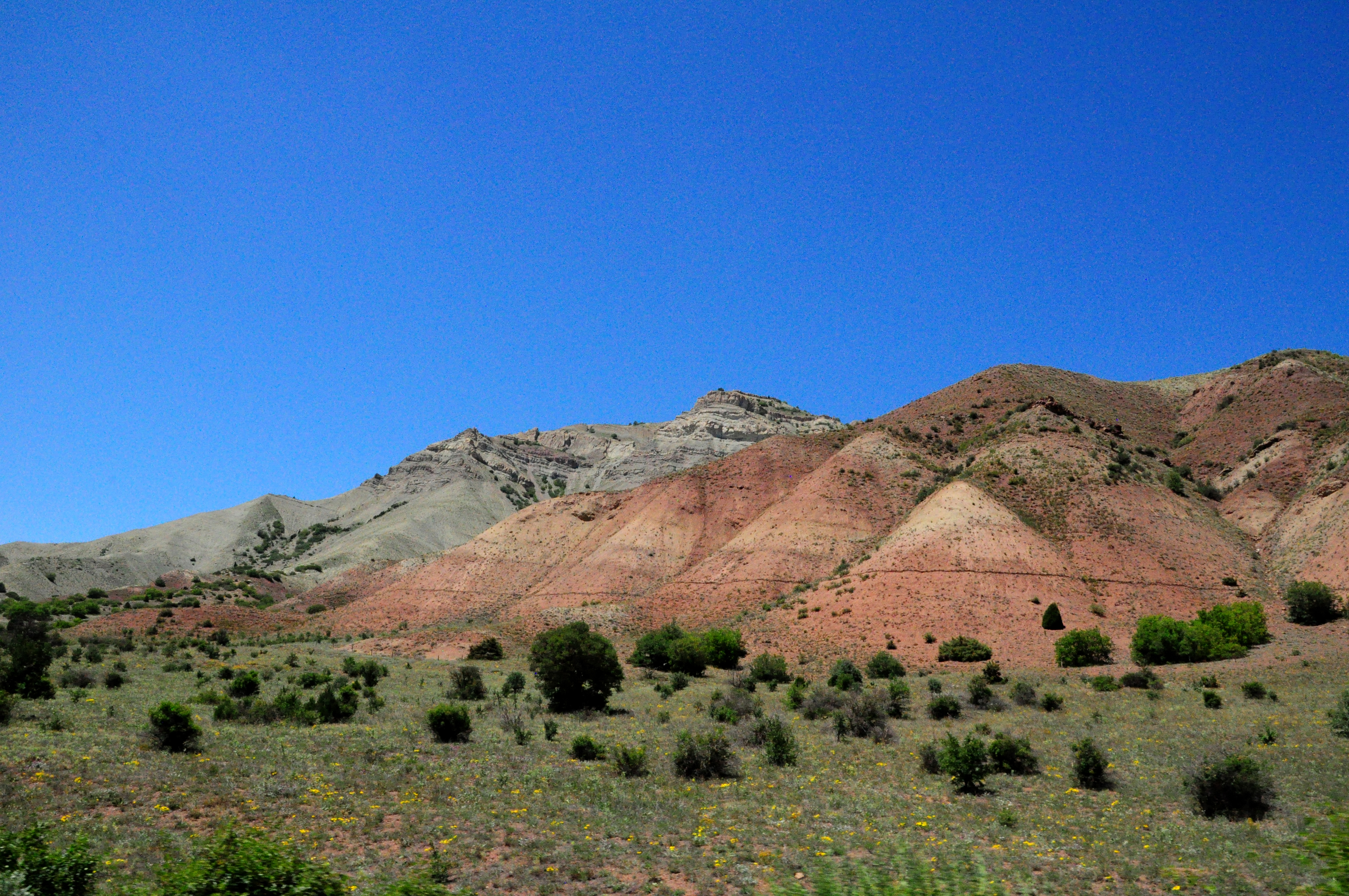
Mountains near the location of Kamacha

In 722, Abd al-Rahman ibn Sulayman led an army into Western Asia Minor, while the former governor of Medina, Uthman ibn Hayyan al-Murri, campaigned near the Byzantine - Umayyad frontier further east. Neither attack had notable achievements. A more successful invasion was conducted by Marwan ibn Muhammad the in the following year of 723. Detailed descriptions by the sources have not survived, but Marwan captured the fortress of Kamacha and then advanced into Cappadocia, where he took the city of Iconium.

=== 724 ===
One of the commanders leading Umayyad incursions in 724 was Sa'id ibn Abd al-Malik. His forces included significant numbers of Syrian troops. His expedition however was met with greater resistance by the Byzantine thematic forces than before. At an unknown location, a Byzantine army won a victory over Abd al-Malik and forced him to withdraw. The Umayyads sustained heavy casualties from this defeat, and during the retreat the Byzantines managed to cut off an Arab detachment under Kathir ibn Rabi'a and annihilated it, though Rabi'a himself was able to escape with a few of his men. This event was followed by an infamous incident, wherein the Byzantines dismembered over 1,000 Umayyad soldiers, likely prisoners taken in the fighting.

Another Umayyad incursion in 724, led by Marwan ibn Muhammad and Sa'id ibn Hisham, was met with more success. The Arabs campaigned against Byzantine frontier defences near Melitene, and struck toward the fort of Nuwasa, a location on the Upper Euphrates. The Umayyads were able to catch the defenders by surprise, before significant numbers of non-combatant civilians could be evacuated from the location. The fortress was successfully stormed and the men of the garrison were massacred, while some women and children within were carried off as spoils of war.

=== 725–726 ===
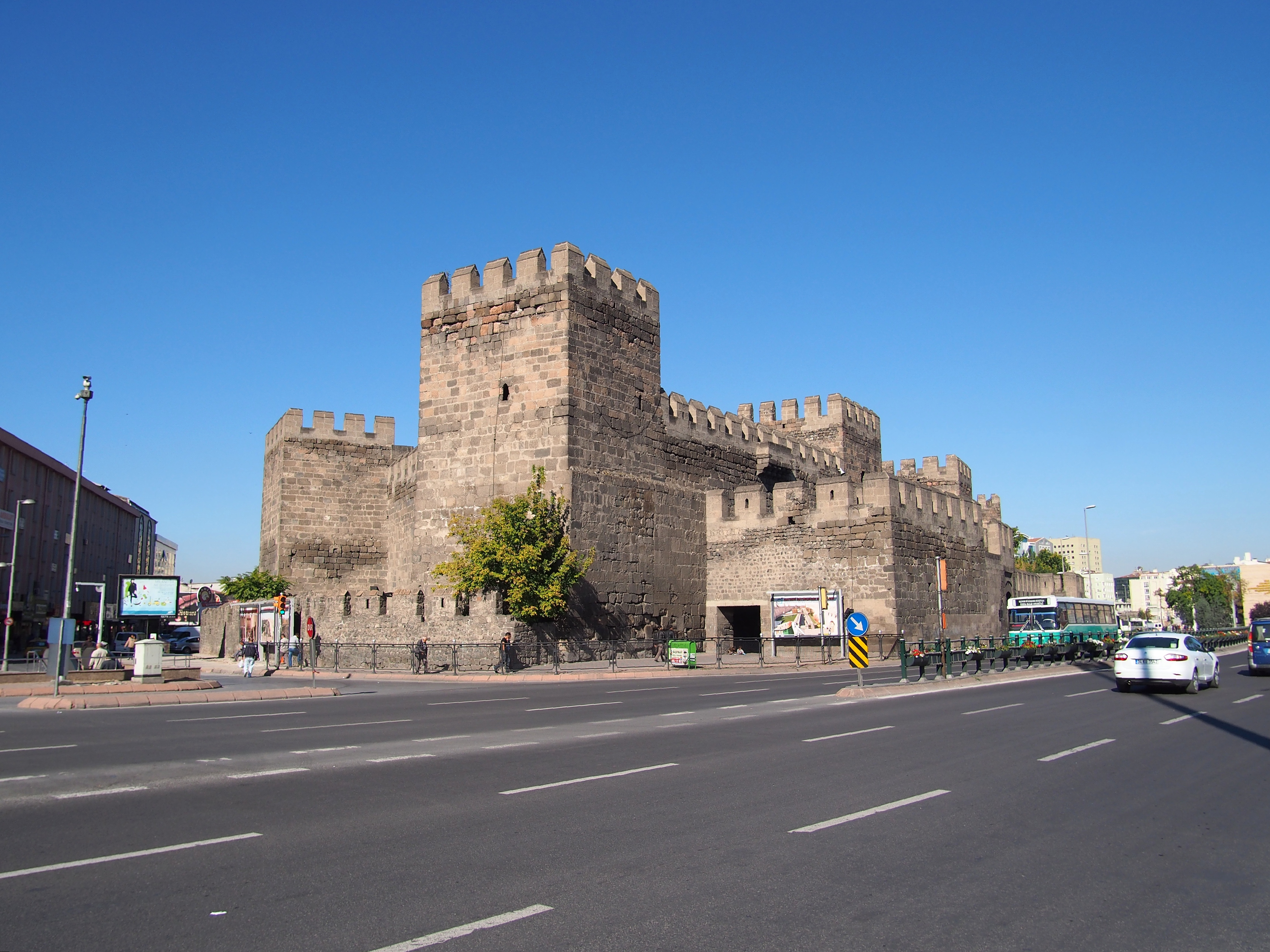
Fortress of Caesarea

The commander of the main Umayyad incursion in 725 was Mu'awiya ibn Hisham, who would go on to lead several subsequent sawa'if raids in the following years. However, his campaign in 725 made little progress, as it was met by scorched earth strategies employed by the Byzantines. They destroyed pastures in advance of the Umayyads, so that the Arabs would have difficulty sustaining the horses and beasts of burden of their army. Umayyad detachments retaliated by spreading out and burning abandoned villages and crop fields in their vicinity, but they inflicted limited damage, and were unable to make strategic headway on this occasion.

An invasion in late 725 brought better results for the Umayyads. Again commanded by Mu'awiya, the Arabs invaded with a large army, including a 4,000-strong detachment of recruits from Hijaz, as well as an elite unit named Waddahiyya. This expedition saw a number of settlements fall to the Arabs, and a column under the command of the veteran Maslama ibn Abd al-Malik even stormed and sacked Caesarea of the Anatolikon Theme on 13 January 726. Umayyad operations in these years were not limited to terrestrial offensives. By the year 726, possibly in response to the Byzantine attack on Egypt in 721, the Umayyads had bolstered the strength of their own navy. Consequently, an Umayyad fleet, under the command of the Jaziran Maymun ibn Mihran, was able to raid Byzantine possessions in Cyprus.

=== 727 ===
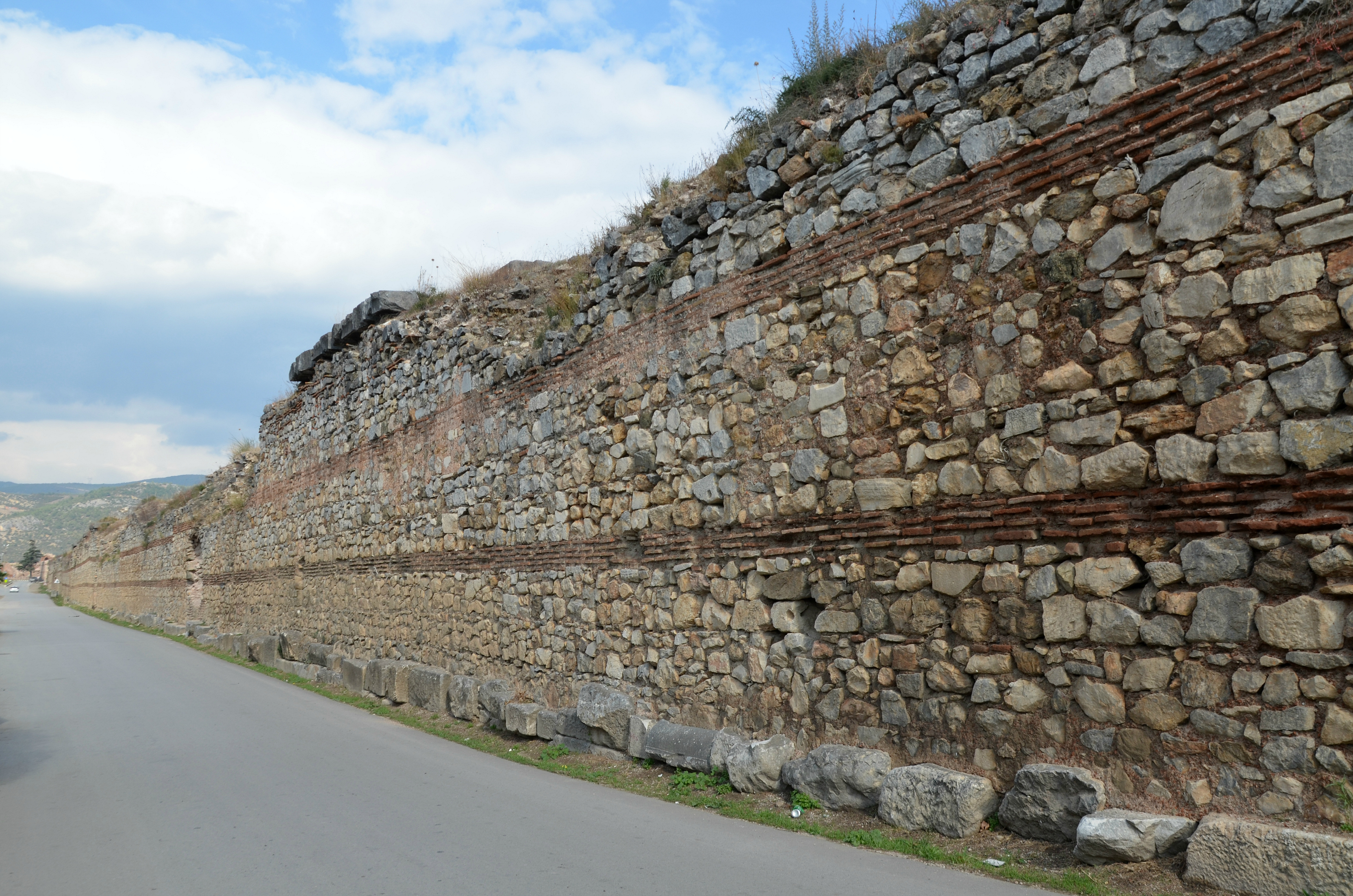
Byzantine fortifications of Nicaea

The Umayyad invasion of Asia Minor in 727 was an ambitious undertaking involving a massive army, and was again led by Mu'awiya ibn Hisham and Abdallah al-Battal. The total strength of the Umayyad force was recorded to be 100,000 strong, and was divided into two columns to engage different targets simultaneously: a vanguard of 15,000 men under al-Battal, and a main body of 85,000 men commanded by Mu'awiya. (Note: Crawford (p.211) considers these figures (recorded by Theophanes) to be too high, but concedes that the army commanded by Mu'awiya in 727 was nonetheless very large) This incursion yielded initial success, as al-Battal conducted a lightning raid into Paphlagonia, where he took the city of Gangra by surprise and sacked it. Al-Battal then turned southwest and advanced towards the headquarters of the Opsikion Theme, Nicaea. The Umayyad vanguard caught the garrison of the city by surprise and blockaded the stronghold. However, al-Battal was not able to capture the settlement immediately, and thus settled for a blockade, while he awaited rendezvous with the main column under Mu'awiya. When Mu'awiya's main body rejoined with al-Battal's column, the unified Umayyad army subjected Nicaea to a full-scale siege. En route to Nicaea, Mu'awiya may have captured the fortress of Ateous (called Tabya in Arabic sources), though this victory appears to have been pyrrhic for the Umayyads, as their main army incurred severe casualties, which may have affected the outcome of the siege.

The two Umayyad commanders invested Nicaea for 40 days with assaults and siege engines, which eventually succeeded in breaching parts of the fortifications. However, the Umayyads could not successfully storm the stronghold despite these efforts. The siege was of such intensity that some of the Nicaeans fled the city across Lake İznik, but the presence of this lake also allowed soldiers and supplies to be sent by boat to reinforce the garrison of the city. Ultimately, the Umayyads were repulsed after sustaining heavy casualties, and broke off their siege at Nicaea. Following this campaign, the Umayyads diverted resources to the Transcaucasus, where Maslama faced mounting attacks by the Khazars.

=== 728–729 ===
Although the Byzantines had achieved a celebrated victory in their defence of Nicaea in 727, Mu'awiya's advances were only temporarily halted. The Umayyad attacks resumed in vigor the following year, with a punitive expedition led by Mu'awiya and Abdallah al-Battal, who advanced against the lands of the Armeniakon Theme in northeastern Asia Minor. The two commanders successfully captured the forts of Semaluos and al-Mawla. Naval operations also continued in 728, with either Abd Allah ibn Uqba al-Fihri or Abd al-Rahman ibn Mu'awiya ibn Hudayj al-Sakuni, conducting a seaborn expedition. The results of these ventures are unknown.

The sons of the caliph conducted a two-front pronged attack into Anatolia in 729, with Arab forces under Sa'id ibn Hisham entering Cappadocia again, while Mu'awiya campaigned in Eastern Anatolia. Sa'id marched as far as Caesarea, which had been captured by Maslama three years earlier. However, the Byzantines had used the time to refortify and restore the defences of the city, and as a result the garrison withstood the Umayyad invasion. Further east, Mu'awiya's expedition may have also faired poorly, though both al-Hisham brothers were able to reach the safety of Umayyad territory following their campaign. Another naval operation accompanied the terrestrial offensives in 729, under the leadership of Abdallah ibn Abi Maryam. The target and result of his attack is not recorded in surviving sources.

=== 730 ===
Mu'awiya was the likely leader of another invasion of Anatolia in 730, although Theophanes the Confessor names Maslama as the commander. The attack was directed toward Charsianon, a fortress in the Anatolic theme, and was successful in capturing it. According to Theophanes, a traitor among the ranks of the men inhabiting Charsianon betrayed the fort to the Arabs and sealed its fate. Charsianon fell at some point in September or October 730, after which the Umayyads directed their attack into Cappadocia where they also destroyed the minor fort of Farandiyya. However, the Umayyads faced setbacks on other frontiers in 730, as the governor of Armenia, Al-Jarrah ibn Abdallah, was defeated and killed, while attempting to repulse a Khazar incursion, at the battle of Marj Ardabil.

== Byzantine defence hardens ==
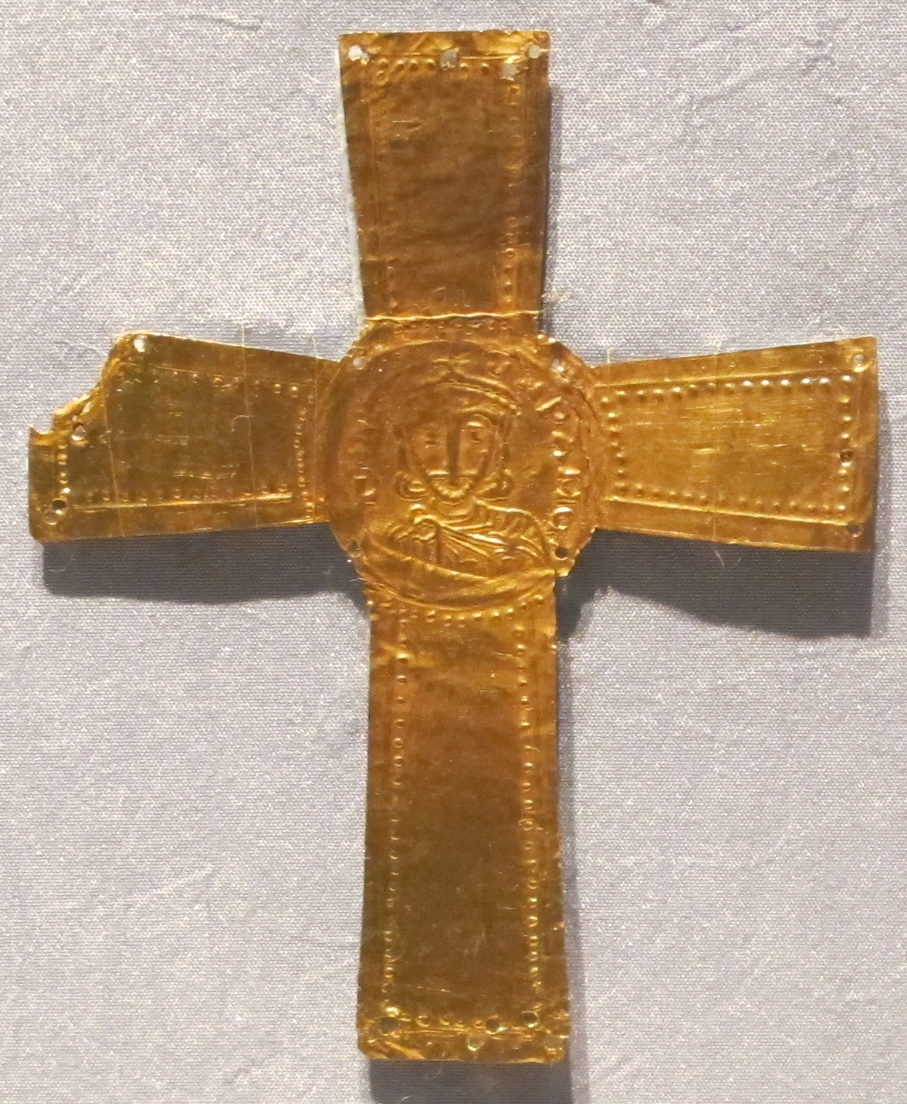
Golden cross with a depiction of a bust of Emperor Leo III at the centre

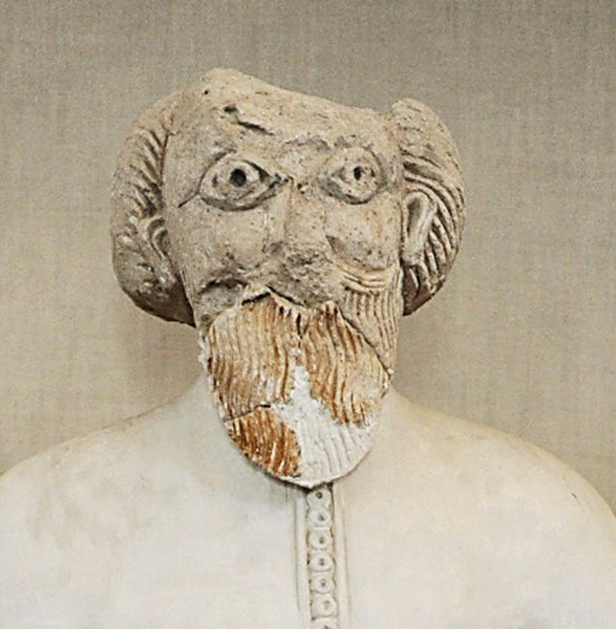
Bust of the standing caliph statue, possibly a depiction of Caliph Hisham ibn Abd al-Malik

=== 731 ===
In 731, the Umayyads prepared an expedition which would be conducted under the command of the frontier warrior Abdallah al-Battal and 'Abd al-Wahhab ibn Bukkt. This campaign initially attained success in piercing deep into Byzantine territory. However, the Umayyad army was then confronted by the Byzantines and brought to battle, in which the Arabs were defeated. After their forces were routed, 'Abd al-Wahhab launched a counterattack to cover the Umayyads' escape, but was killed along with his men.

=== 732 ===
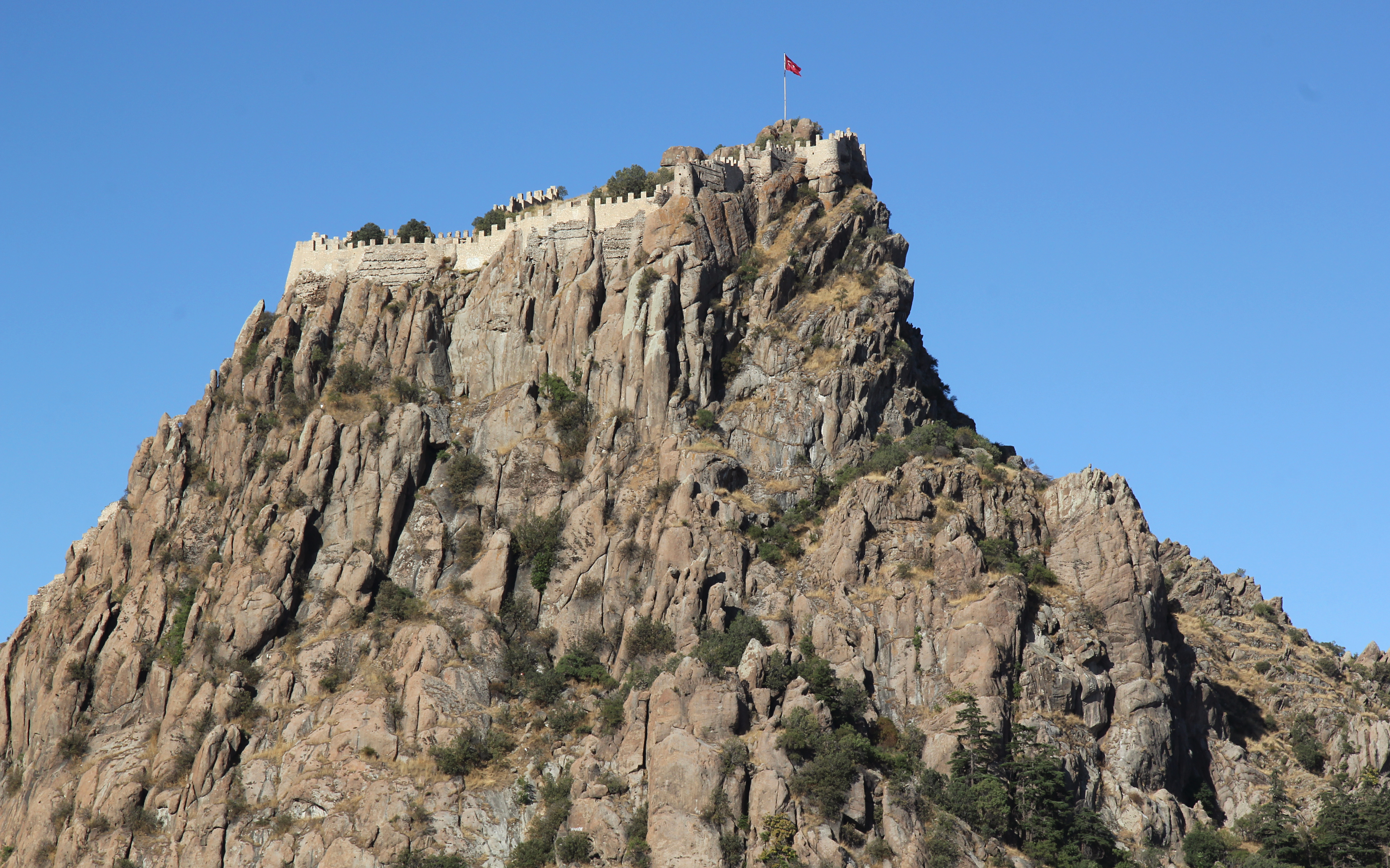
Fortress of Akroinon

The Umayyads renewed their attack in the summer of 732, despite their defeat in the prior year. Al-Battal once again participated, alongside Mu'awiya ibn Hisham. The Arabs advanced as far as Akroinon, where they were engaged by a Byzantine detachment led by a commander named Constantine. This time, the Byzantines sustained a defeat and Constantine was taken prisoner by the Umayyads.

Following their initial success, the Umayyads appear to have suffered a reversal. According to Elijah of Nisibis, the forces of the caliphate split, so that a part of their army returned to Province of Syria with the prisoners, while the other half continued their raid. The army that remained in Anatolia was confronted by another Byzantine army which engaged it in a second battle. This time, the Byzantines defeated the Arabs, partially offsetting the earlier Umayyad victory. (Note: Crawford (p.229) notes that this may be a duplication of Battal's defeat in 731, though it is possible these were separate defeats for the Umayyads over two years) Later in the year, Mu'awiya's brother Sulayman ibn Hisham commanded a summer expedition into Cappadocia. His army reached as far as Caesarea, but attained no lasting success beyond the acquisition of plunder.

=== 733–735 ===
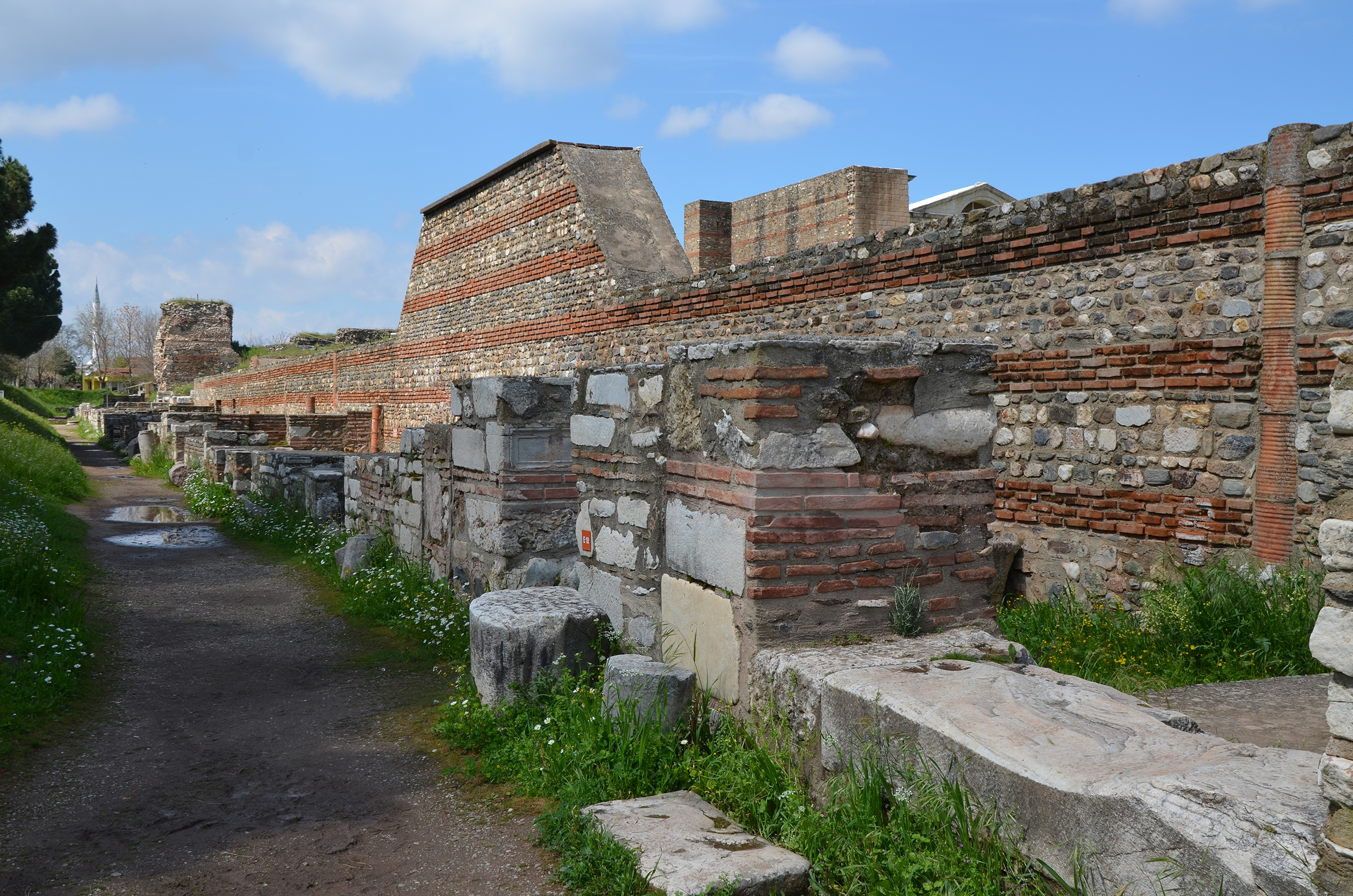
Byzantine ruins of Sardis

In late 733, a raid led by Mu’awiyah advanced as far as Paphlagonia, where he possibly sacked a minor settlement and plundered the region up to the suburbs of Akroinon. (Note: Lilie (p.149) dates this attack to the year 732) In the same year, Leo III pursued an alliance with the Khazar khagan against their common enemy, arranging a marriage between his son, Constantine, and the khagan's daughter, Tzitzak.

Mu'awiya led another attack into Asia Minor in the summer of 734, but had little success. The effectiveness of the Umayyad military operations along the Thughur may have been debilitated by the outbreak of plague in Syria. In 735, the invading Umayyad advanced deep into Byzantine territory, with Mu’awiyah’s column marching as far as Sibora in Pontus, while another detachment reached the vicinity of Sardis in the Thracesian Theme. However, these attacks carried limited strategic impacts. According to historian Peter Crawford, the range of these attacks may reflect the increasing potency of Byzantine fortifications and defensive strategies at the time, as the Umayyad armies were forced to advance ever deeper into Anatolia to find suitable targets for plunder, rather than attempt costly assaults against the strongholds of Eastern Anatolia.

=== 736 ===
In 736, offensives were conducted by the Umayyads against the Byzantines in both in Anatolia and Armenia. Mu'awiya conducted another attack into Anatolia, while his brother Sulayman marched into Armenia. The presence of two caliphal sons indicates the use of significant amounts of resources towards these expeditions. However, neither of these attacks appears to have brought significant strategic gains for the Umayyads.

The Umayyads also intensified their attacks against the Byzantines by sea. Nafi ibn Abi Ubayda ibn Uqba al-Fihri prepared the Egyptian fleet with large numbers of troops, and sailed it to Anatolia, where he besieged an unnamed Byzantine city. However, the resistance of the garrison proved too formidable, and the Umayyads were forced to withdraw. On their return, a greater disaster befell the Umayyads when the Byzantine fleet intercepted and heavily defeated the Arab armada. News of this defeat prompted Caliph Hisham to dismiss the governor of Egypt, who he deemed inadequate in conducting military operations. He was aware of the danger the Byzantine navy posed by exploiting its victory over Uqba al-Fihri to raid the economically vital province of Egypt, and thus sought a militarily capable governor to adequately organise the coastal defences of the province. (Note: Crawford (p.220) dates the Umayyad naval defeat to the following year, 737)

=== 737 ===
The year 737 saw Umayyad attention partially divert from Anatolia in order to confront the Khazars in the Caucasus. The Umayyad governor of Armenia, Marwan ibn Muhammad ibn Marwan, launched an ambitious campaign across the Darial Gorge, which ultimately culminated with an Umayyad victory against the Khazars near the Volga River.

Although these operations partially occupied the Caliphate, other Arab armies remained engaged with the Byzantines, as Mu'awiya led another expedition into Asia minor, raiding Byzantine territory in Cappadocia, and as far as the fortress of Baluniya. Although plunder was collected, his column made no major achievements during the offensive. On his return from, Mu'awiya stopped to undertake a hunt in the wilderness of Eastern Anatolia. However, during this trip he fell from his horse, and the accident proved fatal for the caliph's son. However, Mu'awiya's death may have had a reinvigorating effect on the morale and resources of Umayyad troops in Anatolia, who went on to achieve significant successes in their invasions of 738 and 739.

=== 738 ===
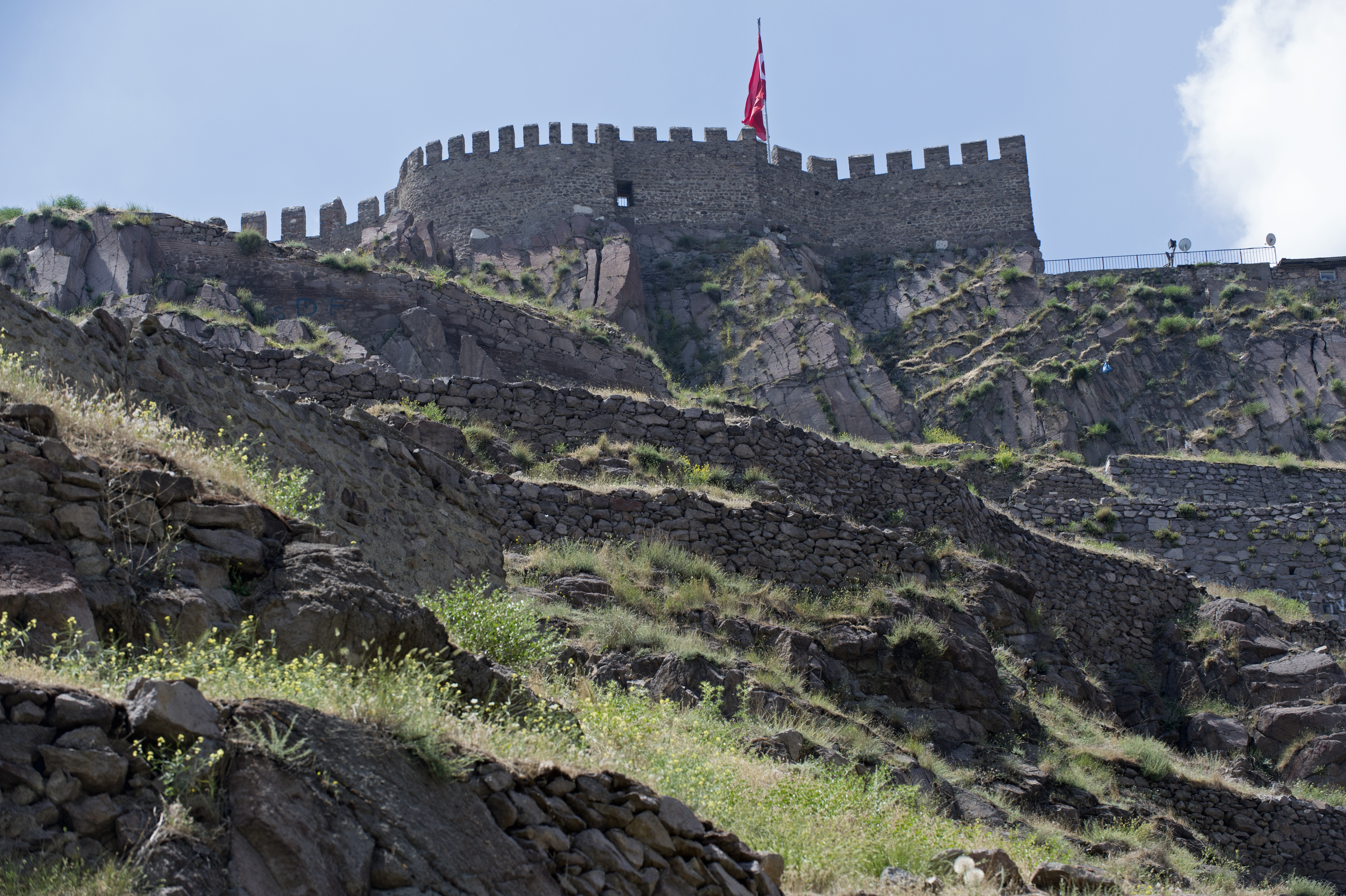
Fortress of Ancyra

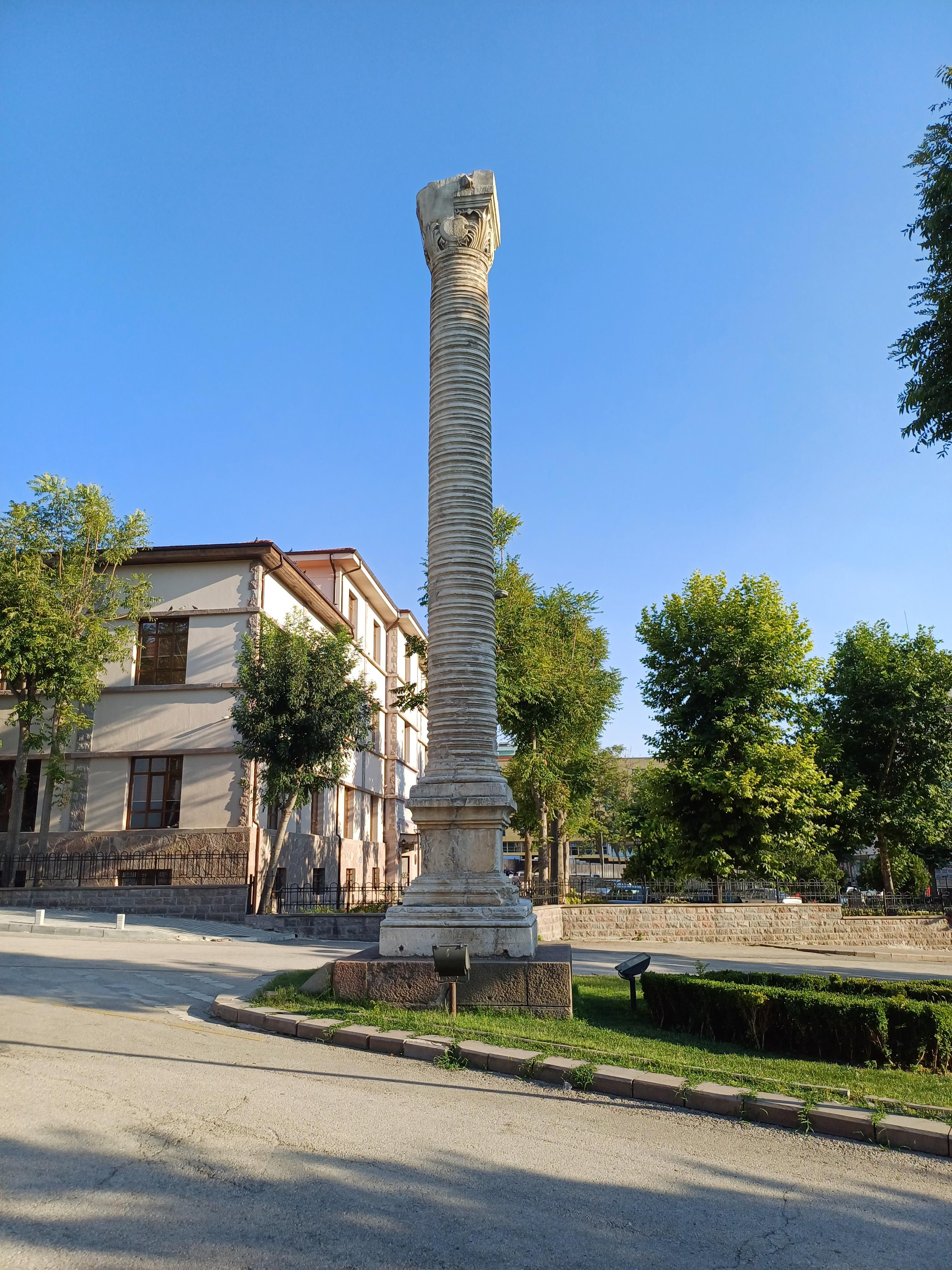
Column of Emperor Julian in Ancyra

Though Mu'awiya died in 737, his brothers, Sulayman and Maslama ibn Hisham, continued the attacks in the following years. In 738, Sulayman conducted a campaign which gained success by capturing the fortress of Sideroun. The Umayyads were able to force the garrison to surrender and took many prisoners from the engagement, including the son of a prominent patrician. Sulayman returned in triumph to Arab territory, with the spoils his army had collected.

Pushing their initiative against Byzantium further, the Umayyads under Maslama conducted a large-scale attack into Anatolia in 739. Maslama invaded Cappadocia and devastated the Byzantine holdings there, before piercing further west into the territory of the Opsikion Theme. There, he captured and sacked the city of Ancyra.

=== 740 ===
The Umayyad Caliphate and the Byzantine Empire, c. 740

In 740, likely encouraged by the relative success of the Umayyad invasions of 738 and 739, Caliph Hisham placed his son Sulayman in overall command of a major expedition into Anatolia, which according to the chronicle of Theophanes the Confessor, totalled 90,000 men. This army was divided into three columns, with the force of 10,000 lightly armed men, under al-Ghamr ibn Yazid, sent to raid the western coast of Anatolia, and the 20,000 force, under Abdallah al-Battal and al-Malik ibn Su'aib, sent to follow after, towards Akroinon. The main force of around 60,000 men, under Sulayman himself, entered Cappadocia and advanced toward the fortress of Tyana. Sulayman besieged the city, but ultimately failed to capture it, and thus withdrew after raiding the countryside. However, the column under Al-Battal suffered a crushing defeat at the battle of Akroinon, with most of its soldiers falling, along with both of its commanders.

== Result ==
Byzantine Asia Minor was witness to a largely uninterrupted series of Umayyad raids from 720 until the Death of Leo III. These attacks continued to inflict significant damage and has sometimes achieved notable successes with the capture of strategic cities. Nevertheless, as Byzantine defences stiffened, particularly from 731 onward, such successes by the Umayyads became gradually less frequent while the Arabs witnessed increasing numbers of checks and defeats during their forays into Anatolia. The Byzantine Navy also rebounded at this era, particularly following the devastating maritime defeat it inflicted upon the Umayyads in 736. Although the period between 720-740 had seen continuous and often highly destructive raiding by the Umayyads, the defence in depth strategies executed by Leo III and his strategoi slowly but surely mitigated the impact of Umayyad incursions. Ultimately, the sack of Ancyra in 739 was to be the final significant success won by the Caliphate against Byzantines during the Umayyad era, although less impactful Umayyad incursions continued until 744. As the capabilities of the fortified strongpoints increased and Umayyad forces extended themselves further into Anatolia in search of bountiful targets, stretching their lines of communication. Combined with mounting Umayyad failures both in Anatolia and on other frontiers in the 730s, these factors gave Leo III the confidence to confront and heavily defeat an Arab army in person in 740, a year prior to his own passing.

Overall, the Romano-Umayyad contest during Leo III’s reign must be seen as up-and-down for both sides. In the grand scheme of things, it reminds the historian of the Romano-Persian conflicts of old – significant resources expended with little to show for it as there was no appreciable change in the frontier. As the state on the offensive, this must see the period labelled as one of ultimate but not on-going failure for the Umayyad caliphate.

— Crawford 2024, p. 227

== Aftermath ==
The losses sustained by the Umayyads at Akroinon, as well as in conflicts on other frontiers like India and the Berber revolt, had strained the military capabilities of the caliphate. Though, the Umayyads remained militarily powerful and within a year of his unsuccessful campaign of 740, Sulayman ibn Hisham prepared to conduct another major attack into Asia Minor. This invasion would be launched in the summer of 741, around the time of Leo III's death or shortly after.

== List of major engagements ==
The table below lists some of the notable battles and sieges fought between the Byzantine Empire and Umayyad Caliphate from 720–740, in Asia Minor and the Eastern Mediterranean.

Byzantine victory	Umayyad victory

Year	Aggressor	Location	Commander	Details
721	Umayyads	Dalisandos in Western Cilicia	al-Abbas ibn al-Walid	Umayyads capture the fortress of Dalisandos but sustain heavy losses during the attack
721	Byzantines	Egyptian coast	al-Abbas ibn al-Walid	Byzantine navy devastates a significant part of the coastline of Umayyad Egypt
723	Umayyads	Iconium in Cappadocia	Marwan ibn Muhammad	Umayyads forces successfully attack the fortress of Iconium
724	Umayyads	Asia Minor	Sa'id ibn Abd al-Malik; Kathir ibn Rabi'a	Byzantines defeat Sa'id ibn Abd al-Malik's army, which sustained heavy losses, including the near-destruction of Kathir ibn Rabi'a's unit
726	Umayyads	Caesarea in Cappadocia	Maslama ibn Abd al-Malik; Mu'awiya ibn Hisham	Umayyads successfully storm Caesarea on 13 January 726
727	Umayyads	Gangra in Paphlagonia	Abdallah al-Battal	Abdallah al-Battal's leads a rapid advance into Paphlagonia and captures Gangra
727	Umayyads	Nicaea in Bithynia	Mu'awiya ibn Hisham; Abdallah al-Battal	Byzantines repulse the combined Umayyad invasion force attacking Nicaea
729	Umayyads	Caesarea in Cappadocia	Sa'id ibn Hisham	The Umayyad invasion fails to capture Caesarea a second time
730	Umayyads	Charsianon in Cappadocia	Mu'awiya ibn Hisham	Mu'awiya ibn Hisham captures Charsianon in September or October 730, likely with assistance from Byzantine turncoats
731	Umayyads	Asia Minor	Abdallah al-Battal; Abd al-Wahhab ibn Bukkt †	Umayyad armies under Abdallah al-Battal and Abd al-Wahhab ibn Bukkt are defeated in battle by Byzantine forces, with Abd al-Wahhab falling in the encounter
732	Umayyads	Akroinon in Phrygia	Abdallah al-Battal; Mu'awiya ibn Hisham	Umayyad armies under Abdallah al-Battal and Mu'awiya ibn Hisham engage and defeat a Byzantine force at Akroinon, taking prisoner a captain named Constantine
732	Umayyads	Asia Minor	Unknown (possibly Abdallah al-Battal)	Byzantines defeat a raiding Umayyad column after the division of Arab invasion forces in 732
736	Byzantines	Eastern Mediterranean	Nafi ibn Abi Ubayda ibn Uqba al-Fihri	A large Umayyad naval expedition is engaged and heavily defeated by a Byzantine fleet
739	Umayyads	Ancyra in Galatia	Maslama ibn Hisham	Umayyads sack Ancyra
740	Umayyads	Tyana in Cappadocia	Sulayman ibn Hisham	Byzantine garrison of Tyana withstands an Umayyad siege
740	Umayyads	Akroinon in Phrygia	Abdallah al-Battal † al-Malik ibn Shu'ayb †	Umayyad army destroyed

== Bibliography ==
- Blankinship, Khalid Yahya (1994). The End of the Jihâd State: The Reign of Hishām ibn ʻAbd al-Malik and the Collapse of the Umayyads. Albany, New York: State University of New York Press. ISBN 978-0-7914-1827-7.
- Crawford, Peter (2024). Emperor Leo III the Isaurian Imperial Saviour, Christian Icon Breaker?. Pen & Sword History. ISBN 978 1 39907 284 7.
- Kaegi, Walter E. (2010). "Confronting Islam: Emperors Versus Caliphs (641–c. 850)". In Shepherd, Jonathan (ed.). The Cambridge History of the Byzantine Empire c.500–1492. Cambridge University Press.
- Kaldellis, Anthony (2023). The New Roman Empire: A History of Byzantium. Oxford University Press. ISBN 978-0197549322.
- Lilie, Ralph-Johannes (1976). Die byzantinische Reaktion auf die Ausbreitung der Araber. Studien zur Strukturwandlung des byzantinischen Staates im 7. und 8. Jhd [The Byzantine Response to the Spread of the Arabs. Studies on the structural change of the Byzantine state in the 7th and 8th centuries] (in German). Munich: Institut für Byzantinistik und Neugriechische Philologie der Universität München. OCLC 797598069.
- McMahon, Lucas (2015). The past and future of De Velitatione Bellica and Byzantine Guerrilla Warfare (PDF). Budapest, Hungary: Central European University.
- Treadgold, Warren (1997). A History of the Byzantine State and Society. Stanford, California: Stanford University Press. ISBN 978-0804779371.
