= Battle of Akroinon (732) =

- Part of the Arab–Byzantine wars
- Map of Anatolia (Asia Minor) c. 740 AD. Akroinon is located at the center of the western edge of the central Anatolian plateau
Date	Summer 732
Location	Akroinon, (present-day Afyon, Turkey)
Result	Umayyad victory

Belligerents
Umayyad Caliphate	Byzantine Empire

Commanders and leaders
Mu'awiya ibn Hisham; Abdallah al-Battal	Constantine (POW)

Casualties and losses
Unknown	Heavy

The Battle of Akroinon was a military engagement between the Umayyads and the Byzantines in the environs of Akroinon. The Umayyads raided Akroinon and defeated a Byzantine force that tried to intercept them.

== Background ==
Despite the Umayyads' failure at besieging Nicaea in 727, their raids into Anatolia did not stop. In 728, the Umayyad general Mu'awiya ibn Hisham captured the Byzantine fortresses of Semalouos and Al-Mawa in the Armeniac theme. In 729, Sa'id ibn Hisham raided as far as Caesarea Cappadocia. The Umayyads rebuilt their navy after the failure at Constantinople, though no exploits are recorded. In 730, Mu'awiyah took the fortress of Charsianon and burned a fort called Farandiyaa in the Melitene region. However, in the year 731, the Umayyads launched a campaign that, led by Abdallah al-Battal and 'Abd al-Wahhab ibn Bukkt, penetrated Byzantine territory, but the Arabs were defeated and 'Abd al-Wahhab was killed.

== Battle ==
Determined to avenge this defeat, the Umayyads under Mu'awiya and al-Battal struck more deeply into Anatolia in the summer of the year 732. The Umayyad army penetrated as far as Akroinon in the west of Anatolia. The objectives of this campaign are unknown. Seeing the Arabs raiding this far to inflict another defeat, the Byzantine army led by a certain general called Constantine attempted to intercept the Umayyads. However, Al-Battal inflicted defeat on them and even captured Constantine himself as a prisoner. According to the Syrian historian Elijah of Nisibis, the Arab forces split; Mu'awiya returned to Syria with the prisoners, while Al-Battal continued the campaign and clashed once more with the Byzantine troops, who this time turned the tables and defeated the invaders. However, historian Peter Crawford argues that this could be a misinterpretation of Al-Battal's defeat in the previous year.

== Sources ==
- Peter Crawford (2024), Emperor Leo III the Isaurian. Imperial Saviour, Christian Icon Breaker?
- Khalid Yahya Blankinship (1994), The End of the Jihâd State. The Reign of Hishām Ibn ʻAbd Al-Malik and the Collapse of the Umayyads.
- R.-J. Lilie (1976), The Byzantine Reaction to the Expansion of the Arabs (In German).
