= Umayyad invasion of Asia Minor (741) =

Military campaigns, 741

- Part of the Arab–Byzantine wars
- Map of Byzantine Asia Minor and the Byzantine–Arab frontier c. 780
Date	Summer 741
Location	Asia Minor, Melitene
Result	Byzantine victory

Belligerents
Byzantine Empire	Umayyad Caliphate

Commanders and leaders
Leo III the Isaurian # Constantine V	Hisham ibn Abd al-Malik; Sulayman ibn Hisham

Strength
20,000	Fewer than 90,000

Casualties and losses
Unknown	Very Heavy

The Umayyad invasion of Asia Minor in 741 was the last major Arab offensive, and one of the final attacks into Byzantine Asia Minor altogether, during the age of the Umayyad Caliphate. Continually weakened by plague, scorched earth strategies, and attacks by the Byzantine forces, the invasion ultimately ended in failure with severe losses for the Umayyads.

== Background ==
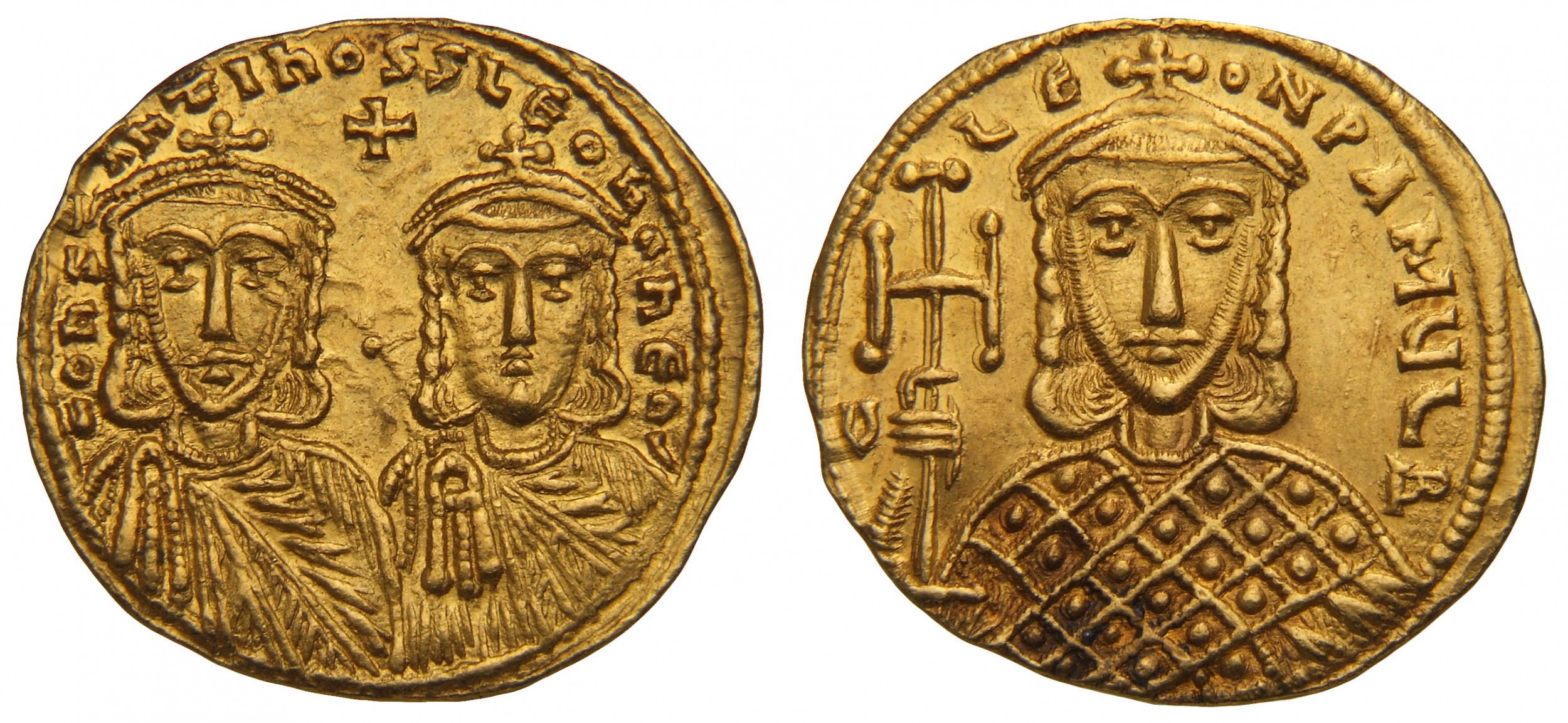
Golden solidus depicting Emperor Leo III and Co-Emperor Constantine V

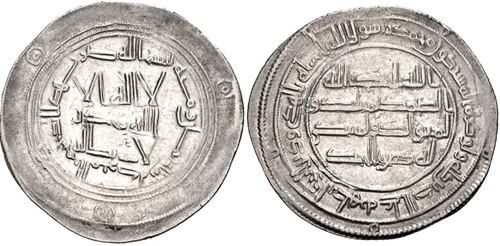
Silver dirham depicting Caliph Hisham ibn Abd al-Malik

In 740, the Umayyad Caliphate had conducted a major invasion of Anatolia, but had been repulsed with severe losses by the Byzantines. It was punctuated by the crushing defeat to one of its columns, by an army led by Byzantine Emperor Leo III, at the Battle of Akroinon. The Umayyad difficulties against Byzantium at this time were compounded by recent reversals on other frontiers of their Caliphate, including their defeat at Navsari in India and in the ongoing Berber Revolt, where the recent losses had forced a transfer of Umayyad Arab forces from Syria to North Africa. The Byzantine navy appears to have exploited the ongoing dispersals of Umayyad military power in 740, to conduct an amphibious raid on the coasts of Lebanon, which prompted the Arabs to assemble reserve forces at Damascus.

Despite their losses, the Umayyad Caliphate under Caliph Hisham ibn Abd al-Malik remained militarily formidable and an acute threat for the Byzantine Empire. Within a year of his unsuccessful campaign of 740, Sulayman ibn Hisham, the Caliph's son, was able to organise another large-scale offensive into Asia Minor. By summer 741, Sulayman had assembled a powerful army for his attack, although in light of casualties sustained in 740, and transferrals of Syrian forces to North Africa, its numbers were likely lower than those of the army Sulayman had led the previous year, which were supposedly 90,000.

== Invasion of Asia Minor in 741 ==
Sulayman launched his invasion of Asia Minor in early summer 741, directing his attack towards an unspecified fortress in Anatolia. However, the fortress resisted the Arab attempts to capture it, and Umayyad fortunes worsened with the outbreak of a plague among the ranks of their soldiers. The Umayyad position deteriorated further with the onset of starvation amongst their ranks, with their troops being unable to collect sufficient fodder and supplies, likely due to Fabian strategy of scorched earth tactics by the Byzantines. Byzantine thematic units also attacked the Arabs relentlessly, presumably as they detached parts of their army to forage for supplies. With their logistics thus debilitated, the Umayyads suffered significant losses with most of the horses in their army perishing.

Once these adversities had sufficiently debilitated the fighting potential of the Umayyad army, the Byzantines intensified their attacks. The Umayyads were dealt a severe defeat from their clashes with the Byzantine armies in this state, with many of their troops being killed. According to Agapius, contingents of Sulayman's army even surrendered themselves to the Byzantines, and later converted to Christianity. Sulayman himself managed to escape to Umayyad territory, but a large part of his army had perished during the campaign.

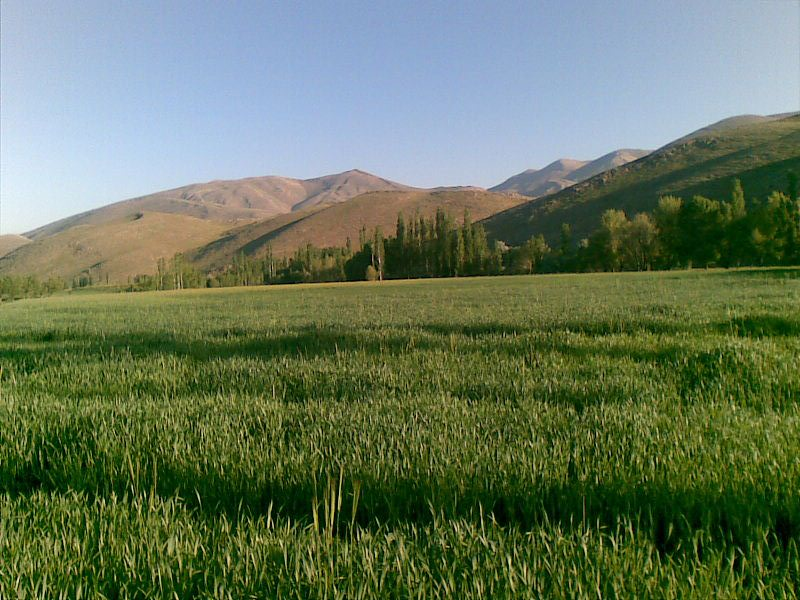
Hills and plains near Melitene

Soon after the repulsion of Sulayman's invasion, the Byzantines exploited the heavy losses suffered by the Umayyads to conduct a counterstrike towards Melitene, assembling an army of 20,000 to march into Arab territory. With much of the garrison depleted at the time of the attack, the citizens of Melitene resorted to stationing the women of the town, armed and dressed in turbans, in order to deceive the Byzantines into believing that a strong force was defending the city. Though this ploy was effective and deterred the Byzantines from attempting a to besiege the location, their invasion proved successful in taking significant amounts of loot and captives, and devastating the surrounding territory of Melitene, with little effective opposition by the Umayyads.

== Aftermath ==
The Byzantine offensive in 741 had caught the Arabs off-guard and prompted Caliph Hisham himself to travel to Melitene and personally oversee fortification efforts to bolster the defences of the city. Later in the year, the Caliph received a false report that the Muslim prisoners taken by the Byzantines in recent years had been executed on the orders of the emperor. Enraged by this report, Hisham ordered Sulayman to execute every Byzantine prisoner held in captivity. This policy of massacres took place across Syria. The loss of Umayyad prestige in the wake of the recent defeats inflicted by Byzantium may have contributed to these extreme actions undertaken by the Umayyads.

The death of Emperor Leo in 741 nonetheless gave respite to the Umayyads, as his successor Constantine V was forced to fight a civil war to secure the throne. Taking advantage of the diversion of Byzantine forces away from the frontier, the Umayyads conducted smaller invasions into Anatolia in 742, 743 and 744. (Note: Both Constantine V and the usurper Artavasdos appealed to the Umayyads for aid against their rival in the Civil war (Lilie, p.154)) Though these attacks were more successful than those of 740 and 741, in taking captives and loot from the countryside, the Umayyads achieved no greater victory or capture of fortresses in these final attacks, and failed to penetrate as deeply into Asia Minor in comparison with prior expeditions. In the final years of Hisham and in the reign of his successor, Al-Walid II, Umayyad forces were sufficiently depleted and could not fully exploit the succession crisis in Byzantium to capture and occupy strategic fortresses and cities. The raid in 744, under Al-Walid's brother, Al-Ghamr ibn Yazid, was the final one undertaken by Umayyad Caliphate against the Byzantines, and gained minimal strategic success. Conversely, in spite of their civil war, Byzantine forces were able to launch an offensive into Umayyad Melitene in 743, which sacked the fortress of Sozopetra. In subsequent years, the Byzantines, during Constantine V's reign, were able to exploit the series of civil wars in the caliphate to undertake a number of offensives into Arab territory, before the Abbasids ultimately stabilized the Thughur.

== Bibliography ==
- Crawford, Peter (2024). Emperor Leo III the Isaurian Imperial Saviour, Christian Icon Breaker?. Pen & Sword History. ISBN 978 1 39907 284 7.
- Treadgold, Warren (1997). A History of the Byzantine State and Society. Stanford, California: Stanford University Press. ISBN 978-0804779371.
- Blankinship, Khalid Yahya (1994). The End of the Jihâd State: The Reign of Hishām ibn ʻAbd al-Malik and the Collapse of the Umayyads. Albany, New York: State University of New York Press. ISBN 978-0-7914-1827-7.
- Kaegi, Walter E. (2010). "Confronting Islam: Emperors Versus Caliphs (641–c. 850)". In Shepherd, Jonathan (ed.). The Cambridge History of the Byzantine Empire c.500–1492. Cambridge University Press.
- Lilie, Ralph-Johannes (1976). Die byzantinische Reaktion auf die Ausbreitung der Araber. Studien zur Strukturwandlung des byzantinischen Staates im 7. und 8. Jhd [The Byzantine Response to the Spread of the Arabs. Studies on the structural change of the Byzantine state in the 7th and 8th centuries] (in German). Munich: Institut für Byzantinistik und Neugriechische Philologie der Universität München. OCLC 797598069.
