= Battal Gazi =

Mythical Turkish warrior

Seyyid Battal Ghazi is a Turkish warrior based in Anatolia (associated primarily with Malatya, where his father, Hüseyin Gazi, was the ruler) based on the real-life exploits of the 8th-century Umayyad military leader Abdallah al-Battal. His attributed legends, which also form the bulk of the information available on the historic personality, later became an important part of Turkish folk literature.

His title Seyyid, as well as being an Arabic honorific, may refer, in the form "Seyyid", to family ties to Muhammad.

== The legends ==
Sources available on the historical personality of Abdallah al-Battal consist of legends often written in the mesnevi style, and which may comport historically correct elements or points that support each other, as well as contradictions. For example, he is cited as having participated in his twenties to the Second Arab Siege of Constantinople in 718, and the legends name his Byzantine enemy as Leon, which could be no other than Leo III the Isaurian, the Emperor during the siege. On the basis of this information, his date of birth is reckoned to be around 690-695 and there is a consensus among historians for accepting 740 as the year of his death, at the Battle of Akroinon. On the other hand, in one story Battal Gazi raids the Maiden's Tower and rides away from Üsküdar, on the city's Asian side, with the Emperor's treasures and daughter, an event that is not confirmed by any historical record.

Battal Gazi was revindicated as an ancestor of Danishmend Gazi in the romanced epic on the Turkish Bey, Danishmendnâme, in which stories relating to the two figures are blended, possibly with a view to stress the presence of Islam in Anatolia even before the main Turkish advance following the Battle of Manzikert (modern Malazgirt). The verses that compose Danishmendnâme were compiled from Turkish folk literature for a first time by order of the Anatolian Seljuk Sultan Alâeddin Keykubad, a century after Danishmend's death, and the final form that reached our day is a compendium that was put together under the instructions of the early 15th century Ottoman sultan Murad II.

Battal Gazi remains a spiritual figure in Turkey's modern day urban culture. This is partly due to a series of films in which Battal Gazi was incarnated by and immortalised anew under the chiselled features of the Turkish film star Cüneyt Arkın. These modern references sometimes involve touches of indirect humour.

== The tombs ==
Battal Gazi is buried in Seyitgazi, a town named after him and where he is believed to have been martyred (possibly during a siege of the nearby Amorium), in Eskişehir Province, Turkey. Upon the initiative as of 1207 of Ümmühan Hatun, wife of the Anatolian Seljuk Sultan Gıyaseddin Keyhüsrev I and mother of Alâeddin Keykubad I, Battal Gazi's tomb was extended into a complex containing a mosque, a medrese, cells and ceremonial rooms for dervishes as well as charitable services for the community such as kitchens and a bakery, and it was later renovated extensively under the Ottoman sultan Bayezid II's reign. As such, Seyyid Battal Gazi Complex in Seyitgazi remains a much visited shrine.

On the other hand, many other localities across Turkey also put forth claims as burial places either for Battal Gazi, or for his father Hüseyin Gazi. A tomb in Divriği and another one in Ankara on top of a hill named after Hüseyin Gazi are the most famous among the shrines thought to contain the father's remains.

The district centre of Battalgazi in Turkey's Malatya Province, formerly Eskimalatya (Old Malatya) and the previous location of Malatya city, at a distance of 20 km from the modern day urban centre, was renamed in honour of Battal Gazi. Battal Gazi's wife and two children are buried in the town.
