= Dalisandus (Isauria) =

Ancient city in Lycaonia

Coordinates: 36°40′40″N 33°28′48″E

Dalisandus or Dalisandos (Ancient Greek: Δαλισανδός) was a city of ancient Cappadocia and later of Isauria, near the river Cydnus. It is considered to have been near Sınabiç, 6 km north of Claudiopolis (present-day Mut, Mersin), Turkey.

== Other cities of that name ==
Dalisandus in Isauria is distinct from Dalisandus in Pamphylia, and from the Dalisandus in Lycaonia whose site is considered to be at Belören.

== History ==
In 478, Byzantine Emperor Zeno exiled the widowed empress Verina to Dalisandus in Isauria, which was also the birthplace of Leontius, whom Verina, perhaps against her will, crowned as emperor at Tarsus in Cilicia in 484, in the course of an unsuccessful rebellion against Zeno.

== Bishopric ==
The Synecdemus mentions Dalisandus among the cities of Isauria and, when it became a Christian bishopric, it was a suffragan of Seleucia in Isauria, the capital of the Roman province.

Its bishop Marinus was at the First Council of Constantinople in 381. Stephanus did not go to the Council of Chalcedon in 451, but metropolitan bishop Basilius of Seleucia signed the acts on his behalf, and he himself signed the joint letter that the bishops of the province wrote to Emperor Leo I the Thracian in 458 regarding the murder of Proterius of Alexandria. Constantinus was at the Third Council of Constantinople in 680 and Cosmas at the Trullan Council in 692. Another Constantinus was at the Second Council of Nicaea in 787.

No longer a residential bishopric, Dalisandus in Isauria is listed by the Catholic Church as a titular see.

Under the name "Dalisandus in Isauria", it is a titular see of the Roman Catholic Church
