= Sibora =

Town of ancient Pontus

Coordinates: 39°41′52″N 35°17′11″E

Sibora, also possibly called Foroba, was a town of ancient Pontus, inhabited in Roman and Byzantine times.

Its site is located near Karamağara, Asiatic Turkey.
