= Al-Ghamr ibn Yazid =

Umayyad prince and Army officer

Al-Ghamr ibn Yazid الغمر بن يزيد
- Died: 750; Near Nahr Abi Futrus, Palestine, Umayyad Caliphate
Names
- Al-Ghamr ibn Yazid ibn Abd al-Malik
- Dynasty: Umayyad
- Father: Yazid II
- Religion: Islam
- Military career
- Relatives: Hisham (uncle) al-Walid II (brother); Sulayman ibn Hisham (cousin); Yazid III (cousin); Ibrahim (cousin)
- Allegiance: Umayyad Caliphate
- Service years: c. 740 – c. 744
- Conflicts: Arab–Byzantine wars

Al-Ghamr ibn Yazid ibn Abd al-Malik (Arabic: الغمر بن يزيد, romanized: al-Ghamr ibn Yazīd; fl. 743 – c. 750) was an Umayyad prince and commander. He led the last Umayyad campaign against the Byzantine Empire in 743.

== Family ==
Al-Ghamr was the son of the Umayyad caliph Yazid II (r. 720–724). He owned extensive estates around Harran and resided in the desert castles of al-Muwaqqar, Qasr Kharana and Dhu Khushub in the Balqa (Transjordan). He was a younger brother of Caliph al-Walid II (r. 743–744), with whom he had good relations. Anecdotes recorded in the 10th-century Kitab al-aghani, have al-Ghamr and al-Walid spending time imbibing wine and being entertained by singers at the monastery of Deir Murran at the foot Mount Qasioun near Damascus. Al-Ghamr introduced to al-Walid the poet Muti ibn Iyas and secured the caliph's favor with another poet, Malik ibn Abi Samh. Later, both al-Ghamr and al-Walid carried the bier of the famous singer Ma'bad ibn Wahb during his funeral at the palace of Khirbat al-Mafjar in the Jordan Valley.

== Raids against the Byzantines ==
Al-Ghamr served as a commander in one of the largest campaigns undertaken against the Byzantines during the reign of his uncle, Caliph Hisham (r. 724–743). The overall head of the campaign, al-Ghamr's cousin Sulayman ibn Hisham, dispatched him with 10,000 horsemen to ambush Byzantine forces in western Anatolia, while the governor of Malatya, Malik ibn Shu'ayb, and the commander Abdallah al-Battal, led separate forces, reaching as far as Akroinon. Sulayman and his troops came in as a rear guard. In the end, the campaign, while wreaking devastation on the inhabitants of Anatolia and their property, did not result in the capture of any forts or territory. While al-Ghamr and Sulayman returned safely to Syria, Malik and Abdallah al-Battal were both slain.

In 743, Caliph al-Walid II appointed al-Ghamr to command the annual summer campaign against the Byzantines. It also ended without the capture of any territory or forts, but al-Ghamr took several prisoners. It was the first and only campaign of al-Walid II's reign and the final campaign against the Byzantines under the Umayyads.

== Death ==
After al-Walid II was assassinated in the Third Muslim Civil War, the powerful Umayyad governor of the northern frontier, Marwan II, demanded al-Ghamr take revenge against the conspirators, who included rival Umayyad princes. When the Umayyads were toppled in 750 by the Abbasids, many were massacred at an estate at Nahr Abi Futrus in Palestine. Al-Ghamr was among them but due to his friendship with the Abbasid general Abdallah ibn Ali, he was given the dignity of dying by the sword, rather than being bashed to death like the other Umayyads.

According to Ibn al-Abbar, the father and namesake of the Rustamid dynasty, which ruled part of the Maghreb in 777–909, was a mawla (client) of al-Ghamr.

== Bibliography ==
- Blankinship, Khalid Yahya (1994). The End of the Jihâd State: The Reign of Hishām ibn ʻAbd al-Malik and the Collapse of the Umayyads. Albany, New York: State University of New York Press. ISBN 978-0-7914-1827-7.
- Gaiser, Adam (2013). "Slaves and Silver Across the Strait of Gibraltar: Politics and Trade between Umayyad Iberia and Kharījite North Africa". In Liang, Yuen-Gen; Balbale, Abigail Krasner; Devereux, Andrew; Gómez-Rivaz, Camillo (eds.). Spanning the Strait: Studies in Unity in the Western Mediterranean. Leiden and Boston: Brill. pp. 41–70. ISBN 978-90-04-25663-7.
- Hillenbrand, Robert (1988). Walid and His Friends: An Umayyad Tragedy. Oxford University Press. ISBN 9780197280119.
- Hillenbrand, Robert (2001). Studies in Medieval Islamic Architecture, Volume 1. Pindar Press. ISBN 1-899828-14-1.
- Judd, Steven Clark (1997). The Third Fitna: Orthodoxy, Heresy and Coercion in Late Umayyad History (PhD diss.). University of Michigan.
- Kilpatrick, Hilary (2010). "Umar ibn Abd al-Azīz, al-Walīd ibn Yazīd and their Kin: Images of the Umayyads in the Kitab al-Aghanī". In Borrut, Antoine; Cobb, Paul M. (eds.). Umayyad Legacies: Medieval Memories from Syria to Spain. Leiden and Boston: Brill. pp. 63–88. ISBN 978-90-04-18474-9.
- Robinson, Chase F. (2010). "The Violence of the Abbasid Revolution". In Suleiman, Yasir (ed.). Living Islamic History: Studies in Honour of Professor Carole Hillenbrand. Edinburgh: Edinburgh University Press. pp. 226–251. ISBN 978-0-7486-3738-6.
