= Dalisandus in Pamphylia =

Ancient city and bishopric in eastern Pamphylia

Dalisandus or Dalisandos (Ancient Greek: Δαλισανδός) was an ancient city and bishopric in eastern Pamphylia, in Asia Minor (Anatolia, Asian Turkey) and remains a Latin titular see.

Although some sources place the ancient settlement near Lake Seydişehir, various other studies suggest different locations. The exact site of the ancient city of Dalisandos has long been a subject of scholarly debate. Historian W. M. Ramsay initially proposed the village of Fasıllar near Beyşehir as the site, but later revised his view, suggesting instead that Dalisandos was located in Seydişehir.

In antiquity, Dalisandos served as a key junction and strategic connection point between the regions of Lycaonia and Isauria. Today, the city is commonly identified with the modern village of Belören (also known as Sarıoğlan) in the Bozkır district of Konya Province. This ancient settlement was continuously inhabited from the Early Bronze Age onward and retained its significance during the Hellenistic and Roman periods. The location of Sarıoğlan Höyük played a vital role as a crossroads linking Central Anatolia, the Mediterranean, and Western Anatolia.

British archaeologist David Henry French identified Dalisandos as a border city between Isauria and Lycaonia, and a member of the Koinon Lykaonon (Lycaonian League). The city minted its own coins during the reigns of Roman Emperors Marcus Aurelius, Lucius Verus, Faustina the Younger, Philippus I, and Philippus II. These coins indicate that Dalisandos was one of six major cities—along with Derbe (Kerti Höyük), Hyde (Gölören), Ilistra (Yollarbaşı), Barata (Madenşehir), and Laranda (Karaman)—that formed the core of the league.

== History ==
This Dalisandus is not mentioned in the Synecdemus, which does mention another Dalisandus in Isauria. However, it is included in the Notitiae Episcopatuum of the Patriarchate of Constantinople as a suffragan see of Side, the capital of the late Roman province of Pamphylia Prima.

== Titular see ==
No longer a residential bishopric, Dalisandus in Pamphylia is today listed by the Catholic Church as a Latin titular bishopric since the diocese was nominally restored in 1933.

It is vacant for decades, having had the following incumbents of the fitting Episcopal (lowest) rank:

- Bishop-elect Gérard-Paul-Louis-Marie de Milleville, Holy Ghost Fathers (C.S.Sp.) (1955.05.08 – 1955.09.14), as Apostolic Vicar of Conakry (Guinea) (1955.05.08 – 1955.09.14), promoted first Metropolitan Archbishop of above Conakry (1955.09.14 – 1962.03.10), also Apostolic Administrator of Apostolic Prefecture of Kankan (Guinea) (1957 – 1958.12.14); later Titular Archbishop of Gabala (1962.03.10 – 2007.01.12) as Auxiliary Bishop of Fortaleza (Brazil) (1967 – 1984) and Apostolic Administrator of Basse-Terre (Guadeloupe, French Antilles) (1968.01.29 – 1970.10.05), died 2007
- Rudolf Johannes Maria Koppmann, Missionary Oblates of Mary Immaculate (O.M.I.) (1957.01.26 – 2007.06.24) as Coadjutor Apostolic Vicar of Windhoek (Namibia) (1957.01.26 – 1961.03.20) and having succeeded as Apostolic Vicar of above Windhoek (1961.03.20 – retired 1980.11.29), died 2007.

== See also ==
- Dalisandus in Isauria

== Sources and references ==
- GCatholic
- Raymond Janin, lemma '2. Dalisandos', in Dictionnaire d'Histoire et de Géographie ecclésiastiques, vol. XIV, 1960, coll. 26-27
