= Battle of Akroinon =

740 Battle of the Arab-Byzantine Wars in Anatolia

Coordinates: 38°45′N 30°32′E

- Part of the Arab–Byzantine wars
- Map of Anatolia (Asia Minor) c. 740 AD. Akroinon is located at the center of the western edge of the central Anatolian plateau
Date	740 AD
Location	Akroinon, Byzantine Empire (present-day Afyon, Turkey)
Result	Byzantine victory

Belligerents
Umayyad Caliphate	Byzantine Empire

Commanders and leaders
Abdallah al-Battal † al-Malik ibn Shu'aib †	Leo III; Constantine V

Strength
20,000	Unknown

Casualties and losses
13,200 killed	Unknown

The Battle of Akroinon was fought at Akroinon or Akroinos (near modern Afyon) in Phrygia, on the western edge of the Anatolian plateau, in 740 between an Umayyad Arab army and the Byzantine forces. The Arabs had been conducting regular raids into Anatolia for the past century, and the 740 expedition was the largest in recent decades, consisting of three separate divisions. One division, 20,000 strong under Abdallah al-Battal and al-Malik ibn Shu'aib, was confronted at Akroinon by the Byzantines under the command of Emperor Leo III the Isaurian (r. 717–741) and his son, the future Constantine V (r. 741–775). The battle resulted in a decisive Byzantine victory. Coupled with the Umayyad Caliphate's troubles on other fronts and the internal instability before and after the Abbasid Revolt, this put an end to major Arab incursions into Anatolia for three decades.

== Background ==
Since the beginning of the Muslim conquests, the Byzantine Empire, as the largest, richest, and militarily strongest state bordering the expanding Caliphate, had been the Muslims' primary enemy. Following the disastrous Battle of Sebastopolis, the Byzantines had largely confined themselves to a strategy of passive defence, while the Muslim armies regularly launched raids into Byzantine-held Anatolia.

Following their failure to capture the Byzantine capital, Constantinople, in 717–718, the Umayyads for a time diverted their attention elsewhere. From 720/721, however, they resumed their expeditions against Byzantium in a regular pattern: each summer one or two campaigns (pl. ṣawā'if, sing. ṣā'ifa) would be launched, sometimes accompanied by a naval attack and sometimes followed by winter expeditions (shawātī). These were no longer aimed at permanent conquest but were rather large-scale raids, plundering and devastating the countryside, and only occasionally attacking forts or major settlements. The raids of this period were also largely confined to the central Anatolian plateau (chiefly its eastern half, Cappadocia), and only rarely reached the peripheral coastlands.

Under the more aggressive Caliph Hisham ibn Abd al-Malik (r. 723–743), the Arab raids became more substantial affairs and were led by some of the Caliphate's most capable generals, including princes of the Umayyad dynasty, such as Maslama ibn Abd al-Malik or Hisham's own sons Mu'awiyah, Maslama, and Sulayman. Gradually, however, the Muslim successes became fewer, especially as their resources were drawn into the mounting conflict with the Khazars in the Caucasus. The raids continued, but the Arab and Byzantine chroniclers mention fewer successful captures of forts or towns. Nevertheless, in 737 a major victory over the Khazars allowed the Arabs to shift their focus and intensify their campaigns against Byzantium. Thus in 738 and 739 Maslamah ibn Hisham led successful raids, including the capture of the town of Ancyra. For the year 740, Hisham assembled the largest expedition of his reign, appointing his son Sulayman to lead it.

== Battle ==
According to the chronicle of Theophanes the Confessor, the invading Umayyad force totalled 90,000 men. 10,000 lightly armed men under al-Ghamr ibn Yazid were sent to raid the western coastlands, followed by 20,000 under Abdallah al-Battal and al-Malik ibn Su'aib who marched towards Akroinon, while the main force of some 60,000 (this last number is certainly much inflated), under Sulayman ibn Hisham, raided Cappadocia.

The Emperor Leo confronted the second force at Akroinon. Details of the battle are not known, but the Emperor secured a crushing victory: both Arab commanders fell, as well as the larger part of their army, some 13,200 men. The rest of the Arab troops managed to conduct an orderly retreat to Synnada, where they joined Sulayman. The other two Arab forces devastated the countryside unopposed, but failed to take any towns or forts. The Arab invasion army also suffered from severe hunger and lack of supplies before returning to Syria, while the 10th-century Arab Christian historian Agapius records that the Byzantines took 20,000 prisoners from the invading forces.

== Effect and aftermath ==
Akroinon was a major success for the Byzantines, as it was the first victory they had scored in a major pitched battle against the Arabs in decades. The victory also served to strengthen Leo's belief in the policy of iconoclasm that he had adopted some years before. In the immediate aftermath, this success, along with the failed Umayyad invasion of the following year, opened up the way for a more aggressive stance by the Byzantines, who in 741 attacked the major Arab base of Melitene. In 742 and 743, the Umayyads were able to exploit a civil war between Constantine V and the general Artabasdos and raid into Anatolia with relative impunity, but the Arab sources do not report any major achievements.

The Arab defeat at Akroinon has traditionally been seen as a decisive battle and causing the slackening of Arab pressure on Byzantium. Other historians however, from the early 20th-century Syriac scholar E.W. Brooks to more recent ones such as Walter Kaegi and Ralph-Johannes Lilie, have challenged this view, attributing the reduced Arab threat after Akroinon to the fact that it coincided with other heavy reversals on the most remote provinces of the Caliphate (e.g. the battles of Marj Ardabil or The Defile), which exhausted its overextended military resources, as well as with internal turmoil due to civil wars and the Abbasid Revolution. As a result, the Arab attacks against the Byzantine Empire in the 740s were rather ineffectual and soon ceased completely. Indeed, Constantine V was able to take advantage of the Umayyad Caliphate's collapse to launch a series of expeditions into Syria and secure a Byzantine ascendancy on the eastern frontier which lasted until the 770s.

In the Muslim world, the memory of the defeated Arab commander, Abdallah al-Battal, was preserved, and he became one of the greatest heroes of Arab and later Turkish epic poetry as Sayyid Battal Ghazi.

== Sources ==
- Blankinship, Khalid Yahya (1994). The End of the Jihâd State: The Reign of Hishām ibn ʻAbd al-Malik and the Collapse of the Umayyads. Albany, New York: State University of New York Press. ISBN 978-0-7914-1827-7.
- Foss, Clive F.W. (1991). "Akroinon". In Kazhdan, Alexander (ed.). The Oxford Dictionary of Byzantium. Oxford and New York: Oxford University Press. p. 48. ISBN 0-19-504652-8.
- Herrin, Judith (1977). "The Context of Iconoclast Reform". In Bryer, Anthony; Herrin, Judith (eds.). Iconoclasm. Papers given at the Ninth Spring Symposium of Byzantine Studies, University of Birmingham, March 1975. pp. 15–20. ISBN 0-7044-0226-2.
- Kaegi, Walter Emil (1982). Army, Society, and Religion in Byzantium. London: Variorum Reprints. ISBN 978-0-86078-110-3.
- Lilie, Ralph-Johannes; Ludwig, Claudia; Pratsch, Thomas; Zielke, Beate (1999). "'Abdallāh al-Baṭṭāl (# 15)". Prosopographie der mittelbyzantinischen Zeit: 1. Abteilung (641–867), Band 1: Aaron (# 1) – Georgios (# 2182) (in German). Berlin and Boston: De Gruyter. pp. 5–6. ISBN 978-3-11-015179-4.
- Morrisson, Cécile; Cheynet, Jean-Claude (2006). Le monde byzantin, Tome II: L'Empire byzantin, 641–1204 (in French). Paris: Presses Universitaires de France. ISBN 978-2-13-052007-8.
- Turtledove, Harry (1982). The Chronicle of Theophanes: An English Translation of anni mundi 6095–6305 (A.D. 602–813). Philadelphia, Pennsylvania: University of Pennsylvania Press. ISBN 978-0-8122-1128-3.
- Treadgold, Warren (1997). A History of the Byzantine State and Society. Stanford, California: Stanford University Press. ISBN 0-8047-2630-2.
