= Siege of Nicaea (727) =

Part of the Arab–Byzantine Wars

Coordinates: 40°25.74′N 29°43.17′E

- Part of the Arab–Byzantine wars
- Map of Anatolia (Asia Minor) in 740 AD. Nicaea is located at the northwestern corner of the Anatolian peninsula
Date	July–August 727 AD
Location	Nicaea, Bithynia (modern-day İznik, Bursa, Turkey)
Result	Byzantine victory

Belligerents
Byzantine Empire	Umayyad Caliphate

Commanders and leaders
Artabasdos	Mu'awiya ibn Hisham; Abdallah al-Battal

The siege of Nicaea of 727 was an unsuccessful attempt by the Umayyad Caliphate to capture the Byzantine city of Nicaea, the capital of the Opsician Theme. Ever since its failure to capture the Byzantine Empire's capital, Constantinople, in 717–718, the Caliphate had launched a series of raids into Byzantine Asia Minor. In 727, the Arab army, led by one of the Caliph's sons, penetrated deep into Asia Minor, sacked two Byzantine fortresses and in late July arrived before Nicaea. Despite constant attacks for 40 days, the city held firm and the Arabs withdrew and returned to the Caliphate. The successful repulsion of the attack was a major boost for Byzantine emperor Leo III the Isaurian's recently initiated campaign to abolish the veneration of icons in the Empire; Leo claimed it as evidence of divine favour for his policy. The siege of Nicaea marks also the high point of the Umayyad raids, as new threats and defeats on their far-flung frontiers decreased Umayyad strength elsewhere, while Byzantine power strengthened afterwards.

== Background ==
Following the failure of the year-long assault by the Umayyad armies on the Byzantine capital Constantinople in 717–718, a short period of peace followed as the Umayyads licked their wounds, suppressed the rebellion of Yazid ibn al-Muhallab, and re-assessed their priorities. When warfare on the Arab–Byzantine frontier recommenced in 720, the strategic focus of the Caliphate had shifted away from outright conquest. The Muslim raids across the Taurus Mountains into Byzantine Asia Minor still occurred regularly every spring and summer, sometimes accompanied by naval raids and followed by a winter expedition; they devastated large tracts of Asia Minor, and destroyed several fortresses; but the Arabs did not attempt to hold on to captured strongholds on the west side of the Taurus Mountains. Byzantine reaction during these years was passive, as the Empire still nursed its strength against the vastly superior resources of the Caliphate. The Byzantines did not obstruct or confront the raiding Arab armies, but rather retreated to well-fortified positions scattered throughout Asia Minor.

After the accession of Caliph Hisham (r. 723–743), the scale and ambition of the Muslim raids grew. One of the most prominent Umayyad leaders in these campaigns was Hisham's son Mu'awiya, who led expeditions in 725 and 726, the first of which went as far west as Dorylaion.

== Invasion of 727 and the siege of Nicaea ==
In summer 727, another large-scale invasion was led by Mu'awiya, with Abdallah al-Battal heading the vanguard of the army. The Byzantine chronicler Theophanes the Confessor claims that the vanguard alone numbered 15,000 men and the entire invasion force 100,000, clearly a grossly inflated number according to some scholars. Theophanes also records a certain Amr as Mu'awiya's second-in-command, but Arab sources are unambiguous in this regard. The Arab army moved west into northwestern Asia Minor, and the vanguard under al-Battal attacked and sacked the town of Gangra in Paphlagonia and a place called in Arab sources Tabya, possibly the fort of Ateous in Phrygia. Gangra was razed to the ground, but during the attack on Tabya the Arabs, especially the Antiochene contingent, are said to have suffered heavy losses.

From there, the Arabs turned west towards Nicaea, the chief city of Bithynia and capital of the powerful Opsician Theme. The Arabs arrived before the city in late July, with al-Battal's vanguard preceding the main army. The Byzantines, probably under the command of the Count of the Opsicians, Artabasdos, did not meet them in the field, but instead retreated behind the city's walls. The Arabs assaulted the city for forty days, employing siege engines which destroyed a part of the walls, but eventually failed to take it. In late August, they raised the siege and departed, taking many captives and much booty. The 12th-century chronicle of Michael the Syrian claims that the city's inhabitants abandoned it and fled by ship through Lake Ascania, whereupon the Arabs destroyed Nicaea, but this is clearly an error.

== Aftermath ==
The repulsion of the Arab assault on Nicaea was an important success for the Byzantines. Emperor Leo III the Isaurian (r. 717–741) regarded the city's survival as a sign of divine favour towards his newly instituted iconoclastic policies, and was encouraged to drive them further. This is probably related to an incident mentioned in the account of Theophanes, where a certain Constantine, who served as a groom (strator) to Artabasdos, threw a stone on an icon of the Virgin Mary and then trampled on it. The soldier was killed the next day by a catapult, a fact which Theophanes reports as evidence of divine vengeance. However, this passage shows strong signs of tampering by the fervently anti-iconoclast Theophanes, from what was probably originally a pro-iconoclast story.

Militarily, the siege of Nicaea was the high-water-mark of the post-718 Umayyad raids; never again would Umayyad armies penetrate as deeply into Asia Minor. Increasingly thereafter the Syro-Jaziran army, that provided the manpower for the raids against Byzantium, was diverted in the hard and fruitless wars against the Khazars in the Caucasus: the Khazars inflicted a heavy defeat on the Muslims in 730, and a Byzantine–Khazar alliance was sealed by the marriage of Leo III's son and heir Constantine V (r. 741–775) with the Khazar princess Irene shortly after. Over the next few years, while Byzantine strength revived, the Muslim military situation on all fronts of the over-extended Caliphate deteriorated. Consequently, in the 730s, Arab raids were mostly limited to the immediate frontier regions and their successes became fewer. By 740, when the Umayyads assembled the largest invasion force fielded after 718, the Byzantines had recovered enough to inflict a heavy defeat against them at the Battle of Akroinon.

== Sources ==
- Blankinship, Khalid Yahya (1994). The End of the Jihâd State: The Reign of Hishām ibn ʻAbd al-Malik and the Collapse of the Umayyads. Albany, New York: State University of New York Press. ISBN 978-0-7914-1827-7.
- Lilie, Ralph-Johannes (1976). Die byzantinische Reaktion auf die Ausbreitung der Araber. Studien zur Strukturwandlung des byzantinischen Staates im 7. und 8. Jhd (in German). Munich: Institut für Byzantinistik und Neugriechische Philologie der Universität München. OCLC 797598069.
- Makrypoulias, Christos (2003). Πολιορκία Νικαίας, 726-727. Encyclopaedia of the Hellenic World, Asia Minor (in Greek). Foundation of the Hellenic World.
- Mango, Cyril; Scott, Roger (1997). The Chronicle of Theophanes Confessor. Byzantine and Near Eastern History, AD 284–813. Oxford, United Kingdom: Oxford University Press. ISBN 0-19-822568-7.
