= Abdallah al-Battal =

Muslim Arab military general (died 740)

- Native name: عبدالله البطال
- Died: 740 Akroinon
- Allegiance: Umayyad Caliphate
- Service years: ca. 727–740
- Wars: Arab–Byzantine Wars

Abdallah al-Battal (Arabic: عبدالله البطال, lit. 'Abdallah the Hero'; died in 740) was a Muslim commander in the Arab–Byzantine Wars of the early 8th century, participating in several of the campaigns launched by the Umayyad Caliphate against the Byzantine Empire. Historical facts about his life are sparse, but in Anatolia, a legendary tradition grew around him after his death, and he became a famous figure in Turkish epic literature as Battal Gazi.

== Biography ==
Nothing is known of Abdallah al-Battal's origin or early life. Much later accounts claim that he hailed from Antioch or Damascus, and that he was a mawla of the Umayyad family. He is also given various kunya, Abu Muhammad, Abu Yahya, or Abu 'l-Husayn, by which he is usually known. The use of the nisba of al-Antaqi ("of Antioch") rather than a tribal affiliation suggests that he may not have been of Arab origin; in this context, his name "Abdallah" further suggests that he was a convert to Islam, as this name (meaning "servant of Allah") was often given to new converts in early Islamic times. Khalid Yahya Blankinship suggested that he might be the same person as a certain "Amr" recorded by the Byzantine chronicler Theophanes the Confessor in the Nicaea campaign of 727, and hence that "Amr" could be his actual personal name or a patronymic (i.e. his name could be 'Amr ibn Abdallah or Abdallah ibn 'Amr), while alternatively "Abdallah" could simply be an honorific.

Map of Byzantine Asia Minor and the Arab–Byzantine frontier zone in the early 8th century

Arab accounts from the 10th century place al-Battal alongside Maslama ibn Abd al-Malik during the latter's unsuccessful siege of Constantinople in 717–718, but as the Arab accounts of the siege are semi-legendary, it is impossible to know if this report contains any truth. In reliable historical sources (the chroniclers al-Ya'qubi and al-Tabari), al-Battal first appears in 727, in one of the annual raids against Byzantine Asia Minor. This campaign was commanded by Mu'awiya ibn Hisham, the son of the reigning Caliph Hisham (r. 723–743). Al-Battal led the vanguard, with which he penetrated as far as the city of Gangra in Paphlagonia, which he captured and razed, before the army went on to unsuccessfully lay siege to Nicaea. Blankinship considers that al-Battal's capture of Gangra ranks as one of the greatest successes of Umayyad arms against the Byzantines in this period, along with the capture of Caesarea by Maslama in 726.

Al-Battal himself commanded another raid in AH 114 (731–732), of which little is known. It most probably was a failure, and is remembered only for the death in battle of another Arab hero, Abd al-Wahhab ibn Bukht. In the next year, AH 115 (732–733), al-Battal campaigned again alongside Mu'awiya ibn Hisham, raiding as far as Akroinon in Phrygia. A Byzantine army under a certain Constantine tried to confront the Muslims, but al-Battal defeated Constantine and took him prisoner. Al-Battal's next and last appearance is in 740, when a major campaign involving several tens of thousands of men was launched by the Umayyads against Byzantium. Along with Malik ibn Shu'ayb, deputy governor of Malatya, al-Battal commanded a 20,000-strong cavalry force while Sulayman ibn Hisham led the main force behind them. Al-Battal and Malik's force reached as far as Akroinon, but there they were confronted and defeated by the Byzantines under Emperor Leo III the Isaurian (r. 717–741) in person. Both Arab generals and two thirds of their army perished.

== Legend ==
Although his military career was "not particularly distinguished" according to Marius Canard, Abdallah al-Battal quickly became the subject of popular tales and his fame grew, so that by the 10th century he was well established as one of the heroic figures of the Arab–Byzantine Wars: al-Mas'udi (The Meadows of Gold, VIII, 74–75) ranks him among the "illustrious Muslims" whose portraits were displayed in Byzantine churches as a mark of respect. In the 10th–12th centuries his alleged role in the siege of Constantinople was embellished by the Persian historian Bal'ami and the Andalusian mystic Ibn Arabi. A number of fictional anecdotes became part of the accepted historical corpus around al-Battal from the time of Ibn 'Asakir (1106–1175) on: the use of his name to frighten children by the Byzantines; his entry into Amorion pretending to be a messenger and discovery of the Byzantine plans; his stay at a convent, whose abbess shielded him from Byzantine soldiers and whom he took with him and married; and finally his death in battle and burial, attended by Emperor Leo himself. On the other hand, beginning with Ibn 'Asakir's contemporary al-Samaw'al ibn Yahya al-Maghribi, a succession of Muslim chroniclers were critical of the various fabrications introduced into the accounts of al-Battal's life. Ibn Kathir in particular regarded it as "poor and confused material suitable only for the unsophisticated".

Al-Battal's exploits became the subject of two romances, the Arabic-language "Tale of Delhemma and al-Battal" (Sīrat Ḏāt al-Himma wa-l-Baṭṭāl) and the Turkish epic tradition of Sayyid Baṭṭāl Ghāzī. Although both were composed in the 12th century and draw upon a common Arabic tradition, they show significant differences, with the Turkish tale including many uniquely Turkic and Persian influences, including supernatural elements from folk tradition or motifs from the Shahname and the Romance of Abu Muslim. Both romances place al-Battal in the mid-9th century and associate him with the epic cycle of Malatya and its emir, Umar al-Aqta (died 863), with the result that he became particularly associated with the city of Malatya and its region. In the Delhemma, his own role in the Umayyad wars with Byzantium is taken over by the Kilabite hero al-Sahsah. In these tales al-Battal is presented as an Islamic analogue to Odysseus, to the extent that his name became a byword for cunning.

The Turks adopted al-Battal following the Danishmendid conquest of Malatya in 1102, and he became prominent as a Turkish national hero, as a symbol of the revived frontier spirit of the jihad of early Muslim times, and of the Turkish conquest of Asia Minor. His stories (Battalname) were reworked throughout the Seljuk and Ottoman periods, and he became the subject of a considerable body of folk tales. Thus, according to the 14th-century geographer Abu'l-Fida, based on the 13th-century work of Ibn Sa'id, the river Dalaman çayı, which formed the boundary between the lands of the Seljuk Turks and the Empire of Nicaea, was known as the "River of Battal". A cult developed around him as a saintly figure ("sayyid"), especially among the Alevi and Bektashi sects, and his supposed tomb at Seyitgazi became a major centre of pilgrimage until the early 20th century, drawing pilgrims from as far as Central Asia.

== Sources ==
- Athamina, Khalil (2011). "al-Baṭṭāl, ʿAbdallāh". In Fleet, Kate; Krämer, Gudrun; Matringe, Denis; Nawas, John; Rowson, Everett (eds.). Encyclopaedia of Islam (3rd ed.). Brill Online. ISSN 1873-9830.
- Blankinship, Khalid Yahya (1994). The End of the Jihâd State: The Reign of Hishām ibn ʻAbd al-Malik and the Collapse of the Umayyads. Albany, New York: State University of New York Press. ISBN 978-0-7914-1827-7.
- Canard, Marius (1960). "al-Baṭṭāl, ʿAbd Allāh". In Gibb, H. A. R.; Kramers, J. H.; Lévi-Provençal, E.; Schacht, J.; Lewis, B. & Pellat, Ch. (eds.). The Encyclopaedia of Islam, Second Edition. Volume I: A–B. Leiden: E. J. Brill. pp. 1002–1003. OCLC 495469456.
- Canard, Marius (1961). "Les principaux personnages du roman de chevalerie arabe Ḏāt al-Himma wa-l-baṭṭāl". Arabica (in French). 8 (2): 158–173. doi:10.1163/157005861X00377. ISSN 0570-5398. JSTOR 4055170.
- Dedes, Georgios (1996). The Battalname, an Ottoman Turkish Frontier Epic Wondertale: Introduction, Turkish Transcription, English Translation and Commentary (PDF). Sources of Oriental Languages and Literatures. Cambridge, Massachusetts: Harvard University, Department of Near Eastern languages and Literatures.
- Melikoff, I. (1960). "al-Baṭṭāl (Sayyid Baṭṭāl Ghāzī)". In Gibb, H. A. R.; Kramers, J. H.; Lévi-Provençal, E.; Schacht, J.; Lewis, B. & Pellat, Ch. (eds.). The Encyclopaedia of Islam, Second Edition. Volume I: A–B. Leiden: E. J. Brill. pp. 1003–1004. OCLC 495469456.
- Lilie, Ralph-Johannes; Ludwig, Claudia; Pratsch, Thomas; Zielke, Beate (1999). "'Abdallāh al-Baṭṭāl (#15)". Prosopographie der mittelbyzantinischen Zeit: 1. Abteilung (641–867), Band 1: Aaron (# 1) – Georgios (# 2182) (in German). Berlin and Boston: De Gruyter. pp. 5–6. ISBN 978-3-11-015179-4.
- Wittek, Paul (1934). Das Fürstentum Mentesche. Studien zur Geschichte Westkleinasiens im 13.-15. Jahrhundert (in German). Istanbul: Zaman Kitaphanesi.
