= Sa'id ibn al-Mundhir =

Sa'id ibn al-Mundhir ibn Mu'awiya ibn Aban al-Qurashi, commonly known as Ibn al-Salim (d. 938), was an Umayyad prince, general and vizier of Caliph Abd al-Rahman III (r. 929–961) of al-Andalus.

== Origins ==
Sa'id was a patrilineal descendant of Aban ibn Mu'awiya ibn Hisham, a grandson of the Umayyad caliph Hisham ibn Abd al-Malik (r. 724–743), and brother of the first Umayyad emir of Córdoba Abd al-Rahman I (r. 756–788). Abd al-Rahman's direct descendants formed the ruling line of Umayyad emirs and later caliphs of Córdoba until the dynasty's demise in 1031 and Aban's descendants were a collateral branch of the family. Little or nothing is known about Sa'id's father al-Mundhir ibn Mu'awiya ibn Aban or Sa'id's brothers Aban and al-Hakam. Sa'id is better known in the medieval sources as 'Ibn al-Salim'.

== Commander and vizier under Abd al-Rahman III ==
By the reign of Abd al-Rahman III, members of the Umayyad family, who had long been a mainstay of Umayyad power in al-Andalus, had become overshadowed in military and political power by the saqaliba, slave soldiers of European origin. According to Hugh N. Kennedy, Sa'id was a key exception, being entrusted by Abd al-Rahman as his lifetime vizier and given important military and administrative commands.

Abd al-Rahman entrusted Sa'id with the governorship of Seville in 913, following his reconquest of the city from the Banu Hajjaj. In 914, Sa'id led the Umayyad army in its victory over Muhammad ibn Ibrahim ibn Hajjaj of the Banu Hajjaj and lord of Carmona. Abd al-Rahman appointed Sa'id governor of Guadalajara in 920 during the military campaign against its holders, the Banu Salim. Between 920 and 922, Sa'id led campaigns in the heart of Elvira on the southern Andalusian coast, gaining the submission of the fortified towns of Turrush and Monterrubio. In later years, he participated in the campaigns against the fortresses of Bobastro and San Esteban. Sa'id commanded the siege of Toledo in 930 and the siege of Zaragoza in 936. His best known military achievement was his final suppression of the rebellions of Umar ibn Hafsun, being the general Abd al-Rahman appointed to besiege the last of Umar's rebel sons, Hafs.

== Death and descendants ==
Sa'id died in 938. At least one of his descendants is recorded in the sources, his great-grandson Abd al-Rahman ibn Muhammad ibn al-Salim ibn Sa'id. Abd al-Rahman poisoned and killed the Umayyad caliph al-Mustakfi (r. 1023–1025).

Descendants of Hisham ibn Abd al-Malik

Hisham (r. 724–743)
Abu Shakir Maslama | Yazid al-Afqam | Sulayman | Sa'id | Mu'awiya | A'isha | 9 others
Sa'id al-Barmaki | Ubayd al-Salam | Uthman | Marwan | Aban | Abd al-Rahman I (r. 756–788) | Abdallah | al-Walid | others
al-Hakam | Ubaydallah | Descendants of Abd al-Rahman I | Ishaq | al-Mughira
Sulayman | Yahya | Mu'awiya
Muhammad | Aban | Abd al-Rahman | al-Mughira
Yazid | Mu'awiya | Mu'awiya | Abd al-Malik
al-Mundhir | Muhammad (Ibn al-Ahmar) | al-Mughira
Sa'id (Ibn al-Salim) | al-Hakam | Aban | Mu'awiya
al-Salim
Muhammad
Abd al-Rahman

Marwanid caliph
Umayyad emirs of al-Andalus

== Bibliography ==
- Kennedy, Hugh (1996). Muslim Spain and Portugal: A Political History of al-Andalus (First ed.). London: Taylor and Francis. ISBN 978-0-582-49515-9.
- Uzquiza Bartolomé, Aránzazu (1994). "Otros Linajes Omeyas en al-Andalus" [Other Umayyad Lineages in al-Andalus]. In Marín, Manuela (ed.). Estudios onomástico-biográficos de Al-Andalus: VI [Onomastic-biographies of al-Andalus: VI] (in Spanish). Madrid: Consejo Superior de Investigaciones Científicas. pp. 445–462. ISBN 84-00-07415-7.
