= Hisham =

Hisham هشام
- Pronunciation: Arabic: [hɪʃaːm]
- Gender: Male

Origin
- Origin: Arabic
- Meaning: generous
- Region of origin: Arabia (Middle East)

Other names
- Alternative spelling: Hesham, Hicham
- Related names: Hisham ud-Din

Hisham (Arabic: هشام) is an Arabic male given name which means "generous". It is not to be confused with the similar looking, but only slightly related, Hashim.

== People ==
=== Given name ===
- Hisham ibn al-Mughira (late 6th century), leader of Quraysh tribe
- Hisham ibn Abd al-Malik (691–743), Umayyad caliph (r. 724–743)
- Hisham ibn al-A'as (died 635), Arab companion of Muhammad
- Hisham I of Córdoba (757–796), emir of al-Andalus
- Hisham II of Córdoba (966–1013), caliph of al-Andalus
- Hisham III of Córdoba (died 1036), caliph of al-Andalus
- Pseudo-Hisham (died 1044), nominal caliph of al-Andalus
- Hisham ibn al-Kalbi (8th century), Muslim historian
- Hisham ibn Urwah (8th century), hadith narrator
- Hisham ibn al-Hakam (8th century), Shia theologian
- Hisham Abbas (born 1963), Egyptian singer
- Hisham Barakat (1950–2015), Egyptian prosecutor
- Hisham Bastawisy (died 2021), Egyptian judge
- Hisham Bin Al Bin Amor Sliti (born 1966), Tunisian former detainee
- Hisham Hafiz (1931–2006), Saudi Arabian newspaper publisher
- Hisham Ikhtiyar (died 2012), Syrian official
- Hisham Jaber (born 1942), Lebanese general
- Hisham Kabbani (1945–2024), Lebanese-American Islamic scholar
- Hisham Matar (born 1970), writer
- Hisham Nazer (1932–2015), Saudi Arabian politician
- Hisham Al Shaar (born 1958), Syrian politician
- Hisham Sulliman (born 1978), Arab-Israeli actor
- Hisham Talaat Moustafa (born 1959), Egyptian businessman
- Hisham Zazou (born 1954), Egyptian politician
- Hisham Zreiq (born 1968), Palestinian filmmaker and visual artist

=== Surname and family name ===
- Ibn Hisham (died 833), Muslim historian
- Maslama ibn Hisham (died 750), Umayyad prince
- Mu'awiya ibn Hisham (died 737), Arab general and prince
- Sulayman ibn Hisham, Arab general
- Yazid al-Afqam (died 744/46), also known as Yazid ibn Hisham, Umayyad prince

== See also ==
- Hesham
- Hicham
- Hisham ud-Din (disambiguation)
- Arabic name
