= Aban ibn Mu'awiya ibn Hisham =

Umayyad prince and commander (died 751)

Abān ibn Muʿāwiya ibn Hishām ibn ʿAbd al-Malik (Arabic: أبان بن معاوية بن هشام بن عبد الملك; died 751) was an Umayyad prince and commander who led a failed revolt against the Abbasid Caliphate shortly after the toppling of the Umayyad Caliphate in 750.

== Life ==
Aban was a son of the Umayyad prince and commander Mu'awiya ibn Hisham and grandson of Caliph Hisham ibn Abd al-Malik (r. 724–743). During the Third Muslim Civil War, he joined his uncle Sulayman ibn Hisham, who defected to the Kharijites against the Umayyad caliph Marwan II (r. 744–750). After the Kharijites' defeat, he led remnants of their forces, mostly the Syrian former troops of Sulayman, who had since fled Iraq, and joined the Alid rebel Abdallah ibn Mu'awiya at his stronghold of Istakhr in Iran. Aban was routed outside Istakhr by Marwan II's general, Amir ibn Dubara, who captured Aban, but released him.

During the Abbasid Revolution in 749–750, Marwan II and the bulk of his army were routed by the Abbasids at the Battle of the Zab. The Abbasids proceeded to conquer the Umayyads' Syrian heartland. An Umayyad prince, Abu Muhammad al-Sufyani, led a revolt against the Abbasids in the northern and central Syrian districts of Qinnasrin and Hims, but it was defeated. Abu Muhammad's nephew, al-Abbas ibn Muhammad al-Sufyani, then raised a revolt in Aleppo against the Abbasid governor Abdallah ibn Ali, but this was also suppressed. Abdallah ibn Ali marched northward and crushed a rebellion in Samosata by the pro-Umayyad troops of the Jazira led by Ishaq ibn Muslim al-Uqayli.

The remnants of the pro-Umayyad revolts in Syria and the Jazira coalesced around Aban. While Abdallah ibn Ali was on an expedition against the Byzantines in 751, Aban marched against him. Abdallah ibn Ali, hearing of Aban's movements, dispatched units to intercept the pro-Umayyad rebels. Aban's army was put to flight, with Aban escaping to Kaysum near Samosata, where he barricaded himself. Abdallah ibn Ali abandoned the Byzantine campaign to confront Aban, who was defeated and captured. In line with an interpretation of a Qur'anic punishment of rebels, the Abbasids had Aban's hands and feet cut off. Afterward, he was paraded through various Syrian cities under a banner proclaiming: "this is Aban ibn Mu'awiya, paladin of the Umayyads".

== Descendants ==
A son of Aban, Ubayd Allah, escaped the persecutions of the Umayyad family in Syria, eventually joining Aban's brother, Abd al-Rahman ibn Mu'awiya, who established the Umayyad Emirate of Cordoba in Islamic Spain in 756. Ubayd Allah was killed or executed in 779 for conspiring with his cousin, Ubayd al-Salam ibn Yazid, against Abd al-Rahman I. The 11th-century polymath Ibn Hazm recorded several descendants in al-Andalus of Ubayd Allah's great-great-grandson, al-Mundhir ibn Mu'awiya ibn Aban ibn Yahya ibn Ubayd Allah, including the latter's sons Aban, al-Hakam and the prominent vizier and general Sa'id ('Ibn al-Salim') and the latter's son al-Salim and great-grandson Abd al-Rahman ibn Muhammad ibn al-Salim. A separate lineage is recorded from Aban, his great-grandson: the author Yazid ibn Muhammad ibn Sulayman ibn al-Hakam, who emigrated to al-Andalus during the reign of Emir Abdallah r. 888–912) and died in the capital Córdoba without progeny.

Descendants of Hisham ibn Abd al-Malik

Hisham (r. 724–743)
Abu Shakir Maslama	Yazid al-Afqam	Sulayman	Sa'id	Mu'awiya	A'isha	9 others
Sa'id al-Barmaki	Ubayd al-Salam	Uthman	Marwan	Aban	Abd al-Rahman I (r. 756–788)	Abdallah	al-Walid	others
al-Hakam	Ubaydallah	Descendants of Abd al-Rahman I	Ishaq	al-Mughira
Sulayman	Yahya	Mu'awiya
Muhammad	Aban	Abd al-Rahman	al-Mughira
Yazid	Mu'awiya	Mu'awiya	Abd al-Malik
al-Mundhir	Muhammad	al-Mughira
Sa'id (Ibn al-Salim)	al-Hakam	Aban	Mu'awiya
al-Salim
Muhammad
Abd al-Rahman

Marwanid caliph
Umayyad emirs of al-Andalus

== Bibliography ==
- Cobb, Paul M. (2001). White Banners: Contention in 'Abbasid Syria, 750–880. SUNY Press. ISBN 978-0791448809.
- Scales, Peter C. (1994). The Fall of the Caliphate of Cordoba: Berbers and Arabs in Conflict. Leiden: E. J. Brill. ISBN 90-04-09868-2.
- Williams, John Alden, ed. (1985). The History of al-Ṭabarī, Volume XXVII: The ʿAbbāsid Revolution, A.D. 743–750/A.H. 126–132. SUNY Series in Near Eastern Studies. Albany, New York: State University of New York Press. ISBN 978-0-87395-884-4.
- Uzquiza Bartolomé, Aránzazu (1994). "Otros Linajes Omeyas en al-Andalus" [Other Umayyad Lineages in al-Andalus]. In Marín, Manuela (ed.). Estudios onomástico-biográficos de Al-Andalus: VI [Onomastic-biographies of al-Andalus: VI] (in Spanish). Madrid: Consejo Superior de Investigaciones Científicas. pp. 445–462. ISBN 84-00-07415-7.
