= Hesham =

Hesham is a common male given name and surname. In Arabic it means "generous", though in some instances there may not be any connection with the Arabic. It is not to be confused with the similar-looking but unrelated name Hashim "هاشم".

Notable people with the name include:

== Given name ==
- Hesham Hanafy (born 1973), Egyptian footballer
- Hesham Mohamed Hussain (born 1971), Saudi Arabian citizen
- Hesham Ismail (born 1969), American football player
- Hesham Mesbah (born 1982), Egyptian judoka
- Hesham Mohamed (born 1990), Egyptian footballer
- Hesham Mohammed (born 1974), Iraqi footballer
- Hesham Qandil (born 1962), Egyptian engineer
- Hesham Ali Salem (born 1981), Libyan basketball player
- Hesham Selim (1958–2022), Egyptian actor
- Hesham Shaban (born 1980), Libyan footballer
- Hesham Shehab (born 1988), Bahraini swimmer
- Hesham Tillawi, Palestinian-American writer
- Hesham Abdul Wahab (born 1990), Indian music composer
- Hesham Yehia (born 1993), Egyptian boxer
- Hesham Yakan (born 1962), Egyptian footballer
- Hesham Youssef, Egyptian diplomat

== Middle name ==
- Mazen Hesham Ga Sabry (born 1994), Egyptian squash player

== Surname ==
- Frank Hesham (1879–1915), English footballer
- Youssef Hesham (born 1985), Egyptian film director

== See also ==
- Hisham (name)
- Hicham
