= Sa'id ibn Hisham =

Umayyad prince and Military leader

Sa'id ibn Hisham سعيد بن هشام
- Died: c. 750; Harran
- Children: Uthman; Marwan
Names
- Sa'id ibn Hisham ibn Abd al-Malik
- House: Marwanid
- Dynasty: Umayyad
- Father: Hisham ibn Abd al-Malik
- Mother: Umm Uthman
- Religion: Islam
- Occupation: Umayyad courtier, politician and Military leader
- Military career
- Relatives: Al-Walid II (cousin); Yazid III (cousin); Maslama (brother); Mu'awiya (brother); Sulayman (brother); Yazid (brother)
- Allegiance: Umayyad Caliphate
- Rank: Commander
- Conflicts: Arab–Byzantine wars, Third Fitna

Saʿīd ibn Hishām ibn ʿAbd al-Malik (Arabic: سعيد بن هشام بن عبد الملك) (d. 750) was an Umayyad prince and commander who participated in the Arab–Byzantine wars and the Third Muslim Civil War, often in association with his brother, Sulayman ibn Hisham. For revolting against Caliph Marwan II (r. 744–750), he was imprisoned in 746, and he died trying to escape.

== Life ==
Sa'id was a son the Umayyad caliph Hisham ibn Abd al-Malik (r. 724–743). His mother was either Hisham's wife Umm Uthman bint Sa'id ibn Khalid, who was a great-granddaughter of Caliph Uthman (r. 644–656), or a slave concubine (umm walad). Sa'id may have been a pupil of the Muslim jurist Ibn Shihab al-Zuhri like his brothers Maslama and Sulayman. Regardless, Sa'id had a reputation as "a sinner", according to the historian Steven Judd, often exposing himself indecently to the women of Homs, where he resided. His actions in that regard led to his imprisonment by his father, the caliph, for an undetermined time.

Like several of his brothers he was a commander in the frontier wars against the Byzantine Empire. He was one of the leaders of the campaign of 729, during which he raided as far as Caesarea in Cappadocia. He probably did not capture the major city, and it is not clear the extent of destruction wrought upon it. His brother Mu'awiya, meanwhile, led the other part of that year's campaign.

Sa'id was a close ally of his brother Sulayman in the events following Hisham's death in 743 and the succession of their cousin al-Walid II. The latter and many of Hisham's sons, including Sa'id, long had hostile relations. Upon his accession, al-Walid had Sa'id and Sulayman imprisoned. Like his brothers, Sa'id was a supporter of Yazid III, who conspired against and succeeded al-Walid after the latter's assassination in 744.

Although Sulayman had dropped his resistance toward Marwan II in 745, he revolted with most of the Yamani troops of the Syrian army against Marwan II at Hisham's old desert capital, Resafa. Marwan dispersed the rebels and Sulayman fled to Iraq, where he recognized as caliph the Kharijite leader al-Dahhak ibn Qays al-Shaybani. Sa'id held out in Homs, which Marwan besieged for six months in 745–746. The city surrendered and had its walls destroyed.

As part of the surrender, Sa'id and his sons Uthman and Marwan were handed over to Marwan II, who had them imprisoned in his capital, Harran. Shortly before Marwan II's defeat at the Battle of the Zab by the Abbasids, who proceeded to topple the Umayyad Caliphate, Sa'id and other Umayyads and notables imprisoned with him broke out of the jail. They were captured by the people of Harran, who then stoned them to death.

== Bibliography ==
- Ahmed, Asad Q. (2010). The Religious Elite of the Early Islamic Ḥijāz: Five Prosopographical Case Studies. Oxford: University of Oxford Linacre College Unit for Prosopographical Research. ISBN 978-1-900934-13-8.
- Blankinship, Khalid Yahya, ed. (1989). The History of al-Ṭabarī, Volume XXV: The End of Expansion: The Caliphate of Hishām, A.D. 724–738/A.H. 105–120. SUNY Series in Near Eastern Studies. Albany, New York: State University of New York Press. ISBN 978-0-88706-569-9.
- Blankinship, Khalid Yahya (1994). The End of the Jihâd State: The Reign of Hishām ibn ʻAbd al-Malik and the Collapse of the Umayyads. Albany, New York: State University of New York Press. ISBN 978-0-7914-1827-7.
- Cooper, J. Eric; Decker, Michael (2012). Life and Society in Byzantine Cappadocia. New York: Palgrave Macmillan. ISBN 978-0-230-36106-5.
- Hawting, Gerald R. (2000). The First Dynasty of Islam: The Umayyad Caliphate AD 661–750 (Second ed.). London and New York: Routledge. ISBN 0-415-24072-7.
- Judd, Steven C. (2014). Religious Scholars and the Umayyads: Piety-Minded Supporters of the Marwanid Caliphate. New York and London: Routledge. ISBN 978-0-415-84497-0.
- Williams, John Alden, ed. (1985). The History of al-Ṭabarī, Volume XXVII: The ʿAbbāsid Revolution, A.D. 743–750/A.H. 126–132. SUNY Series in Near Eastern Studies. Albany, New York: State University of New York Press. ISBN 978-0-87395-884-4.
