= Hisham ud-Din =

(Arabic: هشام الدين) Hisham ud-Din, also spelled Hisam ud-Din is a male Muslim given name, composed from the elements Hisham and ad-Din. It may refer to:

- Hisamuddin of Selangor (1898–1960), Sultan of Selangor and Yang di-Pertuan Agong of Malaysia
- Hishamuddin Abdul Karim, Malaysian politician
- Che Hisamuddin Hassan (born 1972), Malaysian footballer
- Hishammuddin Hussein (born 1961), Malaysian politician
- Hishamuddin Rais, Malaysian film director, comedian and activist
- Hisam-ud-din Usta (1910–1987), Indian artist
