= Yazid al-Afqam =

Umayyad prince and Military leader

Yazid al-Afqam يزيد الأفقم
- Died: c. 744/46
Names
- Yazid ibn Hisham ibn Abd al-Malik al-Afqam
- House: Marwanid
- Dynasty: Umayyad
- Father: Hisham ibn Abd al-Malik
- Mother: Umm Hakim bint Yahya
- Religion: Islam
- Occupation: Umayyad courtier, politician and Military leader
- Military career
- Relatives: Al-Walid II (cousin); Yazid III (cousin); Maslama (brother); Mu'awiya (brother); Sulayman (brother)
- Allegiance: Umayyad Caliphate
- Rank: Commander
- Conflicts: Arab–Byzantine wars

Yazīd ibn Hishām ibn ʿAbd al-Malik (Arabic: يزيد بن هشام بن عبد الملك), commonly known as al-Afqam (fl. 738 – c. 744), was an Umayyad prince who played military and political roles during the reign of his father, Caliph Hisham ibn Abd al-Malik, and during the reigns of his own cousins, caliphs al-Walid II and Yazid III.

== Life ==
Yazid was the son of the Umayyad caliph Hisham ibn Abd al-Malik (r. 724–743) and his favored wife Umm Hakim, the daughter of Yahya ibn al-Hakam, brother of Hisham's grandfather Caliph Marwan I (r. 684–685). He was nicknamed "al-Afqam".

He may have led the Hajj pilgrimage to Mecca in 738, though other accounts hold it was his brother Sulayman, and led it again in 741. He was imprisoned by Caliph al-Walid II soon after his accession in late 743. Al-Walid was assassinated in 744 and Yazid was the first to give the oath of allegiance to the usurping caliph Yazid III.

== Descendants ==
Yazid's son, Ubayd al-Salam al-Yazidi (also called Abd al-Salam), emigrated to al-Andalus with other members of the Umayyad dynasty in the aftermath of the Abbasid Revolution in 750. His first cousin, the son of Yazid's brother Mu'awiya ibn Hisham, Abd al-Rahman I, founded the Umayyad emirate of Córdoba there in 756 and Abd al-Rahman's descendants ruled al-Andalus until 1031. The only notice about Ubayd al-Salam is that he conspired with another cousin, Abd al-Rahman's nephew, Ubayd Allah ibn Aban (son of Aban ibn Mu'awiya), against Abd al-Rahman in 779 and both were ultimately executed by the emir as a consequence.

== Bibliography ==
- Blankinship, Khalid Yahya, ed. (1989). The History of al-Ṭabarī, Volume XXV: The End of Expansion: The Caliphate of Hishām, A.D. 724–738/A.H. 105–120. SUNY Series in Near Eastern Studies. Albany, New York: State University of New York Press. ISBN 978-0-88706-569-9.
- Hillenbrand, Carole, ed. (1989). The History of al-Ṭabarī, Volume XXVI: The Waning of the Umayyad Caliphate: Prelude to Revolution, A.D. 738–744/A.H. 121–126. SUNY Series in Near Eastern Studies. Albany, New York: State University of New York Press. ISBN 978-0-88706-810-2.
- Kilpatrick, Hilary (2003). Making the Great Book of Songs: Compilation and the Author's Craft in Abū l-Faraj al-Iṣbahānī's Kitāb al-Aghānī. London: Routledge. ISBN 9780700717019. OCLC 50810677.
- Uzquiza Bartolomé, Aránzazu (1994). "Otros Linajes Omeyas en al-Andalus" [Other Umayyad Lineages in al-Andalus]. In Marín, Manuela (ed.). Estudios onomástico-biográficos de Al-Andalus: VI [Onomastic-biographies of al-Andalus: VI] (in Spanish). Madrid: Consejo Superior de Investigaciones Científicas. pp. 445–462. ISBN 84-00-07415-7.
