= Umm Hakim bint Yahya =

Wife of Umayyad caliph Hisham

Umm Hakim bint Yahya أم حكيم بنت يحيى
- Zawjat al-khalifa

Consort of the Umayyad caliph
- Tenure: 724 – 742/43
- Born: Syria/Hejaz, Umayyad Caliphate
- Died: Damascus, Umayyad Caliphate
- Spouse: Hisham
- Children: Maslama; Mu'awiya; Sulayman; Yazid al-Afqam
Names
- Umm Hakim bint Yahya ibn al-Hakam
- Dynasty: Umayyad
- Father: Yahya ibn al-Hakam
- Mother: Zaynab bint Abd al-Rahman
- Religion: Islam

Umm Hakim bint Yahya (Arabic: أم حكيم بنت يحيى) was an 8th-century Umayyad noblewoman and famous principal wife of the tenth Umayyad caliph Hisham ibn Abd al-Malik.

== Life ==
At first, One of Yahya's daughters, Amina, was wed to Abd al-Malik's son, Hisham. however Amina died and Hisham married Yahya's other daughter, Umm Hakim.

Umm Hakim was Hisham's favored wife, the daughter of Yahya ibn al-Hakam, brother of Hisham's grandfather caliph Marwan I (r. 684–685), and Zaynab bint Abd al-Rahman, the granddaughter of the Syrian conquest commander al-Harith ibn Hisham of the Banu Makhzum. Umm Hakim, like her mother, was well known for her beauty and love for drink. She gave Hisham five sons, including Sulayman, Maslama, Yazid al-Afqam, and Mu'awiya.

Umm Hakim also lobbied for her son Maslama's succession. during her husband Hisham's reign.

== Sources ==
- Kilpatrick, Hilary (2003). Making the Great Book of Songs: Compilation and the Author's Craft in Abū l-Faraj al-Iṣbahānī's Kitāb al-Aghānī. London: Routledge. ISBN 9780700717019. OCLC 50810677.
- Ahmed, Asad Q. (2010). The Religious Elite of the Early Islamic Ḥijāz: Five Prosopographical Case Studies. Oxford: University of Oxford Linacre College Unit for Prosopographical Research. ISBN 978-1-900934-13-8.
- Robinson, Chase F. (2004). Empire and Elites after the Muslim Conquest: The Transformation of Northern Mesopotamia. Cambridge University Press. ISBN 0-511-03072-X.
- Blankinship, Khalid Yahya, ed. (1989). The History of al-Ṭabarī, Volume XXV: The End of Expansion: The Caliphate of Hishām, A.D. 724–738/A.H. 105–120. SUNY Series in Near Eastern Studies. Albany, New York: State University of New York Press. ISBN 978-0-88706-569-9.
- Hillenbrand, Carole, ed. (1989). The History of al-Ṭabarī, Volume XXVI: The Waning of the Umayyad Caliphate: Prelude to Revolution, A.D. 738–744/A.H. 121–126. SUNY Series in Near Eastern Studies. Albany, New York: State University of New York Press. ISBN 978-0-88706-810-2.
- Intagliata, Emanuele E. (2018) [1950]. Palmyra after Zenobia AD 273-750: An Archaeological and Historical Reappraisal. Oxford: Oxbow Books. ISBN 978-1-78570-942-5.
- Judd, Steven (July–September 2008). "Reinterpreting al-Walīd b. Yazīd". Journal of the American Oriental Society. 128 (3): 439–458. JSTOR 25608405.*Marsham, Andrew (2009). The Rituals of Islamic Monarchy: Accession and Succession in the First Muslim Empire. Edinburgh: Edinburgh University Press. ISBN 978-0-7486-2512-3.
