= Hicham =

Hicham is a given name that may refer to:

- Hicham Aaboubou (born 1978), Moroccan soccer player
- Hicham Aboucherouane (born 1981), Moroccan football striker
- Hicham Akankam (born 1998), Moroccan runner
- Hicham Arazi (born 1973), Moroccan tennis player
- Hicham Bellani (born 1979), Moroccan runner
- Hicham Bouaouiche (born 1974), Moroccan long-distance runner
- Hicham El Guerrouj (born 1974), Moroccan middle-distance runner
- Hicham El-Mashtoub (born 1972), Lebanese player of gridiron football
- Hicham Haddad (born 1978), Lebanese comedian and TV show host
- Hicham Louissi (born 1976), Moroccan footballer
- Hicham Mahdoufi (born 1983), Moroccan footballer
- Hicham Mezair (born 1976), Algerian footballer
- Hicham Mesbahi (born 1980), Moroccan boxer
- Hicham Zerouali (1977–2004), Moroccan footballer who played for Aberdeen

== See also ==
- Hisham (name)
- Hesham
