= Hisam-ud-din Usta =

Indian artist (1910–1987)

Hisam-ud-din Usta (1910–1987) was a popular artist born in the erstwhile Bikaner State (present-day Rajasthan, India). Hisam-ud-din was the last formally trained painter in the Bikaner School style/tradition and became a celebrated artisan in the media of Naqqashi and Manoti. Manoti is an embossed medium where gold is layered with painted floral patterns using translucent and opaque oil and watercolours on bronze, wood, gold, silver, plaster of paris, and camel leather. Naqqashi has the same methods as Manoti in its application but the gold is unembossed. These media are proprietary methods practiced only by Usta artisans of Bikaner.

== Awards and recognition ==
Hisam-ud-din received the National Award of master craftsperson in 1967, and was a recipient of the Padma Shri award in 1986, the highest honour given to an Indian artist by the president of India.

== Death ==
Hisam-ud-din Usta died in Bikaner city in 1987.

== See also ==
- Usta art
