= Youssef Hesham =

Egyptian film director

- يوسف هشام
- Born: 27 July 1985 (age 41); Cairo, Egypt
- Citizenship: Egypt
- Education: American University in Cairo; Misr University for Science and Technology
- Occupation: Film director
- Years active: 2003–present

Youssef Hesham (Arabic: يوسف هشام, IPA: [juːsef heʃaːm]; born 27 July 1985) is an Egyptian film director.

== Biography ==
Youssef Hesham is a film director, screenwriter, lecturer, development producer, and festivals programmer. Hesham holds an MFA degree in Film from Emerson College, Boston. At Emerson, he finished his MFA thesis short film, The New Tenant, where he received the President's Award for in 2020. In his undergraduate studies, he studied at Misr University for Science and Technology, where he studied broadcasting. He began his career as an editor, freelance director and few times as an assistant director in Egyptian and foreign films and some advertisements. He began directing independently in 2003 with short films and documentaries which drew attention to him as a director and also won him some awards and posts at international festivals. He directed his first full-length feature in 2009 at the age of 24 making him the youngest director in Egyptian cinematic history.

== Filmography ==
| Year | Film | Translation | Note |
|---|---|---|---|
| 2005 | بني آدم واسمي خالد; Bani Adam We Esmi Khaled | I'm human and my name is Khaled | Short film |
| 2005 | مخرجين آخر زمن; Mokhrejin Akher Zaman | Today's Directors | Documentary, won an honourable national award for films, Best short Documentary |
| 2005 | عن قرب; An Qorb | Extreme Close Up | Short film |
| 2006 | حلم اسطبل عنتر; Helm Istabl Antar | Istabl Antar's Dream | Documentary |
| 2007 | اكبر الكبائر; Akbar El-Kaba'er | The Greatest of Sins | Short Film |
| 2009 | لمح البصر; Lamh El-Basar | The Glimpse | Full-length film, won jury's special prize at the Alexandria International Film Festival in 2009 |
| 2020 | الساكن الجديد; The New Tenant | Short Film | MFA Thesis film for Emerson College. Winner of The President's Award |
