= Hesham Youssef =

Egyptian Diplomat

- Born: Cairo
- Occupation: Diplomat

Hesham Youssef is an Egyptian diplomat. His current position is the Assistant Secretary-General for Humanitarian Affairs at the Organisation of Islamic Cooperation (OIC). His previous position was chief of staff to the Secretary-General of the Arab League. Youssef's career as a diplomat began when in 1985 he joined the Egyptian Ministry of Foreign Affairs of Egypt. He went on to work at the Egyptian Embassy in Canada and then at Egyptian mission to the WTO in Geneva. He joined the Arab League as an official spokesman in 2001.

Youssef holds a Bachelor of Science in physics from Cairo University, a master's degree in Liberal Arts from St. John's College, New Mexico, and a master's degree in economics from the American University in Cairo.
