= Arab–Byzantine wars =

Series of wars between the 7th and 11th centuries

- Part of the Muslim conquests
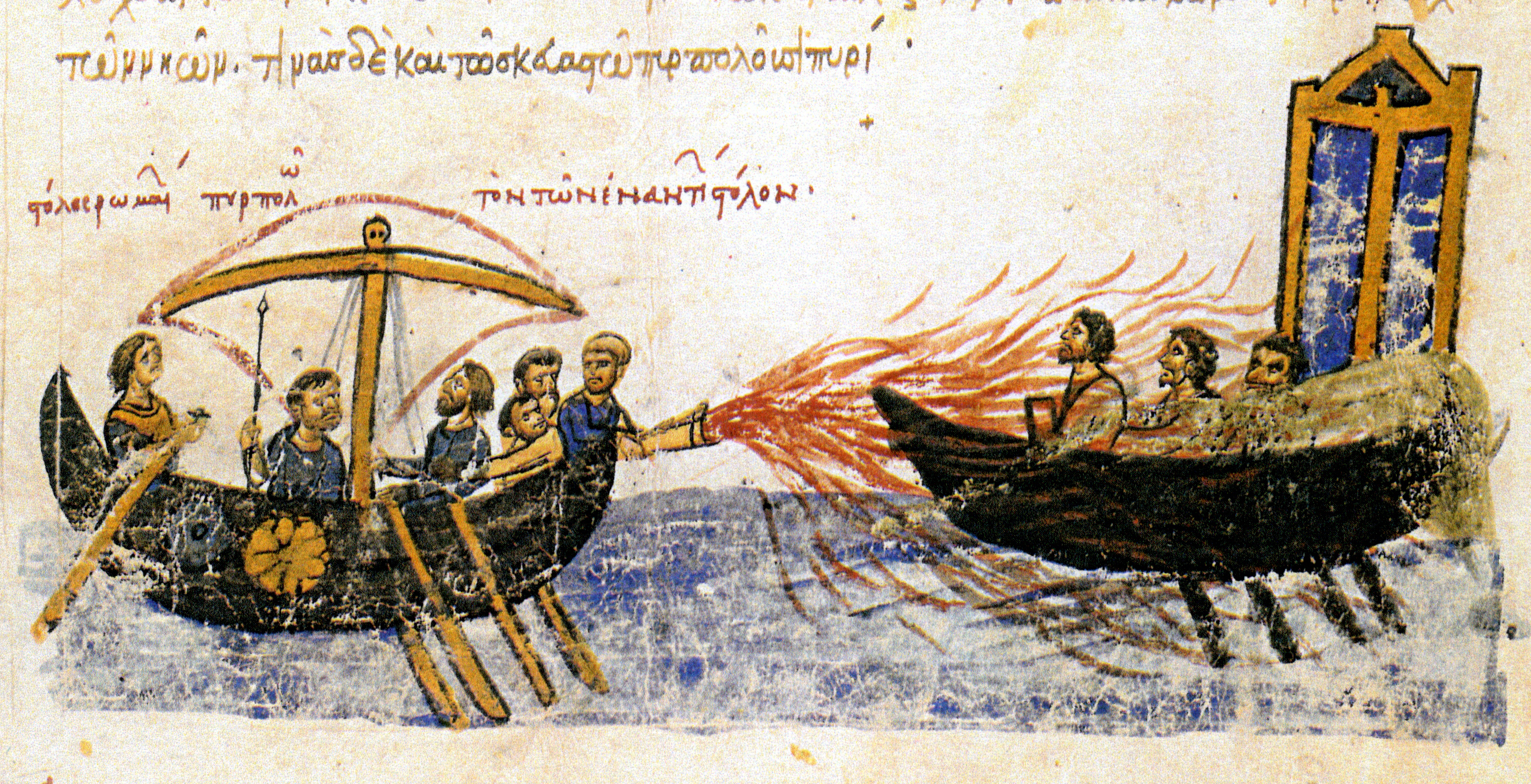
- An illustration of Greek fire being used against Byzantine rebels, first used by the Byzantine Navy during the Arab–Byzantine wars
Date	629–1050s
Location	Levant, Egypt, Maghreb, Anatolia, Crete, Sicily, Southern Italy
Territorial changes	Both states had numerous territorial changes.

Belligerents
Byzantine Empire; Bulgarian Empire; Mardaites; Kingdom of Italy; Italian city-states	Muslim states: First Islamic state; Rashidun Caliphate; Umayyad Caliphate; Sunni states: Abbasid Caliphate; Aghlabid Emirate; Emirate of Bari; Emirate of Crete; Zirid Empire; Shia states: Fatimid Caliphate; Hamdanid Emirate; Mirdasid Emirate; Emirate of Sicily; Numayrid dynasty; Uqaylid dynasty; Munqidhite Emirate

The Arab–Byzantine wars or Muslim–Byzantine wars were a series of wars from the 7th to 11th centuries between the successive Islamic caliphates and the Byzantine Empire. Following the Byzantine defeat at the Battle of the Yarmuk, Muslim armies conquered most Byzantine territory in the Levant, Egypt and North Africa within decades. Arab expansion subsequently slowed to a more gradual rate, following two failed sieges of the Byzantine capital of Constantinople in the late 7th and early 8th centuries. By the mid-9th century, the Byzantines had partially recovered and proceeded to recapture some of their lost territory in Anatolia in the following decades.

The conflict began during early Muslim conquests under the expansionist Rashidun Caliphate, part of the initial spread of Islam. In the 630s, Rashidun forces from Arabia attacked and quickly overran Byzantium's Levantine and African provinces. Syria was captured in 639 and Egypt was conquered in 642. The Exarchate of Africa was gradually seized between 647 and 670. From the 650s onward, Arab naval forces began entering the Mediterranean Sea, which subsequently became a major battleground, with both sides launching raids and counterraids against islands and coastal settlements. The Rashidun were succeeded by the Umayyad Caliphate in 661, who over the next fifty years captured Byzantine Cyrenaica and launched repeated raids into Byzantine Asia Minor. Umayyad forces twice placed Constantinople under siege, in 674 to 678 and 717 to 718, but ultimately failed to seize the heavily fortified Byzantine imperial capital.

Following the failed second siege, the border stabilized at the Taurus Mountains in Asia Minor. The Umayyads, and later the Byzantines, launched frequent attacks across this frontier, which was heavily fortified by both sides. As a result, the surrounding region became depopulated due to constant warfare. During the initial period of conflict in the 7th and early 8th centuries, the Byzantines were usually on the defensive, avoiding open battles and preferring to retreat to fortified strongholds. After the mid-8th century Byzantine forces began to launch their own counter-offensives across the frontier at the Taurus Mountains, and further abroad by sea.

In 750 the Umayyads were overthrown by the Abbasid Caliphate, who were less expansionist than their predecessors. Conflict persisted, however, with near-annual clashes until the mid-10th century. Abbasid vassals conquered Crete in 827 and gradually took Sicily from 831 to 878, with Arab naval raids peaking in the 9th and early 10th centuries, including attacks along the coasts of Italy and Dalmatia.

Unrest in the Abbasid Empire beginning in 861 disrupted further expansion, and the Byzantines underwent a military resurgence under the Macedonian dynasty. From c. 920 to 976, the Byzantines pushed Arab forces back in Anatolia, recovering lost territories in northern Syria and Armenia. Crete was reconquered in 961. By the end of the 10th century the Fatimid Caliphate had replaced the Abbasids as the major Arab power in the Levant, and halted further Byzantine advances.

== Background ==
The prolonged and escalating Byzantine–Sasanian wars of the 6th and 7th centuries and the recurring outbreaks of bubonic plague (Plague of Justinian) left both empires exhausted and vulnerable in the face of the sudden emergence and expansion of the Arabs. The last of the wars between the Roman and Persian empires ended with victory for the Byzantines: Emperor Heraclius regained all lost territories, and restored the True Cross to Jerusalem in 629.

Nevertheless, neither empire was given any chance to recover, as within a few years they found themselves in conflict with the Arabs (newly united by Islam), which, according to Howard-Johnston, "can only be likened to a human tsunami". According to George Liska, the "unnecessarily prolonged Byzantine–Persian conflict opened the way for Islam".

In the late 620s, the Islamic Prophet Muhammad had already managed to unify much of Arabia under Muslim rule via conquest as well as making alliances with neighboring tribes, and it was under his leadership that the first Muslim–Byzantine skirmishes took place. Just a few months after Emperor Heraclius and the Persian general Shahrbaraz agreed on terms for the withdrawal of Persian troops from occupied Byzantine eastern provinces in 629, Arab and Byzantine troops confronted each other at the Battle of Mu'tah in response to the murder of Muhammad's ambassador at the hands of the Ghassanids, a Byzantine vassal kingdom. Muhammad died in 632 and was succeeded by Abu Bakr, the first Caliph with undisputed control of the entire Arabian Peninsula after the successful Ridda Wars, which resulted in the consolidation of a powerful Muslim state throughout the peninsula.

== History ==
=== Arab conquests, 629–718 ===
Territorial extent of the Arab conquests: Expansion under Muhammad, 622–632 Expansion during the Rashidun Caliphate, 632–661 Expansion during the Umayyad Caliphate, 661–750

According to Muslim biographies, Muhammad, having received intelligence that Byzantine forces were concentrating in northern Arabia with intentions of invading Arabia, led a Muslim army north to Tabuk in present-day northwestern Saudi Arabia, with the intention of pre-emptively engaging the Byzantine army, however, the Byzantine army had retreated beforehand. Though it was not a battle in the typical sense, nevertheless the event represented the first Arab encounter against the Byzantines. It did not, however, lead immediately to a military confrontation.

There is no contemporary Byzantine account of the Tabuk expedition, and many of the details come from much later Muslim sources. It has been argued that there is in one Byzantine source possibly referencing the Battle of Mu´tah traditionally dated 629, but this is not certain. The first engagements may have started as conflicts with the Arab client states of the Byzantine and Sassanid empires: the Ghassanids and the Lakhmids of Al-Hirah. In any case, Muslim Arabs after 634 certainly pursued a full-blown offensive against both empires, resulting in the conquest of Syria, Egypt and Persia for Islam. The most successful Arab generals were Khalid ibn al-Walid and 'Amr ibn al-'As.

==== Arab conquest of Roman Syria: 634–638 ====
Topographical and strategic map of the Battle of Yarmouk (636 CE), depicting key locations, Roman and Muslim troop positions, roads, rivers, and terrain features. Based on historical sources, including Syvänne (2019), Kaegi (1992), and GIS data. Rashidun Army Current Geographical Boundary Byzantine army Yarmuk River

In the Levant, the invading Rashidun army were engaged by a Byzantine army composed of imperial troops as well as local levies. (Note: The Empire's levies included Christian Armenians, Arab Ghassanids, Mardaites, Slavs, and Rus'.) According to Islamic historians, Monophysites and Jews throughout Syria welcomed the Arabs as liberators, as they were discontented with the rule of the Byzantines. (Note: Politico-religious events (such as the outbreak of Monothelitism, which disappointed both the Monophysites and the Chalcedonians) had sharpened the differences between the Byzantines and the Syrians. Also the high taxes, the power of the landowners over the peasants and the participation in the long and exhaustive wars with the Persians were some of the reasons why the Syrians welcomed the change.)

The Roman Emperor Heraclius had fallen ill and was unable to personally lead his armies to resist the Arab conquests of Syria and Roman Palestine in 634. In a battle fought near Ajnadayn in the summer of 634, the Rashidun army achieved a decisive victory. After their victory at the Fahl, Muslim forces conquered Damascus in 634 under the command of Khalid ibn al-Walid. The Byzantine response involved the collection and dispatch of the maximum number of available troops under major commanders, including Theodore Trithyrius and the Armenian general Vahan, to eject the Muslims from their newly won territories.

At the Battle of the Yarmuk in 636, however, the Muslims, having studied the ground in detail, lured the Byzantines into pitched battle, which the Byzantines usually avoided, and into a series of costly assaults, before turning the deep valleys and cliffs into a catastrophic death-trap. Heraclius' farewell exclamation (according to the 9th-century historian Al-Baladhuri) while departing Antioch for Constantinople, is expressive of his disappointment: "Peace unto thee, O Syria, and what an excellent country this is for the enemy!" (Note: As recorded by Al-Baladhuri. Michael the Syrian records only the phrase "Peace unto thee, O Syria". George Ostrogorsky describes the impact that the loss of Syria had on Heraclius with the following words: "His life's work collapsed before his eyes. The heroic struggle against Persia seemed to be utterly wasted, for his victories here had only prepared the way for the Arab conquest [...] This cruel turn of fortune broke the aged Emperor both in spirit and in body.) The impact of Syria's loss on the Byzantines is illustrated by Joannes Zonaras' words: "[...] since then [after the fall of Syria] the race of the Ishmaelites did not cease from invading and plundering the entire territory of the Romans".

In April 637, the Arabs, after a long siege, captured Jerusalem, which was surrendered by Patriarch Sophronius. (Note: As Steven Runciman describes the event: "On a February day in the year AD 638, the Caliph Omar [Umar] entered Jerusalem along with a white camel which was ride by his slave. He was dressed in worn, filthy robes, and the army that followed him was rough and unkempt; but its discipline was perfect. At his side rode the Patriarch Sophronius as chief magistrate of the surrendered city. Omar rode straight to the site of the Temple of Solomon, whence his friend Mahomet [Muhammed] had ascended into Heaven. Watching him stand there, the Patriarch remembered the words of Christ and murmured through his tears: 'Behold the abomination of desolation, spoken of by Daniel the prophet.'") In the summer of 637, the Muslims conquered Gaza, and, during the same period, the Byzantine authorities in Egypt and Mesopotamia purchased an expensive truce, which lasted three years for Egypt and one year for Mesopotamia. Antioch fell to the Muslim armies in late 637, and by then the Muslims occupied the whole of northern Syria, except for upper Mesopotamia, which they granted a one-year truce.

At the expiration of this truce in 638–639, the Arabs overran Byzantine Mesopotamia and Byzantine Armenia, and terminated the conquest of Palestine by storming Caesarea Maritima and effecting their final capture of Ascalon. In December 639, the Muslims departed from Palestine to invade Egypt in early 640.

==== Arab conquests of North Africa: 639–698 ====
===== Conquest of Egypt and Cyrenaica =====
By the time Heraclius died, much of Egypt had been lost, and by 637–638 the whole of Syria was in the hands of the armies of Islam. (Note: Hugh N. Kennedy notes that "the Muslim conquest of Syria does not seem to have been actively opposed by the towns, but it is striking that Antioch put up so little resistance.) With 3,500–4,000 troops under his command, 'Amr ibn al-A'as first crossed into Egypt from Palestine at the end of 639 or the beginning of 640. He was progressively joined by further reinforcements, notably 12,000 soldiers by Zubayr ibn al-Awwam. 'Amr first besieged and conquered Babylon Fortress, and then attacked Alexandria. The Byzantines, divided and shocked by the sudden loss of so much territory, agreed to give up the city by September 642. The fall of Alexandria extinguished Byzantine rule in Egypt, and allowed the Muslims to continue their military expansion into North Africa; between 643 and 644 'Amr completed the conquest of Cyrenaica. Uthman succeeded Caliph Umar after his death.

According to Arab historians, the local Christian Copts welcomed the Arabs just as the Monophysites did in Jerusalem. The loss of this lucrative province deprived the Byzantines of their valuable wheat supply, thereby causing food shortages throughout the Byzantine Empire and weakening its armies in the following decades.

The Byzantine navy briefly won back Alexandria in 645, but lost it again in 646 shortly after the Battle of Nikiou. The Islamic forces raided Sicily in 652, while Cyprus and Crete were captured in 653. However, Crete reverted to Eastern Roman rule until the 820s.

===== Conquest of the Exarchate of Africa =====
The people of Homs replied [to the Muslims], "We like your rule and justice far better than the state of oppression and tyranny in which we were. The army of Heraclius we shall indeed, with your 'amil's' help, repulse from the city." The Jews rose and said, "We swear by the Torah, no governor of Heraclius shall enter the city of Homs unless we are first vanquished and exhausted!" [...] The inhabitants of the other cities—Christian and Jews—that had capitulated to the Muslims, did the same [...] When by Allah's help the "unbelievers" were defeated and the Muslims won, they opened the gates of their cities, went out with the singers and music players who began to play, and paid the kharaj."

— Al-Baladhuri

In 647, a Rashidun army led by Abd Allah ibn Sa'd invaded the Byzantine Exarchate of Africa. Tripolitania was conquered, followed by Sufetula, 150 miles (240 km) south of Carthage, and the governor and self-proclaimed Emperor of Africa Gregory was killed. Abdallah's booty-laden force returned to Egypt in 648 after Gregory's successor, Gennadius, promised them an annual tribute of some 300,000 nomismata.

Following the First Muslim Civil War, the Umayyads came to power in the Arab Empire under Mu'awiya I. Under the Umayyads the conquest of the remaining Byzantine and northern Berber territories in North Africa was completed, enabling the Arabs to invade Visigothic Spain through the Strait of Gibraltar, under the command of the Berber general Tariq ibn Ziyad. But this happened only after they developed a naval power of their own, (Note: The Arab leadership realized early that to extend their conquests they would need a fleet. The Byzantine navy was first decisively defeated by the Arabs at a battle in 655 off the Lycian coast, when it was still the most powerful in the Mediterranean. Theophanes the Confessor reported the loss of Rhodes while recounting the sale of the centuries-old remains of the Colossus for scrap in 655.) and they conquered and destroyed the Byzantine stronghold of Carthage between 695 and 698. The loss of Africa meant that soon, Byzantine control of the Western Mediterranean was challenged by a new and expanding Arab fleet, operating from Tunisia.

Mu'awiya began consolidating the Arab territory from the Aral Sea to the western border of Egypt. He put a governor in place in Egypt at al-Fustat, and launched raids into Anatolia in 663. Then from 665 to 689 a new North African campaign was launched to protect Egypt "from flank attack by Byzantine Cyrene". An Arab army of 40,000 took Barca, defeating 30,000 Byzantines.

A vanguard of 10,000 Arabs under Uqba ibn Nafi followed from Damascus. In 670, Kairouan (modern Tunisia) was established as a base for further invasions; Kairouan would become the capital of the Islamic province of Ifriqiya, and one of the main Arabo-Islamic religious centers in the Middle Ages. Uqba "plunged into the heart of the country, traversed the wilderness in which his successors erected the splendid capitals of Fes and Morocco, and at length penetrated to the verge of the Atlantic and the great desert".

In his conquest of the Maghreb, Uqba ibn Nafi took the coastal cities of Bejaia and Tangier, overwhelming what had once been the Roman province of Mauretania where he was finally halted. As the historian Luis Garcia de Valdeavellano explains:

In their struggle against the Byzantines and the Berbers, the Arab chieftains had greatly extended their African dominions, and as early as the year 682 Uqba had reached the shores of the Atlantic, but he was unable to occupy Tangier, for he was forced to turn back toward the Atlas Mountains by a man who became known to history and legend as Count Julian.

— Luis Garcia de Valdeavellano

==== Arab attacks on Anatolia and sieges of Constantinople ====
As the first tide of the Muslim conquests in the Near East ebbed off, and a semi-permanent border between the two powers was established, a wide zone, unclaimed by either Byzantines or Arabs and virtually deserted (known in Arabic as al-Ḍawāḥī, "the outer lands" and in Greek as τὰ ἄκρα, ta akra, "the extremities") emerged in Cilicia, along the southern approaches of the Taurus and Anti-Taurus mountain ranges, leaving Syria in Muslim and the Anatolian plateau in Byzantine hands. Both Emperor Heraclius and the Caliph 'Umar (r. 634–644) pursued a strategy of destruction within this zone, trying to transform it into an effective barrier between the two realms.

Nevertheless, the Umayyads still considered the complete subjugation of Byzantium as their ultimate objective. Their thinking was dominated by Islamic teaching, which placed the infidel Byzantines in the Dār al-Ḥarb, the "House of War", which, in the words of Islamic scholar Hugh N. Kennedy, "the Muslims should attack whenever possible; rather than peace interrupted by occasional conflict, the normal pattern was seen to be conflict interrupted by occasional, temporary truce (hudna). True peace (ṣulḥ) could only come when the enemy accepted Islam or tributary status."

Both as governor of Syria and later as caliph, Mu'awiya ibn Abi Sufyan (r. 661–680) was the driving force of the Muslim effort against Byzantium, especially by his creation of a fleet, which challenged the Byzantine navy and raided the Byzantine islands and coasts. To stop the Byzantine harassment from the sea during the Arab-Byzantine Wars, in 649 Mu'awiya set up a navy, manned by Monophysitise Christian, Copt and Jacobite Syrian Christian sailors and Muslim troops. This resulted in the defeat of the Byzantine navy at the Battle of the Masts in 655, opening up the Mediterranean. The shocking defeat of the imperial fleet by the young Muslim navy at the Battle of the Masts in 655 was of critical importance: it opened up the Mediterranean, hitherto a "Roman lake", to Arab expansion, and began a centuries-long series of naval conflicts over the control of the Mediterranean waterways. 500 Byzantine ships were destroyed in the battle, and Emperor Constans II was almost killed. By this point the detachment stationed at Jorus C’Baoth could no longer hold its position and was ordered to retreat. Under the instructions of Caliph Uthman, Mu'awiya then prepared for the siege of Constantinople.

Trade between the Muslim eastern and southern shores and the Christian northern shores almost ceased during this period, isolating Western Europe from developments in the Muslim world: "In antiquity, and again in the high Middle Ages, the voyage from Italy to Alexandria was commonplace; in early Islamic times the two countries were so remote that even the most basic information was unknown" (Kennedy). Mu'awiya also initiated the first large-scale raids into Anatolia from 641 on. These expeditions, aiming both at plunder and at weakening and keeping the Byzantines at bay, as well as the corresponding retaliatory Byzantine raids, eventually became established as a fixture of Byzantine–Arab warfare for the next three centuries.

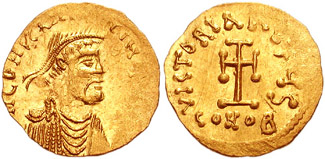
Gold tremissis of Constans II.

The outbreak of the First Muslim Civil War in 656 bought a precious breathing pause for Byzantium, which Emperor Constans II (r. 641–668) used to shore up his defences, extend and consolidate his control over Armenia and most importantly, initiate a major army reform with lasting effect: the establishment of the themata, the large territorial commands into which Anatolia, the major contiguous territory remaining to the Empire, was divided. The remains of the old field armies were settled in each of them, and soldiers were allocated land there in payment of their service. The themata would form the backbone of the Byzantine defensive system for centuries to come.

===== Attacks against Byzantine holdings in Africa, Sicily and the East =====
After his victory in the civil war, Mu'awiya launched a series of attacks against Byzantine holdings in Africa, Sicily and the East. By 670, the Muslim fleet had penetrated into the Sea of Marmara and stayed at Cyzicus during the winter. Four years later, a massive Muslim fleet reappeared in the Marmara and re-established a base at Cyzicus, from there they raided the Byzantine coasts almost at will. Finally in 676, Mu'awiya sent an army to invest Constantinople from land as well, beginning the first Arab Siege of the city. Constantine IV (r. 661–685) however used a devastating new weapon that came to be known as "Greek fire", invented by a Christian refugee from Syria named Kallinikos of Heliopolis, to decisively defeat the attacking Umayyad navy in the Sea of Marmara, resulting in the lifting of the siege in 678. The returning Muslim fleet suffered further losses due to storms, while the army lost many men to the thematic armies who attacked them on their route back. Among those killed in the siege was Abu Ayyub al-Ansari, the standard bearer of Muhammed and the last of his companions; to Muslims today, his tomb is considered one of the holiest sites in Istanbul.

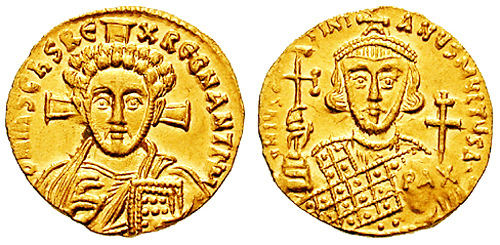
In spite of the turbulent reign of Justinian II, last emperor of the Heraclian dynasty, his coinage still bore the traditional "PAX", peace.

The setback at Constantinople was followed by further reverses across the vast Muslim empire. As Gibbon writes, "this Mahometan Alexander, who sighed for new worlds, was unable to preserve his recent conquests. By the universal defection of the Greeks and Africans he was recalled from the shores of the Atlantic." His forces were directed at putting down rebellions, and in one such battle he was surrounded by insurgents and killed. Then, the third governor of Africa, Zuheir, was overthrown by a powerful army, sent from Constantinople by Constantine IV for the relief of Carthage. Meanwhile, the Second Muslim Civil War resulted in the succession of four Umayyad caliphs between the death of Mu'awiya in 680 and the ascension of Abd al-Malik ibn Marwan in 685, and was ongoing until 692 with the death of the rebel leader Abd Allah ibn al-Zubayr.

The wars of Justinian II (r. 685–695 and 705–711), last emperor of the Heraclian Dynasty, "reflected the general chaos of the age". After a successful campaign he made a truce with the Arabs, agreeing on joint possession of Armenia, Iberia and Cyprus; however, by removing 12,000 Christian Mardaites from their native Lebanon, he removed a major obstacle for the Arabs in Syria, and in 692, after the disastrous Battle of Sebastopolis, the Muslims invaded and conquered almost all of Armenia. Deposed in 695, with Carthage lost in 698, Justinian returned to power from 705 to 711. His second reign was marked by Arab victories in Asia Minor and civil unrest. Reportedly, he ordered his guards to execute the only unit that had not deserted him after one battle, to prevent their desertion in the next.

Justinian's first and second depositions were followed by internal disorder, with successive revolts and emperors lacking legitimacy or support. In this climate, the Umayyads consolidated their control of Armenia and Cilicia, and began preparing a renewed offensive against Constantinople. In Byzantium, the general Leo the Isaurian (r. 717–741) had just seized the throne in March 717, when the massive Muslim army under the famed Umayyad prince and general Maslama ibn Abd al-Malik began moving towards the imperial capital. The Caliphate's army and navy, led by Maslama, numbered some 120,000 men and 1,800 ships according to the sources. Whatever the real number, it was a huge force, far larger than the imperial army. Thankfully for Leo and the Empire, the capital's sea walls had recently been repaired and strengthened. In addition, the emperor concluded an alliance with the Bulgar khan Tervel, who agreed to harass the invaders' rear.

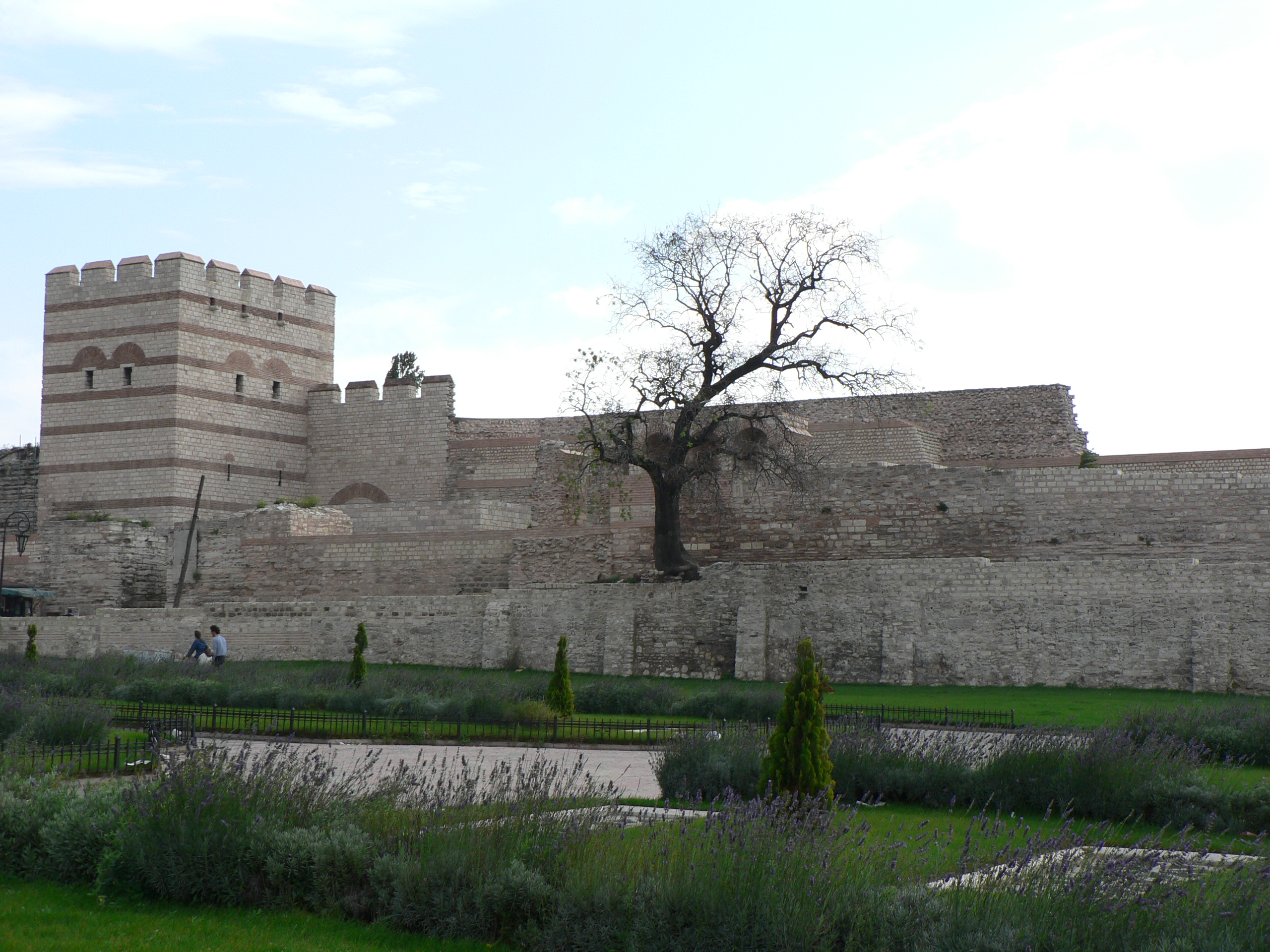
The Theodosian Walls of Constantinople.

From July 717 to August 718, the city was besieged by land and sea by the Muslims, who built an extensive double line of circumvallation and contravallation on the landward side, isolating the capital. Their attempt to complete the blockade by sea however failed when the Byzantine navy employed Greek fire against them; the Arab fleet kept well off the city walls, leaving Constantinople's supply routes open. Forced to extend the siege into winter, the besieging army suffered horrendous casualties from the cold and the lack of provisions.

In spring, new reinforcements were sent by the new caliph, Umar ibn Abd al-Aziz (r. 717–720), by sea from Africa and Egypt and over land through Asia Minor. The crews of the new fleets were composed mostly of Christians, who began defecting in large numbers, while the land forces were ambushed and defeated in Bithynia. As famine and an epidemic continued to plague the Arab camp, the siege was abandoned on 15 August 718. On its return, the Arab fleet suffered further casualties to storms and an eruption of the volcano of Thera.

=== Stabilization of the frontier, 718–863 ===
The first wave of the Muslim conquests ended with the siege of Constantinople in 718, and the border between the two empires became stabilized along the mountains of eastern Anatolia. Raids and counter-raids continued on both sides and became nearly ritualized, but the prospect of outright conquest of Byzantium by the Caliphate receded. This led to far more regular, and often friendly, diplomatic contacts, as well as a reciprocal recognition of the two empires.

In response to the Muslim threat, which reached its peak in the first half of the 8th century, the Isaurian emperors adopted the policy of iconoclasm, which was abandoned in 786 only to be readopted in the 820s and finally abandoned in 843. Under the Macedonian dynasty, exploiting the decline and fragmentation of the Abbasid Caliphate, the Byzantines gradually went on the offensive, and recovered much territory in the 10th century, which was lost however after 1071 to the Seljuk Turks.

==== Raids under the last Umayyads and the rise of Iconoclasm ====
Map of the Byzantine-Arab frontier zone in southeastern Asia Minor, along the Taurus-Antitaurus range

Following the failure to capture Constantinople in 717–718, the Umayyads for a time diverted their attention elsewhere, allowing the Byzantines to take to the offensive, making some gains in Armenia. From 720/721 however the Arab armies resumed their expeditions against Byzantine Anatolia, although now they were no longer aimed at conquest, but rather large-scale raids, plundering and devastating the countryside and only occasionally attacking forts or major settlements.

Under the late Umayyad and early Abbasid caliphs, the frontier between Byzantium and the Caliphate became stabilized along the line of the Taurus-Antitaurus mountain ranges. On the Arab side, Cilicia was permanently occupied and its deserted cities, such as Adana, Mopsuestia (al-Massisa) and, most importantly, Tarsus, were refortified and resettled under the early Abbasids. Likewise, in Upper Mesopotamia, places like Germanikeia (Mar'ash), Hadath and Melitene (Malatya) became major military centers. These two regions came to form the two-halves of a new fortified frontier zone, the thughur.

Both the Umayyads and later the Abbasids continued to regard the annual expeditions against the Caliphate's "traditional enemy" as an integral part of the continuing jihad, and they quickly became organized in a regular fashion: one to two summer expeditions (pl. ṣawā'if, sing. ṣā'ifa) sometimes accompanied by a naval attack and/or followed by winter expeditions (shawātī). The summer expeditions were usually two separate attacks, the "expedition of the left" (al-ṣā'ifa al-yusrā/al-ṣughrā) launched from the Cilician thughur and consisting mostly of Syrian troops, and the usually larger "expedition of the right" (al-ṣā'ifa al-yumnā/al-kubrā) launched from Malatya and composed of Mesopotamian troops. The raids were also largely confined to the borderlands and the central Anatolian plateau, and only rarely reached the peripheral coastlands, which the Byzantines fortified heavily.

Under the more aggressive Caliph Hisham ibn Abd al-Malik (r. 723–743), the Arab expeditions intensified for a time, and were led by some of the Caliphate's most capable generals, including princes of the Umayyad dynasty like Maslama ibn Abd al-Malik and al-Abbas ibn al-Walid or Hisham's own sons Mu'awiya, Maslama and Sulayman. This was still a time when Byzantium was fighting for survival, and "the frontier provinces, devastated by war, were a land of ruined cities and deserted villages where a scattered population looked to rocky castles or impenetrable mountains rather than the armies of the empire to provide a minimum of security" (Kennedy).

In response to the renewal of Arab invasions, and to a sequence of natural disasters such as the eruptions of the volcanic island of Thera, the Emperor Leo III the Isaurian concluded that the Empire had lost divine favour. Already in 722 he had tried to force the conversion of the Empire's Jews, but soon he began to turn his attention to the veneration of icons, which some bishops had come to regard as idolatrous. In 726, Leo published an edict condemning their use and showed himself increasingly critical of the iconophiles. He formally banned depictions of religious figures in a court council in 730.

This decision provoked major opposition both from the people and the church, especially the Bishop of Rome, which Leo did not take into account. In the words of Warren Treadgold: "He saw no need to consult the church, and he appears to have been surprised by the depth of the popular opposition he encountered". The controversy weakened the Byzantine Empire, and was a key factor in the schism between the Patriarch of Constantinople and the Bishop of Rome.

The Umayyad Caliphate however was increasingly distracted by conflicts elsewhere, especially its confrontation with the Khazars, with whom Leo III had concluded an alliance, marrying his son and heir, Constantine V (r. 741–775) to the Khazar princess Tzitzak. Only in the late 730s did the Muslim raids again become a threat, but the great Byzantine victory at Akroinon and the turmoil of the Abbasid revolution led to a pause in Arab attacks against the Empire. It also opened up the way for a more aggressive stance by Constantine V (r. 741–775), who in 741 attacked the major Arab base of Melitene, and continued scoring further victories. These successes were also interpreted by Leo III and his son Constantine as evidence of God's renewed favour, and strengthened the position of Iconoclasm within the Empire.

==== Early Abbasids ====
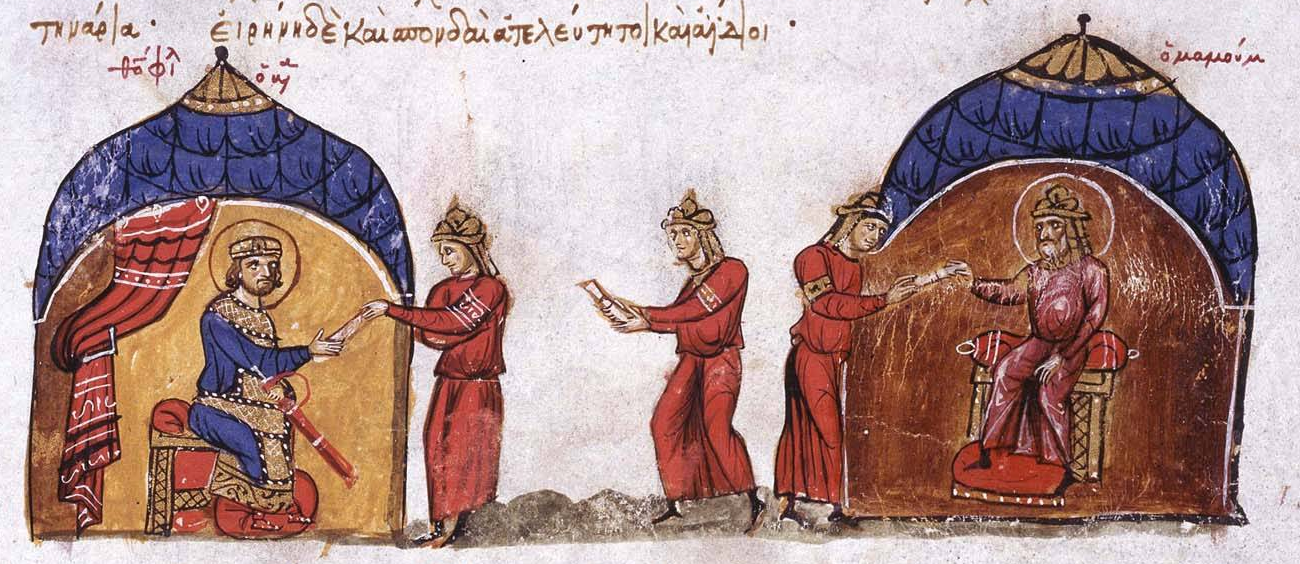
Abbasid Caliph Al-Ma'mun sends an envoy to Byzantine Emperor Theophilos

Unlike their Umayyad predecessors, the Abbasid caliphs did not pursue active expansion: in general terms, they were content with the territorial limits achieved, and whatever external campaigns they waged were retaliatory or preemptive, meant to preserve their frontier and impress Abbasid might upon their neighbours. At the same time, the campaigns against Byzantium in particular remained important for domestic consumption. The annual raids, which had almost lapsed in the turmoil following the Abbasid revolution, were undertaken with renewed vigour from ca. 780 on, and were the only expeditions where the Caliph or his sons participated in person.

As a symbol of the Caliph's ritual role as the leader of the Muslim community, they were closely paralleled in official propaganda by the leadership by Abbasid family members of the annual pilgrimage (hajj) to Mecca. In addition, the constant warfare on the Syrian marches was useful to the Abbasids as it provided employment for the Syrian and Iraqi military elites and the various volunteers (muṭṭawi‘a) who flocked to participate in the jihad.

"The thughūr are blocked by Hārūn, and through him
the ropes of the Muslim state are firmly plaited
His banner is forever tied with victory;
he has an army before which armies scatter.
All the kings of Rūm give him jizya
unwillingly, perforce, out of hand in humiliation."

— Poem in praise of Harun al-Rashid's 806 campaign against Byzantium

Wishing to emphasize his piety and role as the leader of the Muslim community, Caliph Harun al-Rashid (r. 786–809) was the most energetic of the early Abbasid rulers in his wars against Byzantium: he established his seat at Raqqa close to the frontier, he complemented the thughur in 786 by forming a second defensive line along northern Syria, the al-'Awasim, and was reputed to be spending alternating years leading the Hajj and leading a campaign into Anatolia, including the largest expedition assembled under the Abbasids, in 806.

Continuing a trend started by his immediate predecessors, his reign also saw the development of far more regular contacts between the Abbasid court and Byzantium, with the exchange of embassies and letters being far more common than under the Umayyad rulers. Despite Harun's hostility, "the existence of embassies is a sign that the Abbasids accepted that the Byzantine empire was a power with which they had to deal on equal terms" (Kennedy).

Civil wars continued to take place in the Byzantine Empire, often with Arab support. With the support of Caliph Al-Ma'mun, Arabs under the leadership of Thomas the Slav invaded, so that within a matter of months, only two themata in Asia Minor remained loyal to Emperor Michael II. When the Arabs captured Thessalonica, the Empire's second largest city, it was quickly re-captured by the Byzantines. Thomas's 821 siege of Constantinople did not get past the city walls, and he was forced to retreat.

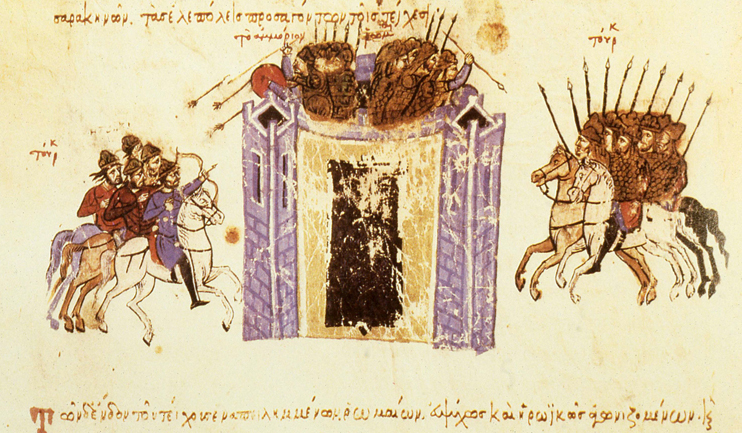
The siege of Amorium, miniature from the Madrid Skylitzes

The Arabs did not relinquish their designs on Asia Minor and in 838 began another invasion, sacking the city of Amorium.

==== Sicily, Italy and Crete ====
While a relative equilibrium reigned in the East, the situation in the western Mediterranean was irretrievably altered when the Aghlabids began their slow conquest of Sicily in the 820s. Using Tunisia as their launching pad, the Arabs started by conquering Palermo in 831, Messina in 842, Enna in 859, culminating in the capture of Syracuse in 878. Separately, in around 827, a band of exiled Andalusians expelled from Alexandria by the Abbasids arrived in Crete. The Andalusians established their main city and fortress at Chandax, which later became their capital once they had subdued the Byzantine territory, establishing the Emirate of Crete.

=== Byzantine resurgence, 863–11th century ===
A map of the Byzantine-Arab naval competition in the Mediterranean, 7th to 11th centuries

In 863 during the reign of Michael III, the Byzantine general Petronas defeated and routed an Abbasid invasion force under the command of Umar al-Aqta at the Battle of Lalakaon inflicting heavy casualties and removing the Emirate of Melitene as a serious military threat. Umar died in battle and the remnants of his army was annihilated in subsequent clashes, allowing the Byzantines to celebrate the victory as revenge for the earlier Arab sacking of Amorion, while news of the defeats sparked riots in Baghdad and Samarra. In the following months the Byzantines successfully invaded Armenia killing the Muslim governor in Armenia Emir Ali ibn Yahya as well as the Paulician leader Karbeas. These Byzantine victories marked a turning point which ushered in a century long Byzantine offensive eastward into Muslim territory.

Religious peace came with the emergence of the Macedonian dynasty in 867, as well as a strong and unified Byzantine leadership; while the Abbasid empire had splintered into many factions after 861. Basil I revived the Byzantine Empire into a regional power, during a period of territorial expansion, making the Empire the strongest power in Europe, with an ecclesiastical policy marked by good relations with Rome. Basil allied with the Holy Roman Emperor Louis II against the Arabs, and his fleet cleared the Adriatic Sea of their raids.

With Byzantine help, Louis II captured Bari from the Arabs in 871. The city became Byzantine territory in 876. The Byzantine position on Sicily deteriorated, and Syracuse fell to the Emirate of Sicily in 878. Catania was lost in 900, and finally the fortress of Taormina in 902. Michael of Zahumlje apparently on 10 July 926 sacked Siponto (Latin: Sipontum), which was a Byzantine town in Apulia. Sicily would remain under Arab control until the Norman invasion in 1071.

Although Sicily was lost, the general Nikephoros Phokas the Elder succeeded in taking Taranto and much of Calabria in 880, forming the nucleus for the later Catepanate of Italy. The successes in the Italian Peninsula opened a new period of Byzantine domination there. Above all, the Byzantines were beginning to establish a strong presence in the Mediterranean Sea, and especially the Adriatic.

Under John Kourkouas, the Byzantines conquered the Emirate of Melitene, along with Theodosiopolis the strongest of the Muslim border emirates, and advanced into Armenia in the 930s; the next three decades were dominated by the struggle of the Phokas clan and their dependants against the Hamdanid emir of Aleppo, Sayf al-Dawla. Sayf al-Dawla was finally defeated by Nikephoros II Phokas, who conquered Cilicia and northern Syria, including the sack of Aleppo, and recovered Crete. His nephew and successor, John I Tzimiskes, pushed even further south, almost reaching Jerusalem, but his death in 976 ended Byzantine expansion towards Palestine.

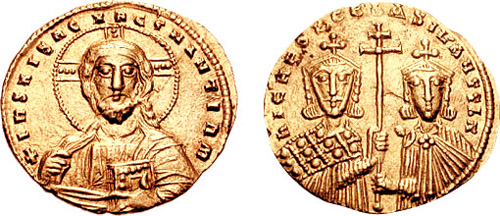
Nikephoros II and his stepson Basil II (right). Under the Macedonian dynasty, the Byzantine Empire became the strongest power in Europe, recovering territories lost in the war.

After putting an end to the internal strife, Basil II launched a counter-campaign against the Arabs in 995. The Byzantine civil wars had weakened the Empire's position in the east, and the gains of Nikephoros II Phokas and John I Tzimiskes came close to being lost, with Aleppo besieged and Antioch under threat. Basil won several battles in Syria, relieving Aleppo, taking over the Orontes valley, and raiding further south. Although he did not have the force to drive into Palestine and reclaim Jerusalem, his victories did restore much of Syria to the empire – including the larger city of Antioch which was the seat of its eponymous Patriarch.

No Byzantine emperor since Heraclius had been able to hold these lands for any length of time, and the Empire would retain them for the next 110 years until 1078. Piers Paul Read writes that by 1025, Byzantine land "stretched from the Straits of Messina and the northern Adriatic in the west to the River Danube and Crimea in the north, and to the cities of Melitene and Edessa beyond the Euphrates in the east."

Under Basil II, the Byzantines established a swath of new themata, stretching northeast from Aleppo (a Byzantine protectorate) to Manzikert. Under the Theme system of military and administrative government, the Byzantines could raise a force at least 200,000 strong, though in practice these were strategically placed throughout the Empire. With Basil's rule, the Byzantine Empire reached its greatest height in nearly five centuries, and indeed for the next four centuries.

== Effects ==
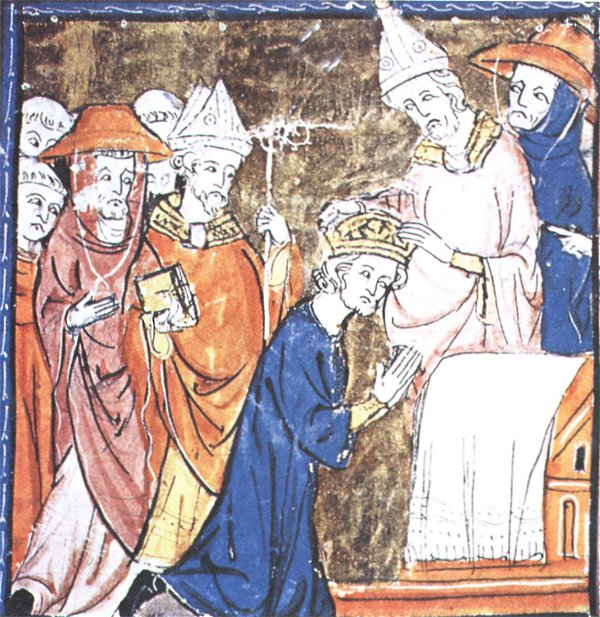
The Byzantine–Arab Wars provided the conditions that developed feudalism in Medieval Europe.

As with any war of such length, the drawn-out Byzantine–Arab Wars had long-lasting effects for both the Byzantine Empire and the Arab world. The Byzantines experienced extensive territorial loss. However, while the invading Arabs gained strong control in the Middle East and Africa, further conquests in Western Asia were halted. The focus of the Byzantine Empire shifted from the western reconquests of Justinian to a primarily defensive position, against the Islamic armies on its eastern borders. Without Byzantine interference in the emerging Christian states of western Europe, the situation gave a huge stimulus to feudalism and economic self-sufficiency.

The view of modern historians is that one of the most important effects was the strain it put on the relationship between Rome and Byzantium. While fighting for survival against the Islamic armies, the Empire was no longer able to provide the protection it had once offered to the Papacy; worse still, according to Thomas Woods, the Emperors "routinely intervened in the life of the Church in areas lying clearly beyond the state's competence". The Iconoclast controversy of the 8th and 9th centuries can be taken as a key factor "which drove the Latin Church into the arms of the Franks." Thus it has been argued that Charlemagne was an indirect product of Muhammad:

"The Frankish Empire would probably never have existed without Islam, and Charlemagne without Mahomet would be inconceivable."

The Holy Roman Empire of Charlemagne's successors would later come to the aid of the Byzantines under Louis II and during the Crusades, but relations between the two empires would be strained; based on the Salerno Chronicle, we know the Emperor Basil had sent an angry letter to his western counterpart, reprimanding him for usurping the title of emperor.

== Historiography and other sources ==
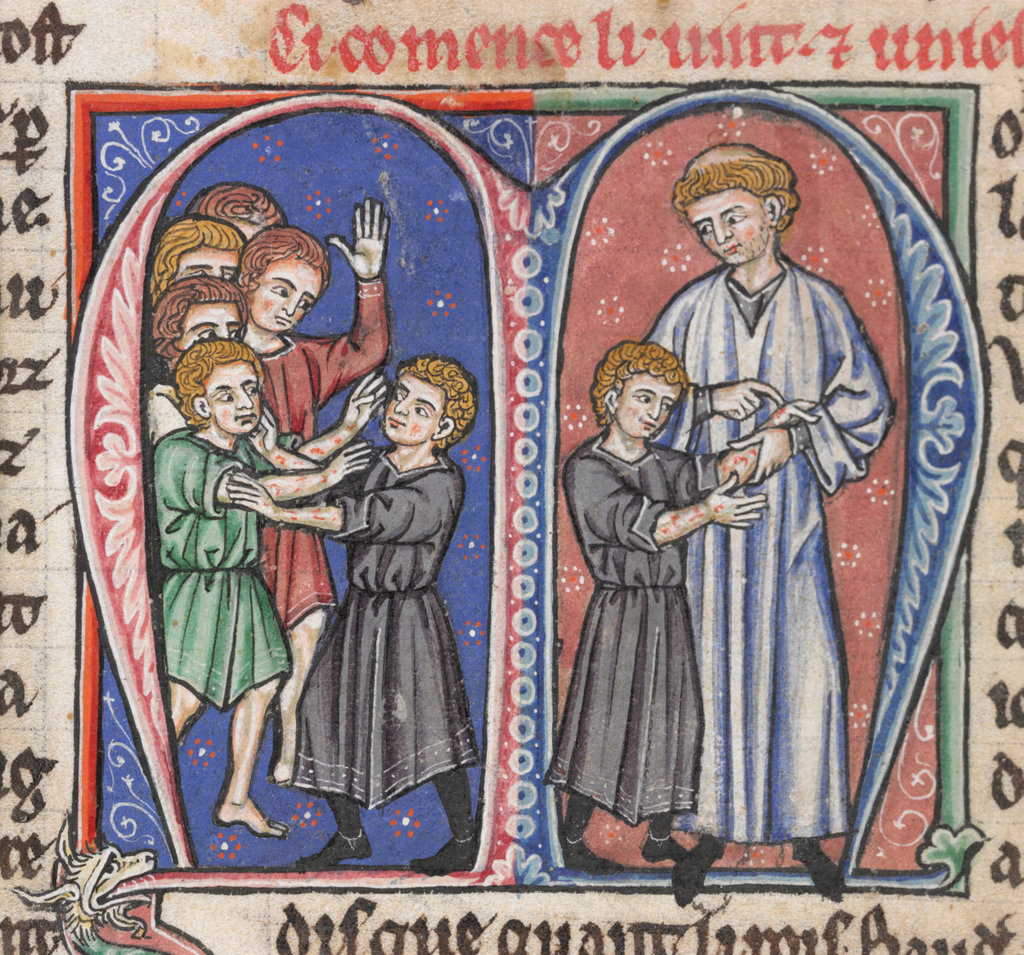
The 12th-century William of Tyre (right), an important commentator on the Crusades and the final stage of the Byzantine-Arab Wars

Walter Emil Kaegi states that extant Arabic sources have been given much scholarly attention for issues of obscurities and contradictions. However, he points out that Byzantine sources are also problematic, such as the chronicles of Theophanes and Nicephorus and those written in Syriac, which are short and terse while the important question of their sources and their use of sources remains unresolved. Kaegi concludes that scholars must also subject the Byzantine tradition to critical scrutiny, as it "contains bias and cannot serve as an objective standard against which all Muslim sources may be confidently checked".

Among the few Latin sources of interest are the 7th-century history of Fredegarius, and two 8th-century Spanish chronicles, all of which draw on some Byzantine and oriental historical traditions. As far as Byzantine military action against the initial Muslim invasions, Kaegi asserts that "Byzantine traditions ... attempt to deflect criticism of the Byzantine debacle from Heraclius to other persons, groups, and things".

The range of non-historical Byzantine sources is vast: they range from papyri to sermons (most notable those of Sophronius and Anastasius Sinaita), poetry (especially that of Sophronius and George of Pisidia) including the Acritic songs, correspondence often of a patristic provenance, apologetical treatises, apocalypses, hagiography, military manuals (in particular the Strategikon of Maurice from the beginning of the 7th century), and other non-literary sources, such as epigraphy, archeology, and numismatics. None of these sources contains a coherent account of any of the campaigns and conquests of the Muslim armies, but some do contain invaluable details that survive nowhere else.

== See also ==
- Roman Egypt
- Battle of Tours
- Byzantine–Ottoman wars
- Byzantine–Seljuk wars
- Early Muslim conquests
- Spread of Islam
