= Mu'awiya ibn Hisham =

Umayyad prince and general (died 737)

Mu'awiya ibn Hisham معاوية بن هشام
- Died: 737
- Spouse: Raha (concubine)
- Issue: Abd al-Rahman; Aban; Abd Allah; Al-Walid; Umayya; Yahya (up to thirteen sons)
- House: Marwanid
- Dynasty: Umayyad
- Father: Hisham ibn Abd al-Malik
- Mother: Umm Hakim bint Yahya (or a concubine)
- Religion: Islam
- Military career
- Allegiance: Umayyad Caliphate
- Branch: Umayyad army
- Rank: General
- Conflicts: Arab–Byzantine wars; Umayyad invasions of Asia Minor; Siege of Nicaea; Battle of Akroinon

Mu'awiya ibn Hisham ibn Abd al-Malik (Arabic: معاوية بن هشام بن عبد الملك, romanized: Muʿāwiya ibn Hishām ibn ʿAbd al-Malik; (fl. 725–737) was an Arab general and prince, the son of the Umayyad Caliph Hisham ibn Abd al-Malik (r. 724–743), who distinguished himself in the Arab–Byzantine Wars. His son, Abd al-Rahman, was the founder of the Emirate of Córdoba and the Umayyad line of al-Andalus.

== Origins ==
Biographical details about Mu'awiya are sparse. His father was Caliph Hisham ibn Abd al-Malik. His mother was either Umm Hakim (a daughter of Yahya ibn al-Hakam, an Umayyad statesman and brother of Hisham's paternal grandfather, Caliph Marwan I) or an umm walad (slave concubine).

== Military career ==
Mu'awiya is known chiefly for his role in the Arab–Byzantine Wars, where he led many invasions against Byzantine Asia Minor. The first campaign he led was in summer 725, which was carried out in conjunction with a naval attack by Maymun ibn Mihran against Cyprus. According to Arab accounts, Mua'wiya's army reached as far as Dorylaion, capturing many prisoners and sacking several forts. Mu'awiya is also recorded to have launched an expedition in 726, possibly in winter, but nothing specific is known of it. In 727, he led another expedition, alongside Abdallah al-Battal. Battal captured and razed Gangra first, and then their combined forces took the fortress of Ateous, and advanced on Nicaea. Despite a 40-day siege, however, they failed to capture it. In 728 he led the southern expedition into Asia Minor, while his brother Sa'id ibn Hisham led the northern; neither appears to have been particularly successful.

Muslim sources attribute to him the capture of the fortress of Charsianon in September/October 730, but Byzantine sources state that this was done by Mu'awiya's uncle, Maslama ibn Abd al-Malik. In the next year, his forces were reportedly unable to penetrate the frontier, while a secondary expedition by al-Battal was heavily defeated. In 732, Mu'awiya's expedition penetrated as far as Akroinon. In 733, he led an expedition into Paphlagonia. He continued to lead expeditions over the next few years, but although they ranged deep into Asia Minor in search of plunder—one of his raiding parties reportedly reached Sardeis near the Aegean coast—no major town or fortress appears to have been captured. In summer 737, he again led the southern expedition, but died, according to Theophanes the Confessor, by falling from his horse during a hunt.

== Legacy ==
He had thirteen sons, the most prominent being Abd al-Rahman (731–788), whose mother was a Berber umm walad, who escaped the fall of the Umayyad dynasty during the Abbasid Revolution in 750 to al-Andalus, where he founded the Umayyad Emirate of Córdoba. Mu'awiya was thus the ancestor of the emirs, and later caliphs, of al-Andalus until the dynasty's end in the 11th century.

Among his other sons, Umayya, accompanied his uncle Sulayman to join the rebel Kharijite leader Shayban ibn Abd al-Aziz at Mosul, was captured during single combat by a horseman of Marwan II (r. 744–750). Despite pleading for mercy on account of kinship, Umayya was executed on Marwan's orders, having his hands and head severed in full view of his uncle and brothers. Following the Abbasid overthrow, Aban, led a revolt in 751, but was defeated and died in captivity. Aban's son Ubayd Allah later joined Abd al-Rahman I in al-Andalus, as did Mu'awiya's other son, Abd Allah, and grandson, al-Mughira ibn al-Walid. Another son of Mu'awiya, Yahya, died while escaping Abbasid Syria with Abd al-Rahman I.

== Sources ==
- Blankinship, Khalid Yahya (1994). The End of the Jihâd State: The Reign of Hishām ibn ʻAbd al-Malik and the Collapse of the Umayyads. Albany, New York: State University of New York Press. ISBN 978-0-7914-1827-7.
- Cobb, Paul M. (2001). White Banners: Contention in 'Abbasid Syria, 750–880. SUNY Press. ISBN 978-0791448809.
- Lilie, Ralph-Johannes; Ludwig, Claudia; Pratsch, Thomas; Zielke, Beate (2000). Prosopographie der mittelbyzantinischen Zeit: 1. Abteilung (641–867), Band 2: Georgios (# 2183) – Leon (# 4270) (in German). Berlin and Boston: De Gruyter. ISBN 978-3-11-016672-9.
- Pellat, Ch. (1993). "Muʾāwiya b. Hishām". In Bosworth, C. E.; van Donzel, E.; Heinrichs, W. P. & Pellat, Ch. (eds.). The Encyclopaedia of Islam, Second Edition. Volume VII: Mif–Naz. Leiden: E. J. Brill. p. 269. ISBN 978-90-04-09419-2.
- Scales, Peter C. (1994). The Fall of the Caliphate of Cordoba: Berbers and Arabs in Conflict. Leiden: E. J. Brill. ISBN 90-04-09868-2.
- Ṭāhā, ʻAbd al-Wāḥid (1998). The Muslim conquest and settlement of North Africa and Spain. Routledge. ISBN 978-0-415-00474-9.
- Williams, John Alden, ed. (1985). The History of al-Ṭabarī, Volume XXVII: The ʿAbbāsid Revolution, A.D. 743–750/A.H. 126–132. SUNY Series in Near Eastern Studies. Albany, New York: State University of New York Press. ISBN 978-0-87395-884-4.
