= Sulayman ibn Hisham =

8th-century Umayyad prince and general

Sulayman ibn Hisham سليمان بن هشام
Names
- Sulayman ibn Hisham ibn Abd al-Malik (Arabic: سليمان بن هشام بن عبدالملك)
- House: Marwanid
- Dynasty: Umayyad
- Father: Hisham
- Mother: Umm Hakim bint Yahya
- Religion: Islam
- Military career
- Relatives: Walid II (cousin); Yazid III (cousin); Maslama (brother); Mu'awiya (brother); Sa'id (brother)
- Allegiance: Umayyad Caliphate
- Rank: General
- Conflicts: Arab–Byzantine wars, Third Fitna

Sulaymān ibn Hishām ibn ʿAbd al-Malik (Arabic: سليمان بن هشام بن عبدالملك; fl. 732–747) was an Arab general, the son of the Umayyad Caliph Hisham ibn Abd al-Malik (r. 723–743). He is known for his participation in the expeditions against the Byzantine Empire as well as his prominent role in the civil wars that occurred during the last years of the Umayyad Caliphate. Defeated by Marwan II (r. 744–750), he fled to India, where he died.

== Early life ==
Sulayman was the son of the Umayyad caliph Hisham ibn Abd al-Malik and his wife Umm Hakim, a daughter of the Umayyad prince, Hisham's paternal granduncle Yahya ibn al-Hakam. Sulayman was acquainted with the Islamic traditionist Ibn Shihab al-Zuhri and composed fine Arabic poetry, according to the medieval Syrian historian Ibn Asakir (d. 1175).

== Campaigns against Byzantium ==
Sulayman is first attested as leading the northern summer expedition ("of the right") against Byzantine-held Anatolia in 732, and again in 735, 736 (this time into Armenia) and in 737, but on neither campaign does he seem to have accomplished anything of note. In 738 however, he sacked a Byzantine fortress called Sideroun ("Iron Fort") taking many prisoners, including its commander, Eustathios. In 740, he was placed in overall charge of the exceptionally large campaign prepared for that year, which according to the chronicle of Theophanes the Confessor totalled 90,000 men. Two task forces were sent first, one of 10,000 lightly armed men under al-Ghamr ibn Yazid which was to raid the western coast of Anatolia, and 20,000 under Abdallah al-Battal and al-Malik ibn Su'aib who followed after towards Akroinon. The main force of some 60,000 (the number is certainly much inflated), under Sulayman, raided Cappadocia with Tyana as their target. Sulayman failed to take the city, and returned home after plundering the countryside. The second task force however suffered a major defeat at the Battle of Akroinon, losing some two thirds of its men, as well as its commanders.

In 741, Sulayman again led the summer campaign, and was again unsuccessful: while his forces besieged a Byzantine fortress, a disease struck their camp. Exacerbated by lack of supplies, this disease caused much loss of life both among men and beasts, while the army also suffered many casualties from the Byzantines' attacks. So bad was the situation that the 10th-century Arab Christian historian Agapius reports that many of Sulayman's soldiers even defected to the Byzantines and converted to Christianity. These failures were compounded by a Byzantine counter-attack shortly after which targeted Malatya. The city was saved, although Hisham himself had to take the field with whatever forces he could assemble; nevertheless, this attack, the first after many years of Byzantine passivity, signalled the shifting balance of power in the region. In the same year, Sulayman received and carried out his father's orders to execute all Byzantine prisoners, after a false report reached the Caliph that the Byzantines had executed their own Muslim prisoners.

In 742, taking advantage of the Byzantine civil war between the usurper Artabasdos and Constantine V (r. 741–775), Sulayman led another raid which reached as far as Paphlagonia undisturbed and took many prisoners.

== Civil wars ==
In 743, Hisham died, and Sulayman's cousin al-Walid II took power. Walid, jealous of Sulayman's popularity, had him flogged and imprisoned, an act which aroused considerable opposition and cost Walid much of the initial good will that he had enjoyed at his accession. In spring 744, a coup in Damascus deposed Walid, who was absent from the capital. He was killed soon after and replaced with Yazid III. The Arabs of Homs were still loyal to Walid and marched on Damascus with the intention of installing Abu Muhammad al-Sufyani, a descendant of the Sufyanid branch of the Umayyad clan, as caliph, but Sulayman was released from prison and defeated them. However, the turmoil did not subside: when Yazid died in September 744, the powerful and ambitious governor of northern Mesopotamia (the Jazira), Marwan ibn Muhammad, supported by the Qaysis of the Jazira and northern Syria, revolted against his successor Ibrahim ibn al-Walid. Initially, Marwan did not claim the caliphate for himself, but proclaimed his intent to restore the throne to Walid II's two imprisoned sons. Sulayman met Marwan's advance south of Baalbek with his personal army, the Dhakwaniyya. This force was 5,000 or more strong, was maintained from his own funds and estates, and recruited mostly from the mawali (non-Arab Muslims). Marwan defeated Sulayman who retreated to Damascus and ordered the execution of Walid II's sons. Then he, together with Ibrahim, fled to Palmyra. Soon however they came before Marwan and surrendered themselves.

Marwan's accession to the Caliphate remained contested both in Syria and in southern Mesopotamia (Iraq). After crushing a Syrian revolt in 745, Marwan formed an army of Syrian troops to send into Iraq, but they rebelled on their way and accepted Sulayman as their leader. The rebel army took Qinnasrin, but were soon after defeated by Marwan. Although much of his army survived and withdrew to Homs under the command of his brother Sa'id (where they were soon besieged by Marwan's forces), Sulayman fled from Homs to Palmyra and then to Kufa. There he entered the service of al-Dahhak ibn Qays al-Shaybani, the leader of the Mesopotamian Kharijites who, taking advantage of Marwan's preoccupation with the prolonged siege of Homs, had claimed the caliphate. After taking Homs in early 746 however, Marwan marched against Dahhak and defeated and killed him in battle at Kafartuta. The rebels then withdrew across the Tigris upon Sulayman's advice, escaping destruction for the time being. In 747 however, Marwan and his lieutenant Yazid ibn Hubayra were able to defeat the Kharijite remnants and consolidate their control of Iraq, while the surviving prominent rebels fled east; Sulayman himself fled to India along with Mansur ibn Jumhur, where he later died.

== Sources ==
- Blankinship, Khalid Yahya (1994). The End of the Jihâd State: The Reign of Hishām ibn ʻAbd al-Malik and the Collapse of the Umayyads. Albany, New York: State University of New York Press. ISBN 978-0-7914-1827-7.
- Hawting, Gerald R. (2000). The First Dynasty of Islam: The Umayyad Caliphate AD 661–750 (Second ed.). London and New York: Routledge. ISBN 0-415-24072-7.
- Hillenbrand, Carole, ed. (1989). The History of al-Ṭabarī, Volume XXVI: The Waning of the Umayyad Caliphate: Prelude to Revolution, A.D. 738–744/A.H. 121–126. SUNY Series in Near Eastern Studies. Albany, New York: State University of New York Press. ISBN 978-0-88706-810-2.
- Intagliata, Emanuele E. (2018) [1950]. Palmyra after Zenobia AD 273-750: An Archaeological and Historical Reappraisal. Oxford: Oxbow Books. ISBN 978-1-78570-942-5.
- Lilie, Ralph-Johannes; Ludwig, Claudia; Pratsch, Thomas; Zielke, Beate (2001). "Sulaimān ibn Hišām (# 7162)". Prosopographie der mittelbyzantinischen Zeit: 1. Abteilung (641–867), Band 4: Platon (# 6266) – Theophylaktos (# 8345) (in German). Berlin and Boston: De Gruyter. p. 284. ISBN 978-3-11-016674-3.
