= Maslama ibn Hisham =

Umayyad prince and Commander

Maslama ibn Hishām مسلمة بن هشام
- Died: c. 750
- Wife: Umm Salama bint Ya'qub al-Makhzumi
- Children: Sa'id ibn Maslama
- House: Marwanid
- Dynasty: Umayyad
- Father: Hisham ibn Abd al-Malik
- Mother: Umm Hakim bint Yahya
- Religion: Islam
- Military career
- Allegiance: Umayyad Caliphate
- Branch: Umayyad army
- Rank: General
- Conflicts: Arab–Byzantine wars; Umayyad invasions of Asia Minor

Maslama ibn Hisham ibn Abd al-Malik (Arabic: مسلمة بن هشام بن عبد الملك, romanized: Maslama ibn Hishām ibn ʿAbd al-Malik; died c. 750), also known by his kunya Abu Shakir, was an Umayyad prince and commander.

His capture of the southern caverns of Cappadocia and the fortress of Ancyra in 739 marked the last Umayyad military gains in the wars with Byzantium. Despite the abortive attempts by his father Caliph Hisham ibn Abd al-Malik (r. 724–743) to install Maslama as his chosen successor in place of al-Walid ibn Yazid, Maslama became a close companion of al-Walid and defended him from his father's machinations. As a result, he was spared the fate of his brothers who were imprisoned upon al-Walid's accession in 743. Nothing is heard of Maslama afterward and he may have been killed in a massacre of the Umayyad family by the Abbasids following their takeover of the Caliphate in 750.

== Early life and plans for caliphal succession ==
Maslama was the son of the Umayyad caliph Hisham ibn Abd al-Malik (r. 724–743) and the latter's wife Umm Hakim, the daughter of Yahya ibn al-Hakam, a brother of Hisham's paternal grandfather Caliph Marwan I (r. 684–685). Umm Hakim, like her mother Zaynab bint Abd al-Rahman, was well known for her beauty, and her fondness for wine was the subject of contemporary poetic verses preserved in the Kitab al-aghani (Book of Songs) of Abu al-Faraj al-Isfahani (d. 967). Maslama was married to Umm Salama bint Ya'qub ibn Salama, a member of the aristocratic Banu Makhzum clan and a fourth-generation descendant of al-Walid ibn al-Walid (brother of Khalid ibn al-Walid). She later married the first Abbasid caliph as-Saffah (r. 750–754).

Following his accession, Hisham attempted to secure Maslama as his successor in place of the appointed successor, his predecessor's son al-Walid ibn Yazid II (known as al-Walid II). Hisham's initial attempts following the Hajj of 735 to persuade al-Walid to step down in favor of Maslama or give Maslama the oath of allegiance as al-Walid's successor were rejected by al-Walid. Afterward, Hisham sought to undermine al-Walid and secretly gathered support for Maslama. The latter's nomination was supported by his paternal uncle, the famous general Maslama ibn Abd al-Malik, Hisham's maternal grandfather, Hisham ibn Isma'il al-Makhzumi, a former governor of Medina, and his sons Ibrahim and Muhammad, and the sons of the influential Banu Abs chief of northern Syria, al-Qa'qa' ibn Khulayd. Maslama's mother Umm Hakim also lobbied for her son's succession. Opposed to Maslama's proposed succession was Khalid al-Qasri, the governor of Iraq, to which Maslama responded by insulting him and his dead brother Asad. Maslama ibn Abd al-Malik's death in the late 730s was a major setback to Hisham's succession plans as it represented the loss of the plan's key supporter in the Umayyad family.

== Career under Hisham ==
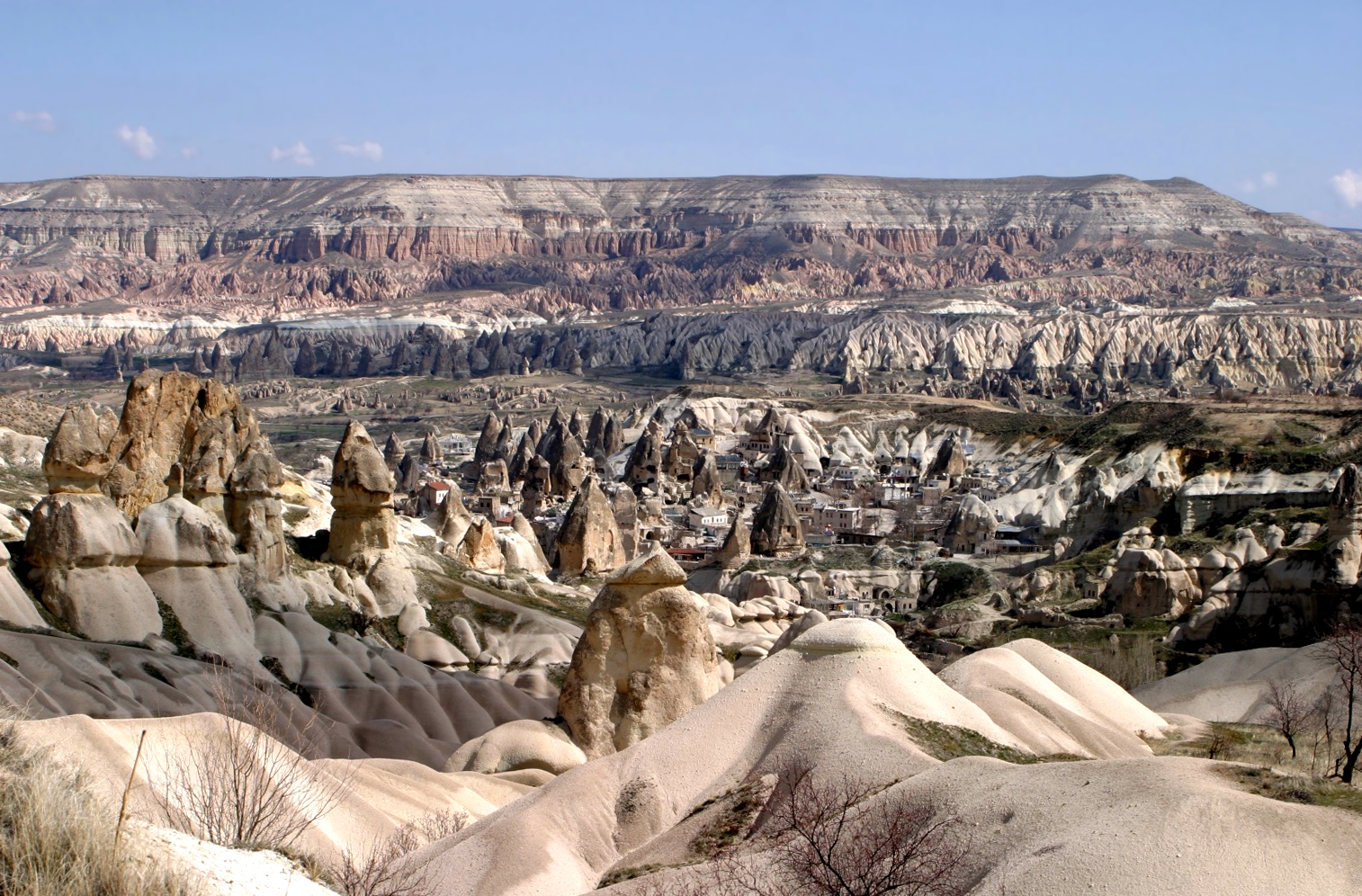
Maslama seized the southern, cavernous part of Cappadocia (area pictured in 2006) in an expedition against the Byzantines in c. 739

Despite the animosity toward al-Walid by Hisham and the latter's stern and austere lifestyle, Maslama had become al-Walid's drinking companion, which al-Walid used to mock Hisham when the caliph reprimanded him for consuming wine. His insult to Hisham became a celebrated poetic verse:

Oh you who ask about our religion / we follow the religion of Abu Shakir (Maslama)
We drink the wine both straight and mixed / sometimes warm and sometimes chilled

In response, Hisham castigated Maslama, ordering him to attend the congregational Friday prayers. According to the historian al-Mada'ini (d. 843), Maslama thereafter became devoted to religion and "behaved in a steady and gentle manner". Along with a number of his brothers, Maslama came under the tutelage of one of the major Muslim scholars of his time, Ibn Shihab al-Zuhri. Hisham appointed Maslama to lead the Hajj pilgrimage to Mecca in November 737, accompanied by al-Zuhri, who advised him in the operation. During the Hajj expedition, he distributed money to the people of Medina and Mecca.

Maslama commanded the summer expedition against the Byzantine Empire in 739, taking control of al-Matamir, the cavernous southern half of Cappadocia, and besieged and captured Ancyra (modern Ankara). Maslama's victories marked the last Umayyad captures of a Byzantine fortress or town. The following summer the Umayyads launched the largest expedition against the Byzantines during Hisham's reign. The main expedition was led by Maslama's brother Sulayman, and Maslama may have commanded a separate expedition during the same year. The Umayyads raided throughout western Anatolia but were beaten back by the Byzantines without any territorial gains, while two of the Caliphate's leading generals, Abdallah al-Battal and Malik ibn Shu'ayb were slain by the forces of Byzantine emperor Leo III.

== Later life and death ==
Hisham died in February 743 and Maslama led the funeral prayers. Al-Walid acceded to the caliphate and immediately ordered that Hisham's sons at Rusafa, near Palmyra, be arrested by their cousin al-Abbas ibn al-Walid, but expressly forbade that Maslama or his household be disturbed in deference to their old companionship and Maslama's defense of al-Walid from Caliph Hisham. Al-Walid's endearment and generosity toward Maslama is noted in the poems preserved by al-Isfahani. Although he avoided arrest by al-Walid, nothing is heard of him in the sources thereafter and the historian Clifford Edmund Bosworth presumes he may have been executed by the Abbasids during the massacre of the Umayyad family at the river of Antipatris (Nahr Abi Futrus) in 750, following the Umayyad dynasty's collapse in the Abbasid Revolution.

== Family ==
Maslama had been infertile until he was reportedly healed by the father of Khalid ibn Barmak, the progenitor of the Barmakid family who came under the patronage of Caliph Hisham. Maslama and Khalid had grown up in the same palace in Hisham's court. After his treatment, Maslama and his wife Umm Salama had their son Sa'id, who was nicknamed "al-Barmaki". Sa'id may have been spared persecution following the Abbasid Revolution because the Abbasid caliph al-Saffah was his stepfather. Sa'id became an oral transmitter of historical tradition in the early Abbasid period.

== Bibliography ==
- Blankinship, Khalid Yahya, ed. (1989). The History of al-Ṭabarī, Volume XXV: The End of Expansion: The Caliphate of Hishām, A.D. 724–738/A.H. 105–120. SUNY Series in Near Eastern Studies. Albany, New York: State University of New York Press. ISBN 978-0-88706-569-9.
- Blankinship, Khalid Yahya (1994). The End of the Jihâd State: The Reign of Hishām ibn ʻAbd al-Malik and the Collapse of the Umayyads. Albany, New York: State University of New York Press. ISBN 978-0-7914-1827-7.
- Bosworth, C. Edmund (1994). "Abū Ḥafṣ 'Umar al-Kirmānī and the Rise of the Barmakids". Bulletin of the School of Oriental and African Studies. 57 (2): 268–282. doi:10.1017/S0041977X0002485X. JSTOR 620573.
- Elad, Amikam (2016). The Rebellion of Muḥammad al-Nafs al-Zakiyya in 145/762: Ṭālibīs and Early ʿAbbāsīs in Conflict. Leiden: Brill. ISBN 978-90-04-22989-1.
- Hillenbrand, Carole, ed. (1989). The History of al-Ṭabarī, Volume XXVI: The Waning of the Umayyad Caliphate: Prelude to Revolution, A.D. 738–744/A.H. 121–126. SUNY Series in Near Eastern Studies. Albany, New York: State University of New York Press. ISBN 978-0-88706-810-2.
- Judd, Steven (July–September 2008). "Reinterpreting al-Walīd b. Yazīd". Journal of the American Oriental Society. 128 (3): 439–458. JSTOR 25608405.
- Judd, Steven (2014). Religious Scholars and the Umayyads: Piety-Minded Supporters of the Marwanid Caliphate. Abingdon, Oxon: Routledge. ISBN 978-0-415-84497-0.
- Marsham, Andrew (2009). The Rituals of Islamic Monarchy: Accession and Succession in the First Muslim Empire. Edinburgh: Edinburgh University Press. ISBN 978-0-7486-2512-3.
