= Conquest of Mérida (712–713) =

- Part of Umayyad conquest of Hispania
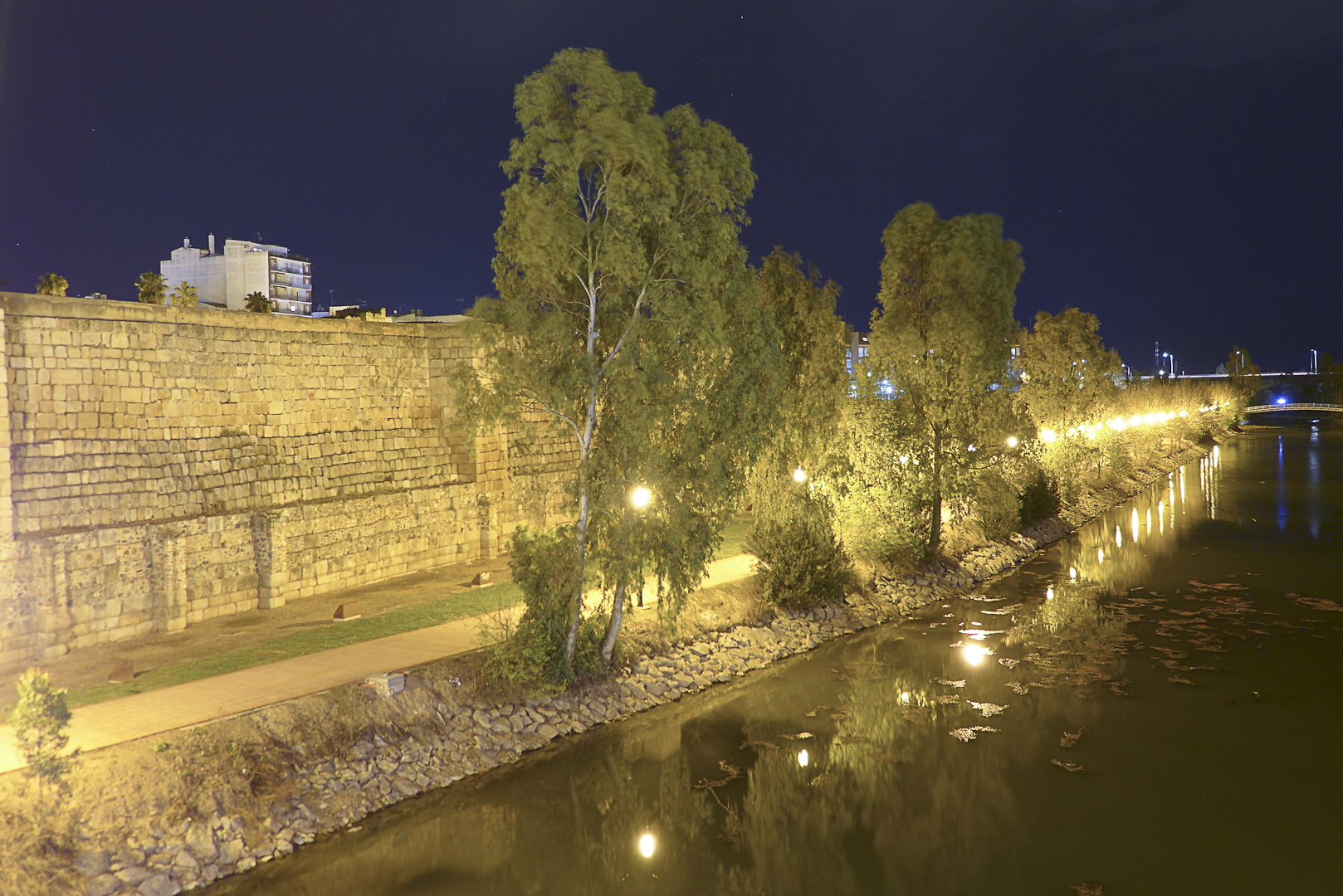
- Walls of Mérida which resisted the Muslims for several months
Date	November 712 – 30 June 713
Location	Mérida, Spain
Result	Umayyad victory: Muslim Hegemony in southern Spain

Belligerents
Visigothic Kingdom	Umayyad Caliphate

Commanders and leaders
Duke Sacarus	Musa ibn Nusayr

Strength
Unknown	Unknown

Casualties and losses
Heavy	Heavy

The Conquest of Merida was a military engagement between the Umayyads and the Visigothic garrison. The Umayyads endured a hard siege that lasted several months before the Umayyads succeeded in capturing the city, achieving a notable victory.

== Background ==
Musa ibn Nusayr arrived on the Iberian peninsula after hearing victories achieved by the Umayyad general, Tariq ibn Ziyad. He decided to participate in the conquest. Musa arrived with a large force of Muslims. Guided by Julian, Count of Ceuta, Musa managed to capture Medina-Sidonia, Carmona, and Seville. Musa then arrived in Mérida. The Visigoth power has been weakened but not destroyed. They still had sufficient forces concentrated at Mérida to resist the Muslims. The garrison at Mérida was led by Duke Sacarus, a brave and wise leader who commanded a strong garrison. Merida had the shape of a triangle and was protected by powerful walls and a citadel from the Roman times.

== Conquest ==
Musa arrived to the city in November 712, where he found the Visigoth outside the walls to meet the Muslim in battle. The Visigoths attacked and routed them, inflicting heavy losses on them. Musa was watching the battle from far; he discovered a quarry, and there planned an ambush. He placed infantry and cavalry under the cover of darkness. The next day, the Muslims attacked the Visigoth and once again were pushed back; however, those who were hidden in the quarry attacked the Visigoth. A fierce battle ensued in which the Visigoth were routed and forced to retreat to the city.

Musa then laid siege to the city. It has lasted several months, and the garrison fought with desperate bravery. The Muslims attempted to assault the walls but were repelled each time. Musa then began building a siege engine called Dabbaba or Battering ram. Being protected underneath, the Muslims approached one of the towers and broke through the stonework. They removed the ashlar and, in the gap, found a solid mortar that resisted the battering ram. The Visigoths were alerted and attacked the Muslims inside and killed them. Thus earning this tower's name as Martyr's tower.

A Visigoth delegation came to Muslim on June 28, 713, to ask for peace; Musa agreed. The Visigoth also agreed to give wealth to him of those who were killed in the day of the ambush or those who fled from the city. Thus the city had fallen to the Muslims on June 30. The population was allowed to live as before.

== Aftermath ==
With the fall of Mérida to the Muslims, their hegemony in southern Spain was completed and the Visigothic power collapsed. Musa then marched to Toledo where he would rendezvous with Tariq.

== Sources ==
- David James (2012), A History of Early Al-Andalus, The Akhbar Majmu'a.
- Abdulwahid Dhanun Taha (2016), Routledge Library Editions: Muslim Spain.
- Agha Ibrahim Akram (2004), The Muslim Conquest of Spain.
- Sir William Muir (1915), The Caliphate, Its Rise, Decline, and Fall, From Original Sources.
- Robert Hodum (2012), Pilgrims' Steps, A Search for Spain's Santiago and an Examination of His Way.
