= Conquest of Carmona (712) =

- Part of Umayyad conquest of Hispania
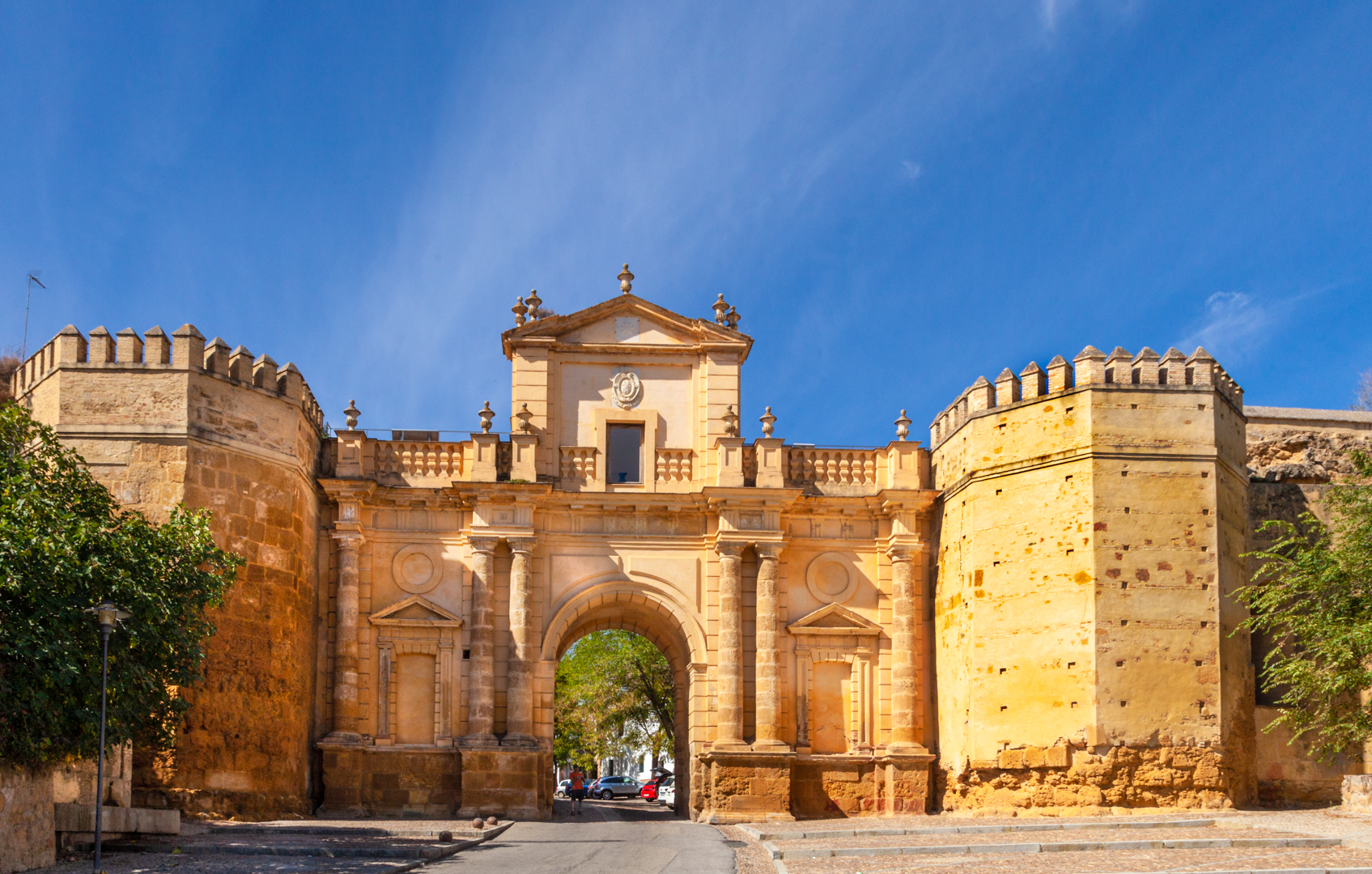
- The gate of Crodoba in Carmona, where the Muslim entered and captured the city
Date	July 712
Location	Carmona, Spain
Result	Umayyad victory: Fall of Carmona to Muslims

Belligerents
Visigothic Kingdom	Umayyad Caliphate

Commanders and leaders
Unknown	Musa ibn Nusayr; Count Julian

Strength
Unknown	Unknown

Casualties and losses
Heavy	Unknown

The conquest of Carmona was a successful capture of the city of Carmona by the Ummayads led by Musa bin Nusayr, which happened in 712.

== History ==
According to Arab accounts, in July 712, the Ummayad general, Musa ibn Nusayr, crossed the strait of Giblartar with a force of 18,000 Arabs. Learning of what Tariq ibn Ziyad had done, he became envious and decided to take part in the success. Landing at Algeciras, the Visigothic guides led by Julian led Musa to conquer important towns that had not been captured. The Ummayads arrived at Medina-Sidonia, which had surrendered to them.

The Visigothic guides led Musa to the city of Carmona. The city of Carmona was the most well fortified town in Spain and was less likely to be taken by assault or siege. When the Ummayads arrived there, the guides told Musa that the city could only be taken by stealth. Musa then made a plan; he dispatched some of Julian's armed men to the city, pretending to be soldiers who fled from their enemies after a battle. Julian's men arrived at the gate called Cordoba's gate, explaining what happened, and the garrison opened the gates for them. In the night, Musa dispatched some cavalry to the city. The guides opened the gates for the Muslims, which allowed them to enter and kill the guards. Thus Carmona fell into Muslim hands.

With the fall of Carmona to the Muslims, the entire region east of Seville was clear from any Visigothic resistance, which allowed Musa to advance to Seville.

== Sources ==
- David James (2012), A History of Early Al-Andalus, The Akhbar Majmu'a.
- Reinhart Pieter Anne Dozy (1913), Spanish Islam, A History of the Moslems in Spain.
- Agha Ibrahim Akram (2004), The Muslim Conquest of Spain.
