= Siege of Córdoba =

The siege of Córdoba may refer to the following battles:

- Siege of Corduba
- Siege of Córdoba (711)
- Siege of Córdoba (1009–1013)
- Siege of Córdoba (1146)
- Siege of Córdoba (1150)
- Siege of Córdoba (1236)

== See also ==
- Sack of Córdoba
