= Chronica Gothorum Pseudoisidoriana =

Medieval chronicle of the history of Spain

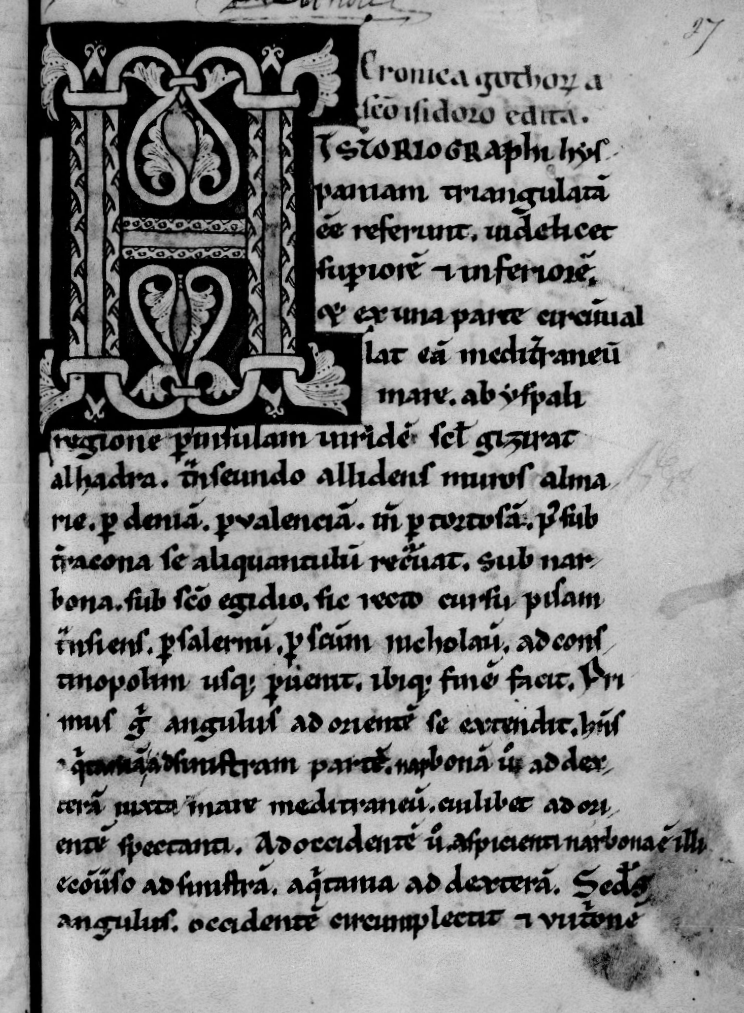
First page of the Chronica in the manuscript BNF lat. 6113. The title Cronica Gothorum a Sancto Isidoro edita appears beside the decorative initial H, which begins the first sentence: Historiographi Hyspaniam triangulatam esse referunt (Historiographers report that Spain is triangular).

The Chronica Gothorum Pseudoisidoriana, (Note: Translation: "Gothic chronicle falsely ascribed to Isidore".) also known as the Historia Pseudoisidoriana (Note: Translation: "History falsely ascribed to Isidore".) or the Chronicle of Pseudo-Isidore, is an anonymous 12th-century Latin chronicle from southern France. It presents the history of Spain from the time of the sons of Noah and their dispersal down to the Arab conquest in 711.

The Chronica survives in a single manuscript, now BNF lat. 6113 in the Bibliothèque nationale de France. In the 16th century, the manuscript was acquired by Pierre Pithou, who brought it to Paris. The Chronica is found on folios 27–48 under the title Cronica Gothorum a Sancto Isidoro edita. (Note: Translation: "Chronicle of the Goths published by Saint Isidore".) Theodor Mommsen prepared the first critical edition of the Chronica in 1894 and gave it the name (pseudoisidoriana) by which it is now most widely known.

While the Chronica relies heavily on the works of Isidore of Seville, it was not compiled by him. It is in fact a translation of an Arabic translation of a collection of Latin works. Its identified sources are the Chronicon of Jerome, the Seven Books of History Against the Pagans of Orosius, the Historia Gothorum of Isidore, the Cosmographia of Julius Honorius, the Chronicon of John of Biclar and the anonymous Mozarabic Chronicle. All of these have been garbled and interpolated in the stages of transmission before reaching their final Latin form. Toponyms and personal names, in particular, are frequently based on their Arabic forms. The Arabic translation of Orosius was also used by Aḥmad al-Rāzī (died 955) in his history of Spain, which likewise survives only in translation.

The Chronica is of little use to the historian for the period it covers, although it sheds light on the time and place of its composition. Internal evidence suggests that it was written in the 12th century, since it mentions Morocco, a name which did not appear before 1090, being derived from the city of Marrakesh, founded in 1055. The compiler also included a description of the ports of the western Mediterranean in which he mentions Saint Nicholas of Bari. The relics of the saint did not arrive in Bari until 1087. The Arabic original of the Chronica was almost certainly compiled in Spain, where the translation was likely also made by a writer working in the Visigothic script. It was later copied in France, most likely at the monastery of Aniane.

The Chronica has a unique perspective among Latin sources on the Arab conquest. It emphasis how Ṭāriḳ ibn Ziyād brought peace to the peninsula after the civil wars that plagued the last years of the Visigothic Kingdom. It is also the earliest source to provide a name to the daughter of Count Julian who, according to legend, was raped by King Roderic. It names her Oliba, although this was subsequently forgotten as later accounts call her La Cava.

== Editions ==
- Theodor Mommsen, ed. "Historia Pseudoisidoriana", MGH Auctores antiquissimi 11 (Berlin, 1894), Additamentum VIII, pp. 377–388.
- Fernando González Muñoz, ed. La chronica gothorum pseudo-isidoriana (ms. Paris BN 6113): Edición crítica, traducción y estudios. A Coruña: Editorial Toxosoutos, 2000.
