= Battle of Guadalete =

8th-century battle between the Visigothic Kingdom and the Umayyad Caliphate

Coordinates: 36.6000°N 6.2167°W

- Part of Muslim conquest of the Iberian Peninsula
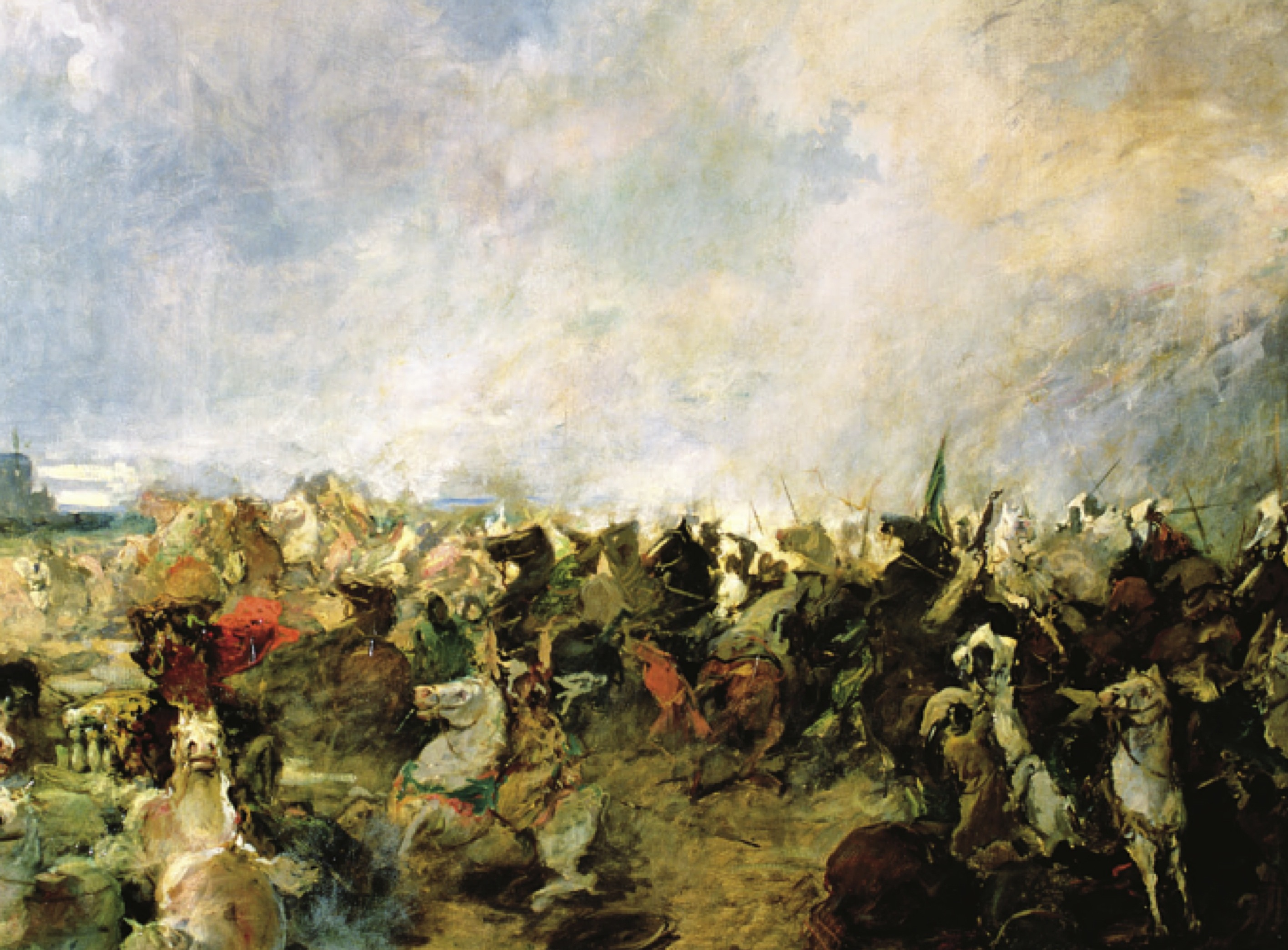
- The Visigothic retreat in front of the Berber cavalry, as depicted by Salvador Martínez Cubells (1845–1914)
Date	July 711
Location	Near a body of water in southern Iberia
Result	Umayyad victory

Belligerents
Visigothic Kingdom	Umayyad Caliphate

Commanders and leaders
Roderic †	Ṭāriq ibn Ziyad

Strength
~2,500 (Collins); 33,000 (Lewis)	~1,900 (Collins); 12,000 (Lewis)

Casualties and losses
Heavy, including many nobles and the king killed	~3,000

The Battle of Guadalete was the first major battle of the Muslim conquest of the Iberian Peninsula, fought in July 711 at an unidentified location in what is now southern Spain between the Visigoths under their king, Roderic, and the invading forces of the Umayyad Caliphate, composed of mainly Berbers and some Arabs under the commander Tariq ibn Ziyad. The battle was significant as the culmination of a series of Umayyad attacks and the beginning of al-Andalus. Roderic was killed in the battle, along with many members of the Visigothic nobility, opening the way for the capture of the Visigothic capital of Toledo.

== Sources ==
The primary source for the battle is the Mozarabic Chronicle, which was written shortly after 754, probably in the vicinity of Toledo. The Latin Chronicle was written by a Mozarab Christian. The only other Latin Christian source written within a century of the battle is the Historia Langobardorum of Paul the Deacon. Paul was neither Visigothic nor Hispanic, but was writing probably in Montecassino between 787 and 796, where many Visigothic monks had taken refuge. The Chronicle of 741 is a near-contemporary Hispanic source, but it contains no original material pertaining to the battle. Several later Latin Christian sources contain descriptive accounts of the battle that have sometimes been trusted by historians, most notably the Chronicle of Alfonso III, written by Alfonso III of Asturias in the late ninth century. The high medieval accounts, such as that of Lucas de Tuy, are generally untrustworthy, containing much legend and invention.

Besides the Latin Christian sources are several Arabic-language sources, widely used by historians but increasingly coming under heavy criticism. None of them predates the mid-ninth century. The earliest, the Futūh Miṣr of Ibn ʿAbd al-Ḥakam (c.803–871), was composed in Egypt. This account, more rich in detail than the Mozarabic Chronicle, is at odds with not only the later Latin histories, but also the later Arabic ones: the anonymous compilation called the Akhbar Majmu'ah, the late tenth-century work of Ibn al-Qūṭiyya ("the son [i.e. descendant] of the Goth [i.e. Wittiza]"), the eleventh-century historian Ibn Hayyān, the thirteenth-century Complete History of Ibn al-Athir, the fourteenth-century history of Ibn Khaldūn, or the early modern work of al-Maqqarī. The Akhbar Majmu'ah in particular was upheld by Claudio Sánchez-Albornoz as a genuine eighth-century work surviving only in later copies, but this view has since been refuted. The French Orientalist Évariste Lévi-Provençal, on the other hand, advocated Ibn Hayyān as the supreme Muslim historian of the era (and of the battle).

Among modern Anglo-American historians, Roger Collins, R. A. Fletcher, E. A. Thompson, and Kenneth Baxter Wolf are sceptical of the Arabic sources and rely more on the Mozarabic Chronicle. Historians Thomas F. Glick and Bernard S. Bachrach are less sceptical. Collins in particular rejects a syncretistic approach incorporating information from all the available sources.

== Background ==
Though the reign of Roderic is traditionally dated to 710–711, a literal reading of the Mozarabic Chronicle of 754 indicates 711–712. Roderic did not rule unopposed, however. The nature of his accession on the death of Wittiza from natural causes or through his assassination is not clear from the sources. It is possible that Roderic was probably the dux (duke) of Baetica before coming to the throne. Archaeological evidence and two surviving lists of kings show that one Achila II ruled in the northeast of the kingdom at this time, but his relationship to Roderic is unknown. Probably they were rivals who never actually came into open conflict, due to the shortness of Roderic's reign and his preoccupation with Muslim raids. Even with Roderic's sphere of influence (the southwest) and his capital Toledo, he was not unopposed after his "usurpation" (the Mozarabic Chronicle calls it an "invasion").

The battle of Guadalete was not an isolated Berber attack but followed a series of raids across the Straits of Gibraltar from North Africa which had resulted in the sack of several south Iberian towns. Berber forces had probably been harassing the peninsula by sea since the conquest of Tangiers in 705–706. Some later Arabic and Christian sources present an earlier raid by a certain Ṭārif in 710 and one, the Ad Sebastianum recension of the Chronicle of Alfonso III, refers to an Arab attack incited by Erwig during the reign of Wamba (672–680). Two reasonably large armies may have been in the south for a year before the decisive battle was fought. These were led by Ṭāriq ibn Ziyad and others under the overall command of Mūsā ibn Nuṣayr.

According to all sources, the earliest being Paul the Deacon, Ṭāriq left from Ceuta (Septem) and landed at the Rock of Calpe, the later Gibraltar, which Arabic sources derive from Jebel Tariq, "Rock of Ṭāriq". A legend first recorded by al-Idrīsī has it that Ṭāriq burned his boats after landing to prevent his army from deserting. From Gibraltar he moved to conquer the region of Algeciras and then followed the Roman road that led to Seville. According to Ibn ʿAbd al-Ḥakam, writing around 860, Ṭāriq, commander of the Berber garrison of Tangiers, crossed the straits with ships supplied by a certain Count Julian (Arabic Ilyan), lord of Ceuta and "Alchadra" (Algeciras), and landed near Cartagena, which he captured and made his headquarters.

According to the Mozarabic Chronicle, Mūsā crossed the Gaditanum fretum (Strait of Cádiz) with a large force in 711 and remained in Hispania for fifteen months, but it is unclear from the sources if he came before or after the battle of Guadalete, which was fought by the forces of his subordinates. During his time in the peninsula it was racked by civil war (intestino furore confligeratur, "internal frenzy", to the Mozarabic chronicler), cities were razed, and many people were slaughtered in the general destruction.

According to al-Maqqarī, Roderic was fighting the Basques when he was recalled to the south to deal with an invasion. There is also the record of a Byzantine attack on southern Iberia that was repulsed by Theudimer some years before the fall of the Visigothic kingdom. This has led to theories that the Berber attacks may have been related to the Byzantine operation, and that perhaps the Arabs were originally useful allies in a Byzantine attempt to reconquer the lost province of Spania.

The author of the late Asturian Chronica Prophetica (883) dates the first invasion of Spain to "the Ides of November in the year 752 era", that is, 11 November 714. He also identified two invasions, the first by an Abu Zubra and the second, a year later, by Ṭāriq; probably he has divided the historical figure Ṭāriq ibn Ziyad into two persons.

== Date and place ==
The date of the battle is traditionally 711, though this is not the date given by the Mozarabic Chronicle. The Chronicle dates it to 712 and places it before the conquest of Toledo, which it attributes to Mūsā in 711. If this discrepancy is solved by preferring the chronicler's order to his dating, then the battle occurred in 712 and the fall of Toledo later that same year. Later Arabic accounts give an exact date of 25 or 26 July. A more rough dating is between 19 and 23 July. According to David Levering Lewis, the battle took place on 19 July 711. Preceding the battle was an entire week of inconclusive skirmishes near the lake La Janda, in the plain stretching from the Río Barbate to the Río Guadalete.

According to ʿAbd al-Ḥakam, Ṭāriq was marching from Cartagena to Córdoba—after defeating a Gothic army that tried to stop him—when he met Roderic in battle near Shedunya, probably modern Medina Sidonia. The later Arab accounts, most of them generating from al-Ḥakam's, also place the battle near Medina Sidonia, "near the lake" or Wadilakka (river Lakka), often identified as the Guadalete river, La Janda lake, stream of "Beca", or the Barbate river (that is, their associated valleys). The earliest Christian source, and the nearest source in time to the events, says that it took place near the unidentified "Transductine promontories" (Transductinis promonturiis). Thomas Hodgkin, probably following Rodrigo Jiménez de Rada, placed the battle at Jerez de la Frontera. Joaquín Vallvé, studying toponymy, puts the engagement on the banks of the Guadarranque, which he says might derive from Wad al-Rinq (Roderic's river).

It has recently been argued that the battle took place in a field bordering the Almodóvar River, in Province of Cádiz.

== Clash ==
The armies that met in battle on the day that decided the fate of the Gothic kingdom in Spain are not reliably described in the surviving records. Glick surmises that the Muslim army was predominantly Berber cavalry under Berber leadership. The Arabic sources traditionally give Roderic 100,000 troops, gathered during his return to the south after confronting the Basques. This number is outrageously high; it complements the figure of 187,000 for the Muslims provided by the Ad Sebastianum version of the Chronicle of Alfonso III. Ṭāriq is said to have landed with 7,000 horsemen and requested 5,000 more from Mūsā. There could thus have been as many as 12,000 Muslim fighters at the battle. One modern estimate, disregarding the primary source claims, suggest a quarter of the 7,500 reported in one of them; this would be approximately 2,000. The Visigothic forces were "probably not much larger", and the Visigothic kingdom was, unlike Francia to its north, not organised for war. A small number of elite clans (perhaps around twenty five), their warrior followings, the king and his personal following, and the forces that could be raised from the royal fisc constituted the troops upon which Roderic could draw.

The defeat of the Visigothic army followed on the flight of the king's opponents, who had only accompanied the host "in rivalry", "deceitfully", and "out of ambition to rule" says the Mozarabic chronicler. The story of Sisibert abandoning Roderic with the right wing of the host is a legend. Estimating Visigothic forces at 33,000, David Lewis recounts how the Muslim army engaged in a series of violent hit and run attacks, while the Visigothic lines maneuvered en masse. A cavalry wing that had secretly pledged to rebel against Roderic stood aside, giving the enemy an opening. Ṭāriq's cavalry, the mujaffafa, forming as much as a third of the total force and armored in coats of light mail and identifiable by a turban over a metal cap, exploited the opening and charged into the Visigothic infantry, soon followed by the infantry. The Christian army was routed and the king slain in the final hours of battle. The engagement was a bloodbath: Visigothic losses were extremely high, and the Muslims lost as many as 3,000 men, or a quarter of their force.

It is possible that his enemies intended to abandon Roderic on the field, to be defeated and killed by the Muslims. Whatever the case, their plan failed, for they too were largely slain. By another text from the Mozarabic Chronicle the treachery can be placed at Roderic's feet. He "lost his kingdom together with his patria with the killing of his rivals". This unclear passage could indicate that Roderic had killed his rivals and weakened his army, ensuring defeat, or that his rivals too died in the battle or its retreat. The chronicler may be blaming the defeat on factionalism. The Chronicle of Alfonso III, in both its versions, blames the anonymous "sons of Wittiza" for conspiring against Roderic. Oppa, Wittiza's historical brother, was found in Toledo, possibly as king-elect, by Mūsā when he took the city. This Oppa may have had a part to play in the opposition to Roderic, but certainly not his nephews, who would have been too young to participate in power politics in 711. The metropolitan of Toledo, Sindered, fled the city at the coming of the Muslims, and remained for the rest of his life an exile in Rome. The author of the Mozarabic Chronicle caustically notes that he was "an hireling, and not the shepherd" (quoting Jesus, Gospel of John 10:12). The Gothic nobleman Theudimer made an alliance with the conquerors to preserve his own rule of his territory. Within a decade all of the peninsula save the tiny Kingdom of Asturias and the mountain-dwelling Basques was under Muslims dominion and they had advanced beyond the Pyrenees as well.

== Cause of Muslim victory ==
The later Arabic historians universally credit their religion for the victory. Al-Maqqarī, in The Breath of Perfumes, places in the mouth of Ṭāriq a morale-boosting address to his soldiers on the eve of battle, which closes with this exhortation to kill Roderic:

Remember that I place myself in the front of this glorious charge which I exhort you to make. At the moment when the two armies meet hand to hand, you will see me, never doubt it, seeking out this Roderick, tyrant of his people, challenging him to combat, if God is willing. If I perish after this, I will have had at least the satisfaction of delivering you, and you will easily find among you an experienced hero, to whom you can confidently give the task of directing you. But should I fall before I reach to Roderick, redouble your ardor, force yourselves to the attack and achieve the conquest of this country, in depriving him of life. With him dead, his soldiers will no longer defy you.

According to later traditions, Iberian Jews, progressively disenfranchised under the rule of Christian monarchs and bishops, provided fighters to augment the Moorish forces. Kaula al-Yahudi distinguished himself in the battle at the head of a mixed contingent of Jews and Berbers, according to the compiler of the Akhbar Majmu'ah. In the aftermath of victory, the Jews reputedly took several cities and were even commissioned to garrison Seville, Córdoba, and Toledo itself. Thompson remarks that "whatever the reason for the [Goths'] persecution [of the Jews], it may have contributed to the utter destruction of those who initiated and enforced it." Despite all this, the participation of Jews on the side of the Muslims is not recorded in the Mozarabic Chronicle.

The traditional explanation for the rapid fall of the Visigothic kingdom has been decadence. The late ninth-century Chronica Prophetica indeed blames the Goths' defeat on their lack of penance for their sins: "The city of Toledo, victor of all peoples, succumbed as a victim to the triumphant Ishmaelites, and deserved to be subjected to them. Thus Spain was ruined for its disgusting sins, in the 380th year of the Goths." This is not accepted by specialists today, though it still exerts heavy influence through tertiary accounts, especially in Spanish-language historiography.

== Legend ==
Among the legends which have accrued to the history of the battle, the most prominent is that of Count Julian, who, in revenge for the impregnation of his daughter Florinda (the later Cava Rumía or Doña Cava) by Roderic while the young woman was being raised at the palace school, supposedly lent Ṭāriq the necessary ships to launch an invasion. That the Arabs already possessed sufficient naval forces in the western Mediterranean is attested by their activities against the Balearic Islands. While the impregnation (and the name of his daughter) are universally disregarded, the Count Julian of the Arabic histories has been identified with a Berber Catholic named Urban who appears in the Mozarabic Chronicle. This Urban accompanied Mūsā across the straits. Urban may be the Julian of legend, but more likely Julian is the legend of Urban. According to one interpretation of the Urban-Julian legend, he was a Byzantine governor of Ceuta who joined with the Arabs to raid the southern coasts of Iberia in 710 with Ṭārif. Glick has suggested that Ṭārif is an invention designed to explain the etymology of Tarifa, the ancient Julia Traducta, of which "Julian" was probably the (unnamed) Gothic count (comes julianus).

The "sons of Wittiza" that figure so prominently in later Christian sources, are likewise unhistorical. Wittiza, who is praised by the Mozarabic Chronicle, is almost universally vilified in subsequent works, beginning with the Chronicle of Moissac around 818. The outrageousness of the accusations is proportional to the chronological distance of the narrative. Thus, Lucas de Tuy, writing in the late thirteenth century, portrays a monster, while Rodrigo Jiménez de Rada, rectifying the disparate accounts, shows Wittiza commencing his reign with promise and evolving into a tyrant. The Monk of Silos around 1115 recorded that the sons of Wittiza fled from Roderic to Julian and enlisted his aid.

Among the other legends surrounding the battle is that of Roderic's arrival at the field in a chariot drawn by eight white mules.

There are other legends concerning the conquest, such as the legends of the sealed chamber in Toledo ("la maison fermée de Tolède") and the table (or carpet, depending on the translation) of Solomon that ʿAbd al-Ḥakam alleges was also discovered in Toledo. There was indeed a table that was captured by Tariq ibn Ziyad from Almeida, and transported by Musa ibn Nusair to Damascus. Tariq broke one leg, and kept it, making a replacement leg for the table. When both Tariq and Musa reached the Caliph in Damascus (either Al-Walid, or Sulayman) each claimed that they were the one who captured it. Tariq showed the original leg as proof that he did, causing the Caliph to impose hefty fines on Musa. While several Muslim chroniclers say that it was indeed a table of Solomon, others refute this claim, and attribute it to lay people attributing fantastical objects and deeds to Solomon. These include Ibn Hayyan, the polymath Al-Biruni and Al-Himyari. All mention that it was made from endowments to churches by kings and wealthy

Roderic's golden sandal was allegedly recovered from the Guadalete river. The nineteenth-century American military history writer Henry Coppée penned a history of the conquest which incorporates and retells many of the legends.
