= Conquest of Andalusia =

Conquest of Andalusia may refer to:

- Fath Al-Andalus, a Kuwaiti-Syrian television series
- Muslim conquest of the Iberian Peninsula
- The Reconquista
