= Abd al-Rahman ibn Umm al-Hakam al-Thaqafi =

7th-century Umayyad governor of Kufa

ʿAbd al-Raḥmān ibn Umm al-Ḥakam al-Thaqafī
- عبد الرحمن بن عبد الله بن عثمان بن عبد الله بن ربيعة الثقفي

Umayyad governor of Kufa
- In office 678–679
- Monarch: Muʿāwiya I
- Preceded by: al-Ḍaḥḥak ibn Qays
- Succeeded by: al-Nuʿmān ibn Bashīr

Personal details
- Children: Al-Ḥurr ibn ʿAbd al-Raḥmān al-Thaqafī
- Parent(s): ʿAbd Allāh ibn ʿUthmān al-Thaqafi (father); Umm al-Ḥakam bint Abī Sufyān (mother)

ʿAbd al-Raḥmān ibn ʿAbd Allāh ibn ʿUthmān ibn ʿAbd Allāh ibn Rabīʿa al-Thaqafī (Arabic: عبد الرحمن بن عبد الله بن عثمان بن عبد الله بن ربيعة الثقفي), called Ibn Umm al-Ḥakam (Arabic: إبن أم الحكم), was a governor and military leader in the early Umayyad Caliphate. He was a nephew of the Caliph Muʿāwiya I through the latter's sister, Umm al-Ḥakam, and her Thaqafī husband.

According to al-Ṭabarī, Ibn Umm al-Ḥakam campaigned in Byzantine territory in 673. In 678, his uncle appointed him governor of Kūfa in place of al-Ḍaḥḥak ibn Qays. According to Ibn Khayyāt, however, this took place a year earlier. According to al-Ṭabarī, he governed for two years. He dealt with a Kharijite rebellion, but his rule was considered oppressive and he was forced out by the Kūfans. In 679, he was replaced by al-Nuʿmān ibn Bashīr.

Having been ousted from Kūfa, Ibn Umm al-Ḥakam was appointed governor of Egypt by his uncle. According to al-Ṭabarī, he was prevented from taking up his office by Muʿāwiya ibn Ḥudayj al-Sakūnī, who reportedly said, "by my life, you shall not treat us the way you treated our Kūfan brothers". This story is also found in Ibn Taghrībardī and Ibn al-Athīr, but it al-Sakūnī is known to have died in 672. The cause of the discrepancy in the accounts is unclear.

According to al-Balādhurī, Ibn Umm al-Ḥakam also served as governor of the Jazīra and Mosul. The Caliph ʿAbd al-Malik ibn Marwān (685–705) appointed him governor of Damascus.

The prominent Andalusian leaders Tammām ibn ʿAlḳama al-Thaqafī and Tammām ibn ʿAlḳama al-Wazīr were descended from a mawlā (freedman) of Ibn Umm al-Ḥakam and took their nisba from him.

== Bibliography ==
- Crone, Patricia (1980). Slaves on Horses: The Evolution of the Islamic Polity (1980 ed.). Cambridge: Cambridge University Press. ISBN 978-0521229616.
- James, David, ed. (2012). A History of Early al-Andalus: The Akhbār majmūʿa: A Study of the Unique Arabic Manuscript in the Bibliothèque Nationale de France, Paris, with a Translation, Notes and Comments. London and New York: Routledge.
- Morony, Michael G., ed. (1987). The History of al-Ṭabarī, Volume XVIII: Between Civil Wars: The Caliphate of Muʿāwiyah, 661–680 A.D./A.H. 40–60. SUNY Series in Near Eastern Studies. Albany, New York: State University of New York Press. ISBN 978-0-87395-933-9.
- Pellat, Charles (1993). "Muʿāwiya b. Ḥudaydj". In Bosworth, C. E.; van Donzel, E.; Heinrichs, W. P. & Pellat, Ch. (eds.). The Encyclopaedia of Islam, Second Edition. Volume VII: Mif–Naz. Leiden: E. J. Brill. p. 269. ISBN 978-90-04-09419-2.
