= Battle of Écija (711) =

Battle of the Muslim conquest of Iberia

- Part of Muslim conquest of the Iberian Peninsula
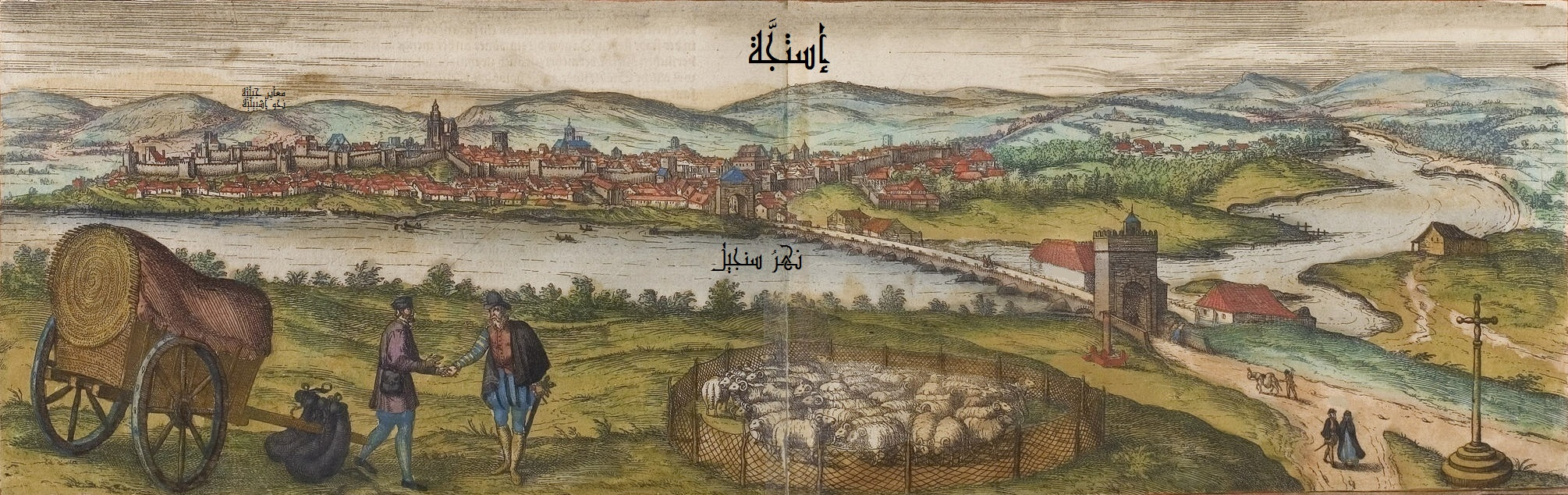
- City of Écija
Date	Mid-August 711
Location	Écija, Spain
Result	Umayyad victory
Territorial changes	Écija falls to Muslims

Belligerents
Visigothic Kingdom	Umayyad Caliphate

Commanders and leaders
Unknown	Ṭāriq ibn Ziyad

Strength
Unknown	Unknown

Casualties and losses
Heavy	Heavy

The Battle of Écija was a military engagement between the Umayyad Muslims and the remaining Visigoths who survived the battle of Guadalete. The battle ended in Muslim victory.

== Background ==
After the Muslim victory at Guadalete, the Umayyad general Tariq bin Ziyad marched towards Córdoba to capture it in early August 711. Tariq gave no quarter for the Visigoth as he marched, eliminating any resistance on his way. The first place Tariq reached was Morón de la Frontera; however, the town offered no resistance and surrendered. Afterwards, Tariq set off to Córdoba. Going north-east, he stopped at Écija. The city of Écija was an important bastion that controlled movements in different directions. Many Visigoth who survived the battle of Guadalete took refuge at Écija.

== Battle ==
Tariq arrived in Écija around mid-August and found a strong army of Visigoth concentrated outside the city. Tariq began preparing his forces for battle and marched to meet their enemy. Details regarding the battle are unknown; however, it was described as fierce and bloody, during which the Muslims sustained heavy losses in terms of killed and wounded. The battle has been described as the second fiercest battle after Guadalete. Nevertheless, the battle ended in favor of the Muslims and the complete route of the Visigoth.

Afterwards, Tariq then besieged the city. Tariq approached the city from a spring four miles from the town. When the Visigoth saw him attack, they retreated and left the city for Toledo. Thus, Écija fell to Muslim hands. According to Ahmad al-Maqqari, Tariq made a pact with its inhabitants to be spared if hostilities ceased and paid tribute. Afterwards, Tariq divided his troops at Écija and dispatched the general Mughith al-Rumi to conquer Córdoba.

== Sources ==
- Agha Ibrahim Akram (2004), The Muslim Conquest of Spain.
- David James (2012), A History of Early Al-Andalus, The Akhbar Majmu'a.
- Richard Hitchcock (2014), Muslim Spain Reconsidered, From 711 to 1502.
