= Kaula al-Yahudi =

Fictional Jewish general

Kaula al-Yahudi Fictional historical figure invented by Faustino de Borbón
- Born: c. 685; Ceuta
- Died: 718; Lerida, Catalonia
- Military career
- Allegiance: Umayyad Caliphate
- Conflicts: Battle of Guadalete

Kaula al Yahudi, or Julan the Jew (c. 685–718), is a fictional Jewish general created by the librarian and pseudohistorian Faustino de Borbón in order to dissociate Wittizia from the Arab conquest of the Visigothic Kingdom. Faustino de Borbón explicitly linked Julan to Julian, Count of Ceuta in order to create a conspiracy theory about a plot by Julan to conquer the Iberian Peninsula. Most of his work was refuted by the Arabists such as Pablo Hodar, Francisco Codera y Zaidín and José Godoy Alcántara due to the presence of forgeries in his sources.

Despite the criticism, the character of Julan the Jew was adopted by Gayangos, who removed the element of the deceitful Jew and orientalized his name as Kaula. Heinrich Graetz intended to write a monumental work compiling the history of the Jews, for this reason, he took up it as a minor detail and ultimately removed the connection between Count Julian and Kaula the Jew. Similarly, Amador de los Ríos incorporated Gayangos's version into his work on the Jews of the Iberian Peninsula, adding details about Kaula's participation in the Battle of Guadalete and his rebellion in Lérida.
