= Al-Ghazal =

Andalusi Arab poet and diplomat (c. 790–864)

Abū Zakariyyāʾ Yaḥyā ibn Ḥakam al-Bakrī al-Jayyānī (c. 790–864), nicknamed al-Ghazāl ('the gazelle'), was an Andalusi Arab poet and diplomat. He undertook two important missions for the Emirate of Córdoba, the first to the Byzantine Empire in 840 and the second to the Vikings in 845.

A native of Jaén, he received the nickname al-ghazāl in his youth because he was thin and handsome. He was a Muslim who belonged to the Arab tribe of Bakr ibn Wāʾil. The 11th-century historian Ibn Ḥayyān called him "the sage of Spain" (ḥakīm al-andalus), and the 13th-century writer Ibn Diḥya devoted more space to his diplomacy than his poetry in his Melodious Compilation from the Poetry of the People of the West. Ibn Diḥya is the only source for the Viking embassy, which he claims to have read about in a now lost work by al-Ghazāl's contemporary, Tammām ibn ʿAlḳama.

In 839 or 840, the Emir ʿAbd al-Raḥmān II sent al-Ghazāl on a mission to the court of the Byzantine Emperor Theophilos. This was a follow-up to Theophilos' own embassy to Córdoba seeking an alliance against the Abbasids. Bearing a response from ʿAbd al-Raḥmān to the letter of Theophilos, al-Ghazāl and his co-ambassador Yaḥyā (called ṣāḥib al-munayqila, the man with the little clock) accompanied the Byzantine ambassador back to Constantinople. There are numerous anecdotes concerning al-Ghazāl's embassy.

Ibn Ḥayyān presents three accounts of the embassy. The first, based on al-Ghazāl's poetry and possibly on legends, is not entirely reliable. The future Michael III, an infant at the time, is portrayed as an adult. The purpose of this account is to amuse the reader. According to this account, when al-Ghazāl refused to perform the customary proskynesis, Theophilos had the doorway leading to his dais lowered so as to force the ambassador to enter on his knees. Instead, al-Ghazāl went through feet first on his back. The emperor was impressed by his cleverness. Ibn Ḥayyān's other accounts are based on the histories of Ḥasan ibn Muḥammad ibn Muffarij al-Qubbashī and ʿĪsā al-Rāzī. Al-Qubbasī shows al-Ghazāl signing a pact of friendship with the Byzantines, while al-Razī calls him an astrologer.

According to Ibn Diḥya, in 844 or 845 the Majūs (his name for the Vikings) launched a raid on Seville and were repulsed by ʿAbd al-Raḥmān II. Afterwards:

A Majūs ambassador came to make peace with ʿAbd al-Raḥmān, who sent al-Ghazāl on an embassy to the Majūs king, for al-Ghazāl had great presence of mind, and no door remained closed to him. Al-Ghazāl took costly presents with him on board, and sailed in his own ship along with the Majūs ship. He arrived at one of their islands, where he rested and repaired his ship. The Majūs ambassador then sailed first to announce his arrival. They sailed to where the king resided. It was a great island in the ocean, and in it were running waters and gardens. It was three days' journey from the continent. Innumerable Majūs were there, and near were many other isles, small and great inhabited by Majūs and the continent up there also belongs to them. It is a large country and it takes several days to pass through it. Majūs were then heathen, but are now Christians.

Ibn Diḥya, however, was considered unreliable in his own day. Moreover, his account contains elements that could only have entered the story in the 11th century or later: al-Ghazāl is said to have returned by way of Santiago de Compostela, an insignificant site in 845, and the Vikings converted to Christianity over a century later. It has been suggested that the entire Viking embassy story is a legend that arose from the conflation of the Byzantine embassy and the Viking raid on Seville in 844.

Ibn Diḥya quotes extensively from al-Ghazāl's poems. One in "the Arabic tradition of courtly love" describes his flirtation with the queen of the Vikings while her husband looked on.

You have to resist, Oh my heart, a love that troubles thee, and against which you defend yourself as a lion. You are in love with a Majūsiya, who never lets the sun of beauty set, and who lives at the rarely visited extremity of the world.

In another poem al-Ghazāl criticizes his nephew for playing chess, a sinful and diabolical game introduced to Córdoba in his lifetime by the musician Ziryāb.

== Bibliography ==
- Allen, W. E. D. (1960). The Poet and the Spae-Wife: An Attempt to Reconstruct al-Ghazal's visit to the Vikings (PDF). Titus Wilson and Son. First published in Saga-Book of the Viking Club 15 (3): 149–258.
- Cardoso, Elsa (2015). "The Poetics of the Scenography of Power: The Embassy of Yaḥya al-Ghazāl to Constantinople". Hamsa: Journal of Judaic and Islamic Studies. 2: 54–64.
- Christys, Ann (2015). Vikings in the South: Voyages to Iberia and the Mediterranean. Bloomsbury.
- González Campo, Mariano, ed. (2002). Al-Ghazal y la embajada hispano-musulmana a los vikingos en el siglo IX. Miraguano.
- González López, José Luis (1954). "El jaenero al-Gazal: Yahya ben Hakam al Bakri" (PDF). Boletín del Instituto de Estudios Giennenses. 6: 27–82.
- Hermes, Nizar F. (2014). "The Moor's First Sight: An Arab Poet in a Ninth-Century Viking Court". In Anne R. Richards; Iraj Omidvar (eds.). Historic Engagements with Occidental Cultures, Religions, Powers. Springer. pp. 57–69. doi:10.1057/9781137405029_3. ISBN 978-1-349-48757-8.
- Huici Miranda, Ambrosio (1965). "al-Ghazāl". In Lewis, B.; Pellat, Ch. & Schacht, J. (eds.). The Encyclopaedia of Islam, Second Edition. Volume II: C–G. Leiden: E. J. Brill. p. 1038. OCLC 495469475.
- Lévi-Provençal, Évariste (1937). "Un échange d'ambassades entre Cordoue et Byzance au IX^{e} siècle". Byzantion. 12: 1–24. JSTOR 44169700.
- Pons-Sanz, Sarah M. (2004). "Whom Did al-Ghazal Meet? An Exchange of Embassies between the Arabs from al-Andalus and the Vikings" (PDF). Saga-Book of the Viking Club. 28: 5–28.
- Roldán Castro, Fátima; Díaz Macías, Pedro; Díaz Rolando, Emilio (1988). "Bizancio y Al-Andalus, embajadas y relaciones" (PDF). Erytheia: Revista de estudios bizantinos y neogriegos. 2 (9): 263–283.
- Signes Codoñer, Juan (2014). The Emperor Theophilos and the East: Court and Frontier in Byzantium during the Last Phase of Iconoclasm. Routledge.
- Stefánsson, Jón (1909). "The Vikings in Spain: From Arab (Moorish) and Spanish Sources" (PDF). Saga-Book of the Viking Club. 6: 31–46.
