= Spanish era =

Calendar era used in medieval Spain

The Spanish era or Hispanic era (Latin: Æra Hispanica), sometimes called the era of Caesar, was a calendar era (year numbering system) commonly used in the states of the Iberian Peninsula from the 5th century until the 15th, when it was phased out in favour of the Anno Domini (AD) system. The epoch (start date) of the Spanish era was 1 January 38 BC. To convert an Anno Domini date to the corresponding year in the Spanish era, add 38 to the Anno Domini year, such that Era 941 would be equivalent to AD 903. A date given in the Spanish era always uses the word era followed by a feminine ordinal number (when written out instead of given in Roman numerals). This contrasts with the AD system that uses the masculine anno (year): i.e., era millesima octava versus anno millesimo octavo.

The reasons behind the choice of 38 BC are unknown. It has been suggested that it may result from an Easter table that began with that year (rather than the Incarnation). Isidore of Seville in his Etymologiae (early 7th century) included an explanation of the meaning of Latin aera, plural of aes (bronze, brass, copper). "An era", writes Isidore, "according to the sequence of the years was set up by Caesar Augustus when he first levied a general tax and mapped the Roman world [i.e., in 38 BC]. It was called aera because the whole world pledged itself to deliver copper to the state." In reality, the meaning of "period of time" for aera comes from the use of bronze counters in calculations.

The Spanish era was used throughout the Visigothic Kingdom, which covered all of the Iberian Peninsula and the region of Septimania. It was even used in parts of North Africa. It continued in use in these regions but gradually fell away before the end of the Middle Ages. Official usage of the era ceased in different parts of the peninsula at different times: Catalonia dropped the era (as well as the French king's regnal year) in AD 1180, Aragon in 1349/1350, Valencia in 1358, Castile in 1382/1383, Portugal in 1420/1422 and Navarre in the early 15th century. While the year officially began on 1 January under the Spanish era, that was changed to 25 December when the Anno Domini system was adopted (while the Church used 11 January).

In al-Andalus under Muslim rule, the Spanish era was called the taʾrīkh al-ṣufr. This has been interpreted by Ignác Goldziher as "European era", from taʾrīkh (date, era, annals) and aṣfar (yellow, pale, red), a word which came to be applied to Greeks, then Romans and by the Middle Ages to Europeans in general, the Banuʾl-Aṣfar ("sons of the yellow one"). Alternatively, Giorgio Levi Della Vida interprets it as "Bronze Era", with ṣufr corresponding to Latin aera, i.e. "bronze." This derivation is supported by a legend recorded in the 12th-century Chronica Gothorum Pseudoisidoriana and interpolated in the Arabic translation of Orosius' Historiae adversus paganos. According to this legend, Augustus in 38 BC taxed the whole empire in bronze or copper coin and melted it down to make plates with which he covered the banks of the Tiber.

== Example ==
The dating clause from the act of donation of 11 August 1137 whereby King Ramiro II of Aragon betrothed his daughter Petronilla to Count Raymond Berengar IV of Barcelona and handed his kingdom over to him. The year is given in two forms: anno incarnationis Dominice CXXXVII post millesimum ("year of the incarnation of the Lord 1137") and Era millesima centesima LXXVI ("Era 1176").

== Sources ==
- Cheney, Carl D.; Jones, Michael (2000). A Handbook of Dates: For Students of British History (Rev. ed.). Cambridge University Press.
- de Blois, F. C. (2000). "Taʾrīkh: I. Dates and eras in the Islamic world, 1. In the sense of "date, dating", etc.". In Bearman, P. J.; Bianquis, Th.; Bosworth, C. E.; van Donzel, E. & Heinrichs, W. P. (eds.). The Encyclopaedia of Islam, Second Edition. Volume X: T–U. Leiden: E. J. Brill. pp. 257–264. ISBN 978-90-04-11211-7.
- Goldziher, Ignác (1960). "Aṣfar". In Gibb, H. A. R.; Kramers, J. H.; Lévi-Provençal, E.; Schacht, J.; Lewis, B. & Pellat, Ch. (eds.). The Encyclopaedia of Islam, Second Edition. Volume I: A–B. Leiden: E. J. Brill. pp. 687–688. OCLC 495469456.
- Levi Della Vida, Giorgio (1943). "The 'Bronze Era' in Moslem Spain". Journal of the American Oriental Society. 63 (3): 183–191. doi:10.2307/593870. JSTOR 593870.
- Merzbach, Uta C. (1983). "Calendars and Reckoning of Time". In Strayer, Joseph R. (ed.). Dictionary of the Middle Ages. Vol. 3. Charles Scribner's Sons. pp. 17–30.
- Roth, Norman (2003). "Calendar". In Gerli, E. Michael (ed.). Medieval Iberia: An Encyclopedia. Routledge. p. 190. ISBN 978-0-415-93918-8.
