= Akhbār majmūʿa =

Anonymous history manuscript about Moorish Iberia

The Akhbār majmūʿa fī fatḥ al-Andalus ("Collection of Anecdotes on the Conquest of al-Andalus") is an anonymous history of al-Andalus compiled in the second decade of the 11th century and only preserved in a single manuscript, now in the Bibliothèque Nationale de France. Parts of it date to the 8th and 9th centuries, and it is the earliest Arabic history of al-Andalus, covering the period from the Arab conquest (711) until the reign of the Caliph Abd ar-Rahman III (929–61). The Akhbār majmūʿa is sometimes called the "Anonymous of Paris", after the home of its manuscript, or the "Anonymous of Córdoba", after its presumed place of origin.

The Akhbār majmūʿa records how, during the Abbasid Revolution, an army of ten thousand under a certain Balj marched to al-Andalus to support the Umayyad emir Abd ar-Rahman I. The story appears to be borrowed from the Anabasis of Xenophon. Likewise, the anonymous compiler borrows elements, such as Roderic's alleged kidnapping of the daughter of Count Julian, from other classical sources, namely the Aeneid and the Iliad. Besides these literary embellishments, the Akhbār majmūʿa is generally free of legend. The Spanish historian Ramón Menéndez Pidal argued that since the anonymous author was clearly aiming for historical accuracy, he should be generally trusted, even on the doubtful episode of Count Julian's daughter. The Akhbār majmūʿa makes no mention of Jews in connection with the Arab conquest.

Abū Ghālib Tammām ibn ʿAlḳama (died 811) may have been an important source for the section of the Akhbār called the "Syrian chronicle", which covers the period 741–788.

== Editions ==
- James, David. A History of Early al-Andalus: The Akhbār majmūʿa. A Study of the Unique Arabic Manuscript in the Bibliothèque Nationale de France, Paris, with a Translation, Notes and Comments. London and New York: Routledge, 2012.
- Lafuente y Alcántara, Emilio. Ajbar Machmua: Crónica anónima del siglo XI. Dada a luz por primera vez. Madrid, 1867.
