= Siege of Córdoba (711) =

Umayyad victory over the Visigoths in Spain

- Part of Umayyad conquest of Hispania
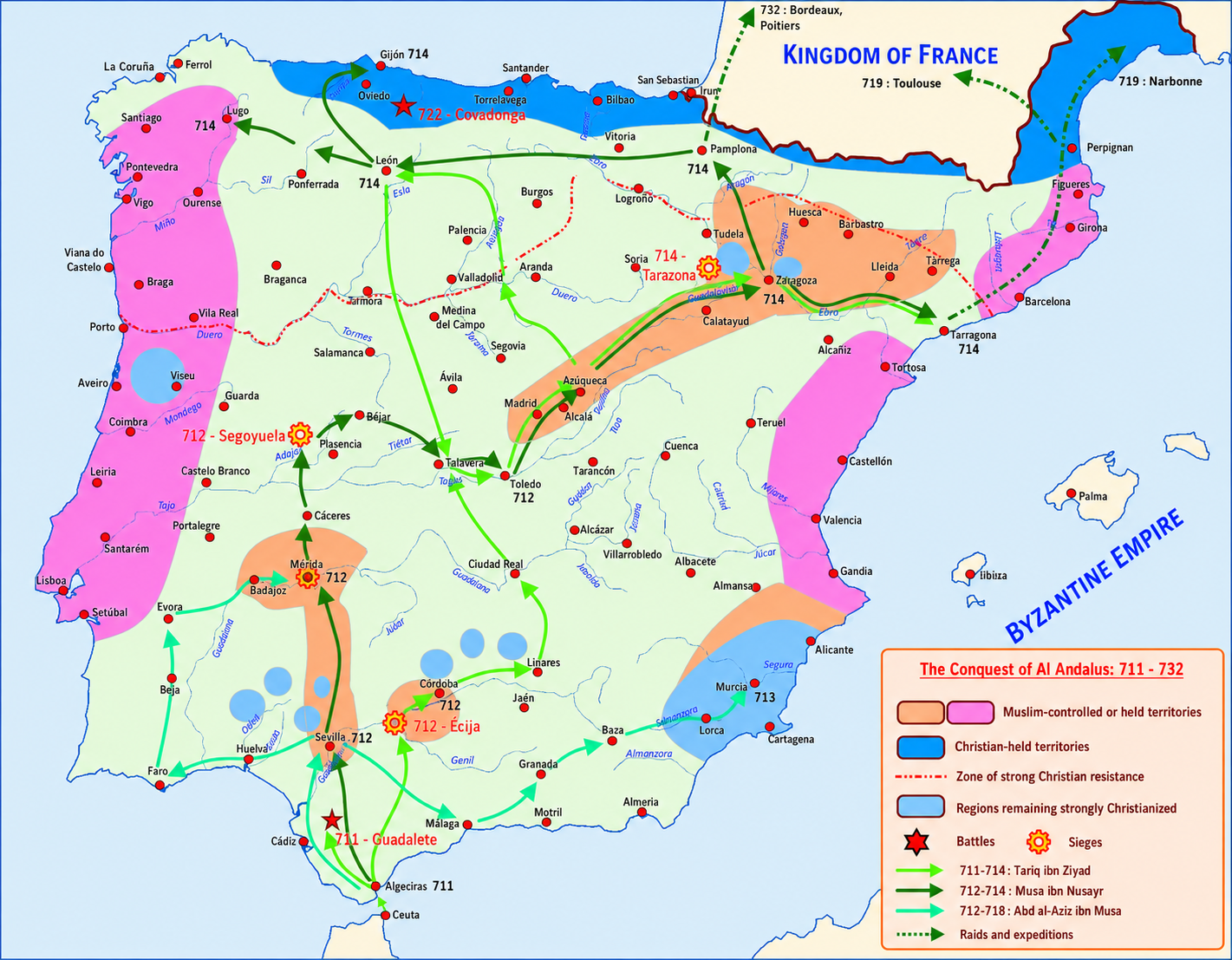
- Tariq's advances in Spain
Date	July–October 711
Location	Córdoba, Spain
Result	Umayyad victory

Belligerents
Visigothic Kingdom	Umayyad Caliphate

Commanders and leaders
Unknown	Mughith al-Rumi

Strength
400 men	700 cavalry

Casualties and losses
All killed	Unknown

In 711, the Umayyads besieged the city of Córdoba for three months. The Umayyads managed to capture the city, and the entire Visigoth garrison was slain.

== Prelude ==
After the Umayyad victory at the Battle of Guadalete and the death of King Roderic, the Visigothic kingdom was torn apart by internal conflicts. Every governor of each province acted independently, such that cities like Córdoba, Seville, and Toledo had their own kings. To prevent the Visigoths from reuniting, Tariq ibn Ziyad decided to strike the capital, Toledo, while also dispatching several units to capture other cities. Tariq dispatched a Byzantine convert from north Africa named Mughith al-Rumi to capture Córdoba.

== Siege ==
Mughith was dispatched to capture Córdoba with a force of 700 cavalry. Córdoba was located north of the Guadalquivir River; it was a city with many gates. Mughith encamped between the Guadalquivir River and a village called Tercial. He sent his scouts on a reconnaissance mission and returned with news that the bridge to cross the river had been destroyed. They also found a shepherd who had information regarding the city. He told them that the city was abandoned by its inhabitants, leaving only the poor, and that it was garrisoned with only 400 men. Mughith ordered each of the two soldiers to mount on one horse to cross the river, but that would be risky as the guards would be notified by the sounds of the horses and would be exposed to the garrison's arrows and javelins.

However, a storm hit the city and forced the guards to seek shelter. Mughith used this and immediately crossed the river with his men. Having crossed the river, the shepherd led the Muslims into a breach; however, it was small. Now left with no protection, Mughith found a tree next to a gate. He ordered one of the soldiers to climb the tree and jump on the wall. Mugith opened his turban and threw it at the wall to create a rope to climb. Having enough soldiers, he ordered them to open the gates and attack the guards, which they did.

The governor and his men escaped towards a church called San Acisclo, which was fortified like a citadel and had supplies that could last a long time. The Muslims managed to occupy the city. The inhabitants did not resist the invaders, allowing the Muslims to settle. Mughith had no siege equipment to attack the church-like citadel and waited until the garrison's supplies ran out. The siege continued for more than three months. Frustrated with no results, Mughith decided to send one of his slaves to enter the garden of the church and hide behind shrubs to capture one of the goths. However, the slave ended up being captured but managed to escape and inform Mughith about the water channel that supplies the garrison.

Mughith ordered local engineers to stop the flow of water to the garrison, which they did. The governor attempted to escape, leaving his men behind; however, he was captured. Mughith then ordered the garrison to surrender but refused. The Umayyads managed to breach the citadel and slay the entire garrison, and, by the end of October, the Muslims now controlled Córdoba.

== Sources ==
- Agha Ibrahim Akram, The Muslim Conquest of Spain.
- Abdulwahid Dhanun Taha, Ariel Bension, & Ramón Menéndez Pidal, Routledge Library Editions: Muslim Spain.
- Ibn 'Idhari, Al-Bayan al-Mughrib, Vol II.
