= Abdel Wahid bin Yazid el-Iskandarani =

Egyptian vizier (9th century – 851)

Abd el-Wahid bin Yazid el-Iskandarani
- Born: 9th century Alexandria
- Died: 851 AD; Emirate of Córdoba
- Military career
- Allegiance: Emirate of Córdoba
- Branch: Córdoban army
- Conflicts: Revolt of Toledo (836-837); Campaign against Galicia (840); Campaign against Catalonia (841); Viking raid on Seville (844); Invasion of Alba (848); Campaign against the Franks (850)

Abd el-Wahid bin Yazid el-Iskandarani (Egyptian Arabic: عبد الواحد بن يزيد الإسكندراني) (9th century – 851 AD), was an Egyptian vizier of the Emirate of Córdoba in the Iberian Peninsula, singer, poet, writer and military commander.

The Commander-Vizier Abdel Wahid bin Yazid el-Iskandarani is considered the most prominent Alexandrian figure to enter Al-Andalus during the era of the Umayyad dynasty. He was able, within a short period, to rise to the highest major positions in Cordoba, the capital of the Umayyads in Al-Andalus.

== Early life ==
He was originally a poet, writer, and singer who made a living and traveled to all North African countries to spread his poetry and singing until he reached Al-Andalus.

== Contact with Abd ar-Rahman II ==
The Andalusian historian Ibn Hayyan Al-Qurtubi mentions, among the virtues of the chamberlain’s morals, Isa bin Shuhayd, his good deeds with Abdel Wahid bin Yazid, and says:

“Who is famous for his action regarding Abdel Wahid bin Yazid el-Iskandarani, for he came to Andalusia as a polite and pleasant young man. He used to sing some songs according to the sects of Islam.” Then he clung to the rope of Ibn Shuhayd, who was the companion of Emir Abd ar-Rahman ibn al-Hakam, but he did not do well with him. He said to him: Stop singing at all, for it makes you suspicious in our opinion. Be careful with your etiquette and pay attention to your luck, for you have qualities that attract your hyena! So Abdel Wahid did that, and stuck with Isa. So Isa gave Abdel Wahid's information to Emir Abd ar-Rahman, and brought it to him, and he struck him as Isa had described to him, so his soul accepted Abdel Wahid, and his luck moved him, so he lowered his status and strengthened his privacy, until he regretted it and became comfortable with it. Then he used him and transferred him to positions of service until he gave him authority in the city, then he promoted him as a Vizier and gave him leadership. ".

From this text it becomes clear to us that Abdel Wahid ibn Yazid el-Iskandarani came to Cordoba at the beginning of the reign of Prince Abd ar-Rahman II. He was an extroverted speaker, inclined to literature, and used to sing a bit. He contacted the chamberlain Isa ibn Shuhayd, who was known for his talent and intelligence, and he advised him to refrain from singing and to just continue with literature, el-Iskandarani complied with the advice of the chamberlain, whom he trusted, and gained a high position with him. In turn, he brought him to Prince Abd ar-Rahman al-II, who admired him and lowered his status, and made him one of his own. Then he entrusted him with the plan of the owner of the city in the metropolis of Cordoba, and after that he promoted him to become his vizier and gain leadership.

== Quelling internal strife ==
The Vizier Commander Abdel Wahid el-Iskandarani contributed to putting down some of the internal strife and revolutions that broke out during the reign of Prince Abd ar-Rahman II, including his leadership of the Umayyad campaign directed at Toledo in the year 221 AH / 836 AD to put down the revolt of its people who had rebelled against the central government in Cordoba, so Prince Abd ar-Rahman sent to them a military force from Rabah Castle, south of Toledo, besieged the city and cut off its control, which exhausted its people. After that, the Egyptian commander Abdel Wahid marched towards them with his army, and was able to storm the walls of Toledo and forcefully conquer it in the month of Rajab in the year 222 AH / 837 AD, then he organized its affairs, and ordered the reconstruction and fortification of the Kasbah, (the citadel), which was founded by Amrous Al-Washq, during the reign of Prince Al-Hakam bin Hisham Al-Rabadi, at Bab Al-Jisr, and thus restored calm and stability to that city, which had always disturbed the Umayyads with its continuous revolts.

== Confronting the Crusaders ==
The role of the leader Abdel Wahid el-Iskandarani was not limited to suppressing internal revolts, but he also participated in the fighting against the Crusaders of Galicia and the Crusaders of Catalonia, and he did well in that. In the year 226 AH / 840 AD, Prince Abd ar-Rahman II sent a squadron to the Kingdom of Galicia, headed by his son al-Mutarrif, and accompanied by the leader Abdel Wahid who defeated the Crusaders of Galicia and returned victorious to Cordoba. In the year 227 AH / 841 AD, Prince Abd al-Rahman ordered a military campaign to be launched into Catalonia, and assigned its leadership to Abdel Wahid el-Iskandarani, who penetrated into Catalan territory and destroyed some of their forts in the Shartaniya region on the borders of Gaul (France). Commander Abdel Wahid reached, in his march, the borders of Arbonne, south of France.

== Confronting the Normans ==
Commander Abdel Wahid had efforts during the Norman raid on the western coast of Al-Andalus during the reign of Prince Abd ar-Rahman II. In the year 230 AH / 844 AD, Norman ships advanced from the coast of Ashbon and the Muslims engaged in fighting with them. Then they occupied the island of Quttil near Seville and stayed there for three days, after which they headed to the village of Qawra. There, a battle took place between them and the Muslims in Qawra Fort, which resulted in the defeat of the Muslims in the fort. Then the Normans entered the town of Toliata, south of Seville, whose people were unable to withstand, and many of them were killed. As a result, they entered the city of Seville, where they rampaged through looting, killing, and vandalism, and burned the roofs of the mosque of Seville.

Prince Abd ar-Rahman II mobilized the Muslims for jihad, and a large army emerged from Cordoba, headed by the chamberlain Isa bin Shuhayd and senior commanders such as Abdel Wahid el-Iskandarani, Ibn Kulayb, and Ibn Rustum. The battle took place between the two sides, in which the Muslims remained steadfast and defeated the Normans who fled to their ships. Another battle took place in In Toledo, the Normans were defeated and about five hundred of them were killed, including their fleet commander. Thirty of their ships were burned, and after that they were forced to withdraw to Bala, and from there they headed to Ashbon, where their news ceased.

== Continuing the fight against the Crusaders ==
After the success of the Muslims in repelling that Norman raid on the coasts of Al-Andalus, Prince Abd ar-Rahman began to devote himself to continuing the fighting against the Crusaders in the north, so he sent a campaign in 234 AH / 848 AD, headed by his son Al-Mundhir, and with him in leadership was the Vizier Abdel Wahid. Ibn Al-Athir states that the objectives of this campaign were to attack the Alba region in the north, deter its inhabitants, and ward off their danger from the Andalusian borders adjacent to them. In 236 AH / 850 AD, Abd ar-Rahman II sent an army led by Abdel Wahid ibn Yazid el-Iskandarani in a disciplinary campaign against the Franks, which reached the city of Arbonne.

== Death ==
Vizier Abdel Wahid el-Iskandarani died in 237 AH / 851 AD, a year after the last campaign, recording bright pages in Andalusian history with his heroism and military contributions.

== Legacy ==
The Arab sources did not provide us with any information about the descendants of this leader except a brief reference provided by Ibn Adhari al-Marrakshi, in which he alluded to one of his grandchildren, called Abdel Wahid bin Mahammad bin Abdel Wahid el-Iskandarani, who died early in the reign of Caliph Abd al-Rahman al-Nasser in the year 309 AH. It is likely that he was a person of intelligence in the city of Cordoba, and perhaps one of the prominent figures close to the Caliph. Because Ibn Adhari only mentions in his book the deaths of important people, including ministers, writers, leaders, and scholars in the Umayyad era.
