= Abu Ghalib Tammam ibn Alqama =

8th-century Umayyad Arab military leader in al-Andalus

Abū Ghālib Tammām ibn ʿAlqama al-Thaqafī (Arabic: أبو غالب تمام بن علقمة الثقفي), also transliterated Ibn ʿAlḳama al-Thaḳafī (720×728 – 811), was an Arab military leader in al-Andalus during the establishment of the ʿUmayyad Emirate of Córdoba.

Ibn ʿAlqama was descended from a mawlā (freedman) of ʿAbd al-Raḥmān ibn Umm al-Ḥakam, the governor of Kūfa in Iraq in 678 under the first ʿUmayyad caliph, Muʿāwiya I. He thus belonged to the tribe of Thaqīf and the faction of Ḳays. He was born between 720 and 728.

He arrived in al-Andalus in 741 in the ṭalīʿa (vanguard) of the Syrian army of Balj ibn Bishr. When the ʿUmayyad prince ʿAbd al-Raḥmān I made his play to restore ʿUmayyad rule in al-Andalus in 755, Ibn ʿAlqama was one of the first to rally to his banner after the ʿUmayyad's agents met with al-Ṣumayl ibn Ḥātim in Zaragoza. With the mawlā Badr, he rescued ʿAbd al-Raḥmān from the Berbers in Africa later that year. He became ʿAbd al-Raḥmān's chief minister (ḥājib) with the rank of ḳāʾid in his army. Assisted by Badr, he captured the city of Toledo in 764 and became its governor. Afterwards he was appointed governor of Huesca, Tortosa and Tarazona. His son Ghālib succeeded him at Toledo, but was executed by ʿAbd al-Raḥmān's successor, Hishām I, in 788. Ibn ʿAlqama remained loyal to the dynasty, however, and rose to prominence again under al-Ḥakam I (796–822). He died in 811 at a very advanced age. His great-great-grandson, Tammām ibn ʿAlqama al-Thaqafī, was also prominent in ʿUmayyad service.

Ibn ʿAlqama is the most probable source for the account of the period 741–788 in the Akhbār majmūʿa, which is the earliest Arabic history of al-Andalus. This section of the Akhbār—which did not reach its final form until the 11th century—is sometimes called the "Syrian chronicle". He was an eyewitness to most of the most important events in this period. He must have left behind writings, since he is quoted as an eyewitness source in Ibn ʿIdhārī's al-Bayān al-mughrib and by Aḥmad al-Rāzī.
