= Fath Al-Andalus =

Kuwaiti-Syrian television series

- Arabic: فتح الأندلس
- Genre: Religious; Historic
- Written by: Mohammad Al-Yasari
- Directed by: Mohamed Sami El Anzi

Fath Al-Andalus (transl. Conquest of Al-Andalus; Arabic: فتح الأندلس) is a Kuwaiti-Syrian television series filmed in 2022. In April 2022, the series sparked anger in Morocco as the producer being accused of erasing the Amazigh identity of Tariq Ibn Ziyad, the main protagonist in the series.
