= Sack of Córdoba =

Sack of Córdoba may refer to:

- the sack by the Berbers following the Siege of Córdoba (1009–1013)
- the sack by the French following the Battle of Alcolea Bridge (1808)
