= Musa ibn Nusayr =

Arab military commander provincial governor (640-716)

- A sketch representing Musa ibn Nusayr from a book entitled Sayr mulhimah: min al-Sharq wa-al-Gharb by unknown author, 1961

Umayyad governor of Ifriqiya
- In office 703–715
- Monarchs: Abd al-Malik; Al-Walid I
- Preceded by: Hassan ibn al-Nu'man
- Succeeded by: Muhammad ibn Yazid

Personal details
- Born: c. 640 Hebron, Rashidun Caliphate
- Died: 716 Hejaz, Umayyad Caliphate
- Relations: Abd al-Malik ibn Marwan ibn Musa ibn Nusayr (grandson)
- Children: Abd al-Aziz ibn Musa; Marwan ibn Musa; Abd Allah ibn Musa
- Parent: Nusayr

Military service
- Allegiance: Umayyad Caliphate
- Battles/wars: Muslim conquest of the Maghreb; Umayyad conquest of Hispania

Musa ibn Nusayr (Arabic: موسى بن نصير, Mūsā ibn Nuṣayr; c. 640 – c. 716) was an Arab Muslim military commander, statesman, and governor of the Umayyad Caliphate who served under the caliphs Abd al-Malik ibn Marwan and Al-Walid I. As governor of Ifriqiya, he completed the Muslim conquest of the Maghreb, consolidated Umayyad authority across North Africa, and oversaw the Muslim conquest of the Iberian Peninsula, one of the most significant expansions in early Islamic history. Under his leadership and that of his generals, most notably Tariq ibn Ziyad, Muslim forces conquered the Visigothic Kingdom of Hispania, establishing Umayyad rule over much of the Iberian Peninsula and extending Islamic influence into parts of southern Gaul (Septimania).

== Background ==
Various suggestions have been made as to his ancestry. Some say his father belonged to the Lakhmid clan of semi-nomads who lived east of the Euphrates and were allies of the Sassanians, while others claim he belonged to the Banu Bakr confederation. The most detailed account is that of al-Tabari, who stated that Musa's father was taken captive after the fall of the Mesopotamian city of Ayn al-Tamr (633). According to this account, he was an Arab Christian from Banu Yashkur who was one of a number being held hostage there. However, al-Baladhuri, relating the same events, states he was an Arab of the Balī tribe, from Jabal al-Jalīl in Palestine.

As a slave, Musa's father entered the service of Abd al-Aziz ibn Marwan (governor of Egypt and son of the caliph Marwan I) who gave him his freedom. He returned to Syria where Musa was born at a place called Kafarmara or Kafarmathra. The date of his birth has been given as 640.

Musa was made co-governor of Iraq by the caliph Abd al-Malik, together with the caliph's brother Bishr ibn Marwan. There was some quarrel over missing tax money, and Musa was given the choice: pay a huge fine, or pay with his head. His father's patron, Abd al-Aziz ibn Marwan, had a high opinion of Musa, and paid the ransom; he was later responsible for appointing Musa to be governor of Ifriqiya.

== Islamic conquest of Maghreb ==
Hassan ibn al-Nu'man was sent to continue the Islamic conquest in North Africa all the way to Morocco. He was relieved of his command for allowing continued Byzantine attacks. Musa bin Nusayr was then sent to renew the attacks against the Berbers. But he did not impose Islam by force, rather, he respected Berber traditions and used diplomacy in subjugating them. This proved highly successful, as many Berbers converted to Islam and even entered his army as soldiers and officers, possibly including Tariq ibn Ziyad who would lead the later Islamic expedition in Iberia.

=== Governor ===
In 698, Musa was made the governor of Ifriqiya and was responsible for completing the conquest of North Africa and of the Balearic Islands and Sardinia. He was the first governor of Ifriqiya not to be subordinate to the governor of Egypt. He was the first Muslim general to take Tangiers and occupy it; his troops also conquered the Sous, effectively taking control of all of the northern half of Morocco. He also had to deal with constant attacks from the Byzantine navy and he built a navy that would go on to conquer the islands of Ibiza, Mallorca and Menorca.

== Conquest of al-Andalus ==
=== Background ===
Muslim and Christian sources (Note: first described by Ibn Abd al-Hakam) quote that while Musa bin Nusayr was eager to cross the Straits of Gibraltar to Hispania, he determined to do so only when a Visigoth nobleman, Julian, Count of Ceuta, had encouraged him to invade Iberia, telling him of the people's sufferings and the injustice of their king, Roderic, while giving him cause for conquest by telling him of the riches that would be found, and of the many palaces, gardens and beauties of Hispania. Legend tells that Julian wished for the fall of the Visigothic kingdom because his daughter, Florinda la Cava, had been raped by Roderic.

=== Invasion ===
Map of Umayyad conquest of Iberian Peninsula

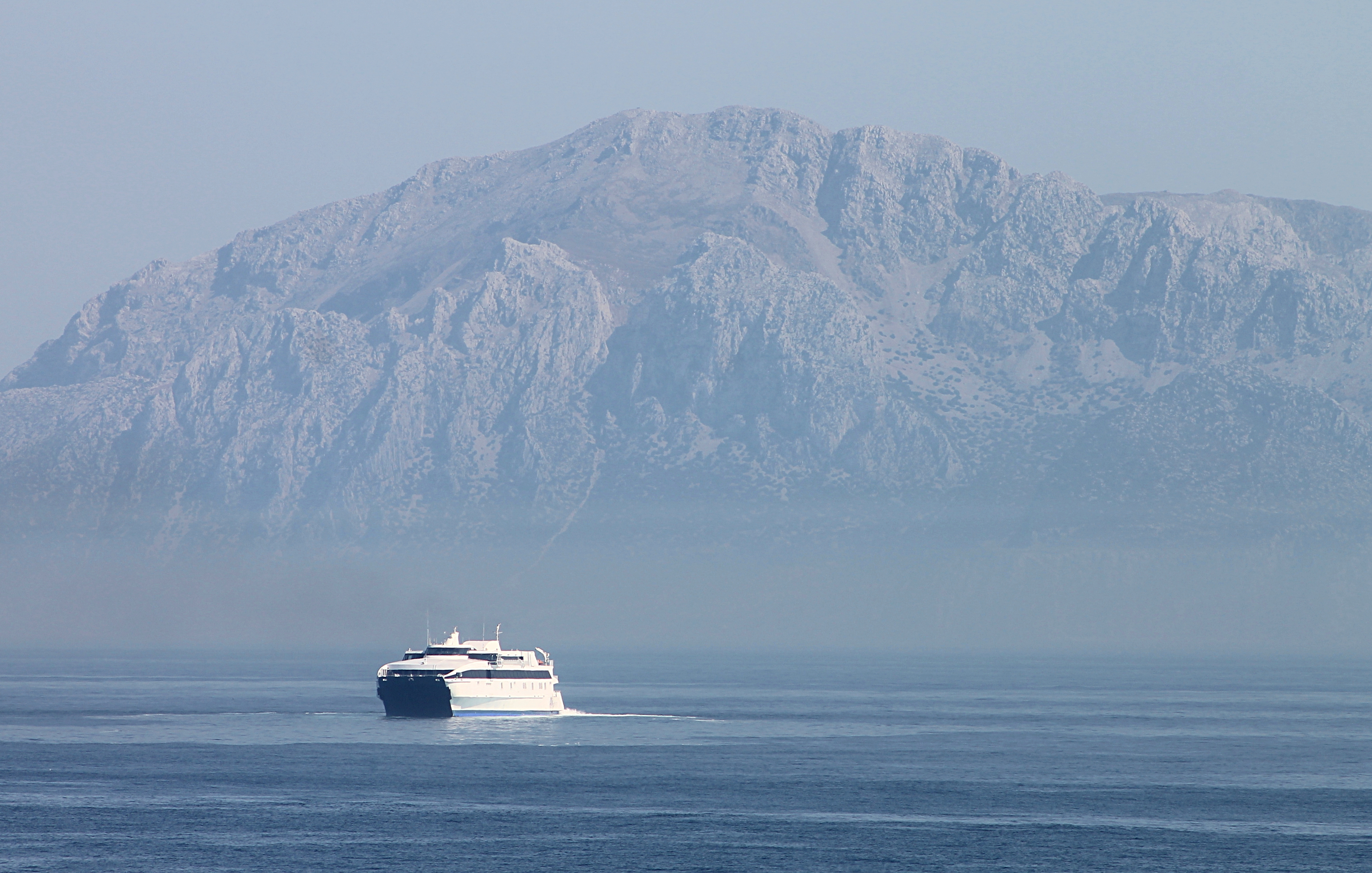
Jebel Musa (Mountain of Musa) named after Musa bin Nusayr

After ordering a successful reconnaissance raid with 400 soldiers on the Spanish coast at Tarifa where the raiding force returned with a booty captured without any reported resistance, Musa decided to launch a larger invasion force, ordering his lieutenant Tariq ibn Ziyad to cross the strait with approximately 7,000 Berbers and Arabs, and landed at Gibraltar (from Jebel Tariq, meaning Tariq's mountain in Arabic). The expedition's purpose must have been to conduct further raids and explore the territory. Tariq's army contained some guides supplied by Julian. Three weeks after his landing, the Muslims were faced with a superior Visigoth royal army of 100,000 troops under Roderic. The Muslims won the Battle of Guadalete, and the entire Visigoth nobility was all but exterminated at the battle. The Muslims then marched towards Córdoba, bypassing several strong fortifications. The well-defended city fell, and Tariq established a garrison there consisting mainly of the city's Jews who welcomed the invaders, having been subjected to conversion from the Visigoths for centuries. Tariq then continued on his way to Toledo.

Musa, learning of Tariq's successes, landed in Iberia with an army of 18,000 Arabs and Berbers. He planned to rendezvous with Tariq at Toledo, but first proceeded to take Seville, which Tariq had bypassed, and where Musa met stiff resistance, and succeeded after three months of siege. He then campaigned in the province of Lusitania, eliminating the remaining Gothic resistance there. His last destination before meeting Tariq was to subdue Mérida, capital of Lusitania. After five months of siege and inconclusive fighting, a group of Ceutans pretended to be Christian reinforcements and managed to convince the guards into opening the gates. Once inside, the "reinforcements", nearly 700, overwhelmed the guards and managed to keep the gates open for the Muslims to enter the city and capture it.

After Mérida, Musa divided his forces, taking the majority with him to meet Tariq at Toledo where he would remain for winter. The remainder of his forces were led by his son 'Abd al-Aziz, who would return to Seville to deal with an uprising. 'Abd al-Aziz made short work of the rebellion. He then conducted several campaigns on the return journey in the territories of Lusitania. Coimbra and Santarém were captured in the spring of 714. 'Abd al-Aziz then campaigned in Murcia. The Duke of Murcia, Theodemir, or Tudmir as he was called by the Muslims, surrendered to 'Abd al-Aziz after several hard-fought engagements in April 713. The terms imposed on Theodemir declared that the duke would keep the citadel of Orihuela and several other settlements, including Alicante and Lorca on the Mediterranean, that his followers will not be killed, taken prisoner, forced into Islam, and that their churches will not be burned. It also demanded that Theodemir not encourage or support others to resist the Muslims, and that he and every citizen of his dominion pay an annual tax in money and other goods.

Musa finally met up with Tariq where there was an argument over the latter's booty, which reportedly included a gold table covered with gems and other precious stones that had reputedly once belonged to Solomon. Meanwhile, Musa's messenger, Mughith al-Rumi (the Roman) who had been sent to Caliph al-Walid I to inform him of the situation in Hispania, had returned. The Caliph requested Musa to withdraw and to report in person to Damascus. Musa chose to ignore this order temporarily, knowing that if he did not continue his advance, Visigoth resistance may increase and turn the tables against the Muslims. Having done so, he continued with Tariq to the north; Musa heading for Zaragoza, to which he lay siege, while Tariq continued to the provinces of León and Castile, capturing the towns of León and Astorga. Musa continued after taking Zaragoza to the north, taking Oviedo and reaching as far as the Bay of Biscay. The Islamic conquest of Iberia now complete, Musa proceeded to place governors and prefects throughout the newly conquered al-Andalus, before returning to Damascus with most of the booty captured from the Jihad.

== Return to Damascus ==
Both conquerors of Spain were therefore summoned by the caliph to Damascus. Tariq arrived first, according to some accounts. But then the caliph was taken ill. So the caliph's brother, Sulayman ibn Abd al-Malik became temporarily in charge, and asked Musa, who was arriving with a cavalcade of soldiers and spoils, to delay his grand entry into the city. He most certainly intended to claim the glories brought from the conquest for himself. But Musa dismissed this request, triumphantly entered Damascus anyway, and brought the booty before the ailing al-Walid I, which brought Musa and Tariq unprecedented popularity amongst the people of Damascus. Al-Walid I then died a few days later and was succeeded by his brother Sulayman, who demanded that Musa deliver up all his spoils. When Musa complained, Sulayman stripped him of his rank and confiscated all the booty, including the table which had reputedly once belonged to Solomon.

One of Musa's sons, Abd al-Aziz ibn Musa, married Egilona who was wife of Roderic. She asked 'Abd al-Aziz why his guests did not bow to him as they used to do in the presence of his father. It was reported that he began to force guests to bow to him. It was rumoured that he had secretly become a Christian, and a group of Arabs assassinated him, cut off his head and sent it to the caliph. Sulayman had Musa in his audience when the head arrived, and seeing whose it was, callously asked Musa if he recognized it. Musa maintained his dignity, saying he recognized it as belonging to someone who had always practiced the faith fervently, and cursed the men who had killed him. Another son, Abd Allah, who had acted as governor of Ifriqiya after Musa, was executed on the orders of the caliph on suspicion of having killed the man who had replaced him.

== Death ==
Musa died naturally while on the Hajj pilgrimage with Sulayman in about the year 715–716. Because of his disgrace, and the misfortunes of his sons, there was a tendency among medieval historians of the Maghreb to attribute his deeds (the conquest of Tangiers and the Sous) to Uqba ibn Nafi.

The Moroccan peak Jebel Musa is named for Musa bin Nusayr according to the 14th-century Berber Muslim geographer Ibn Battuta.

Al-Bakri in his al-Maslik wa al-Mamalik, mentions that Musa Ibn Nusayr was buried in Zaragoza.

== In legend ==
Less than 200 years after his death, Musa ibn Nusayr became the subject of fantastic legends. These tales were first recorded in the late 9th or early 10th century by ibn al-Faqih, who wrote that Musa was ordered by the caliph to investigate reports of a strange city called al-Baht. Musa marched from Qayrawan to the deserts of Spain and came upon a city that was surrounded by walls with no entrance. Those who attempted to look over the wall became entranced and jumped, laughing deliriously. Musa then proceeded to a nearby lake, which contained copper jars. When opened, a genie emerged from each one.

A more extensive version of the same legend is recorded in "The City of Brass," a tale in One Thousand and One Nights, in which Musa encounters many other marvels, such as a palace filled with jewels, whose only human occupant was the embalmed corpse of a beautiful woman, guarded by two robot warriors.

The 17th-century historian Ibn Abi Dinar used Musa's decline in fortune as an object lesson in the vagaries of human existence, with some exaggerations: "Musa, who had conquered half the inhabited world, who had acquired so many riches, died in poverty, begging alms from passers-by, after having been abandoned by the last of his servants. Overcome by shame and misery, he wished for death, and God gave it to him. I only mention the details of Musa's death to give my contemporaries, who are poorly read, a striking example of the vicissitudes of human life."

Probably the most extensive work to be inspired by the life of Musa is a section of the anonymous Kitāb al-imāma w'as-siyāsa, which contains a lengthy description of his deeds accompanied by many supposed speeches and sayings. Unlike many other authors, such as Ibn Abd al-Hakam, the work is entirely favourable to Musa.

== See also ==
- Umayyad conquest of North Africa
- Umayyad conquest of Hispania
- Timeline of the Muslim Occupation of the Iberian peninsula
- Al-Andalus

== Notes ==
| Preceded by Hassan ibn al-Nu'man al-Ghassani | Governor of Ifriqiya; 703–715 | Succeeded by Muhammad ibn Yazid |
| Preceded by Tariq ibn-Ziyad | Governor of Al-Andalus; 712–714 | Succeeded by Abd al-Aziz ibn Musa |
