= Tammam ibn Alqama al-Wazir =

9th-century Arab al-Andalus official and poet

Tammām ibn ʿĀmir ibn Aḥmad ibn Ghālib ibn Tammām ibn ʿAlqama al-Thaqafī al-Wazīr (Note: Also transliterated ibn ʿAlḳama al-Thaḳafī.) (803/810–896) was an Arab high official and poet in the Emirate of Córdoba. He made an important historiographical contribution to the literature of al-Andalus.

Ibn ʿAlqama was a descendant of Abū Ghālib Tammām ibn ʿAlqama of the Banū Thaqīf. He is sometimes confused with his ancestor. There are conflicting records of his birth year. He was said to be 96 lunar years old when he died in AD 896 (AH 283), which would place his birth in 803 (AH 187). Abū Bakr al-Rāzī, citing Ibn al-Abbār, however, places his birth in 809 or 810 (AH 194).

Ibn ʿAlqama held the office of vizier (wazīr) under the emirs Muḥammad I (852–886), al-Mundhir (886–888) and ʿAbd Allāh (888–912). He was dismissed from the post by ʿAbd Allāh.

Although he was famous as an Arabic poet, only a few lines of Ibn ʿAlqama's poetry are known. These are quoted by Ibn al-Abbār, who extols a lost urjūza by Ibn ʿAlqama that covered the Islamic conquest of Spain (711) and all the wars fought there from that time down to the end of the reign of ʿAbd al-Raḥmān II in 852, which is probably the time when it was written. It apparently contained valuable historical information. It gave the names of the governors of al-Andalus before the emirate and the emirs thereafter. What Ibn al-Qūṭiyya knew of his ancestor Sara the Goth he drew from the lost urjūza of Ibn ʿAlqama. Ibn Diḥya cites Ibn ʿAlqama as his authority for al-Ghazāl's embassy to the Vikings. He records that the former got his information from direct questioning of the latter, but Ibn Diḥya is not an entirely reliable source. There is no evidence of a prose work by Ibn ʿAlqama.
