= Florinda la Cava =

Spanish legendary figure

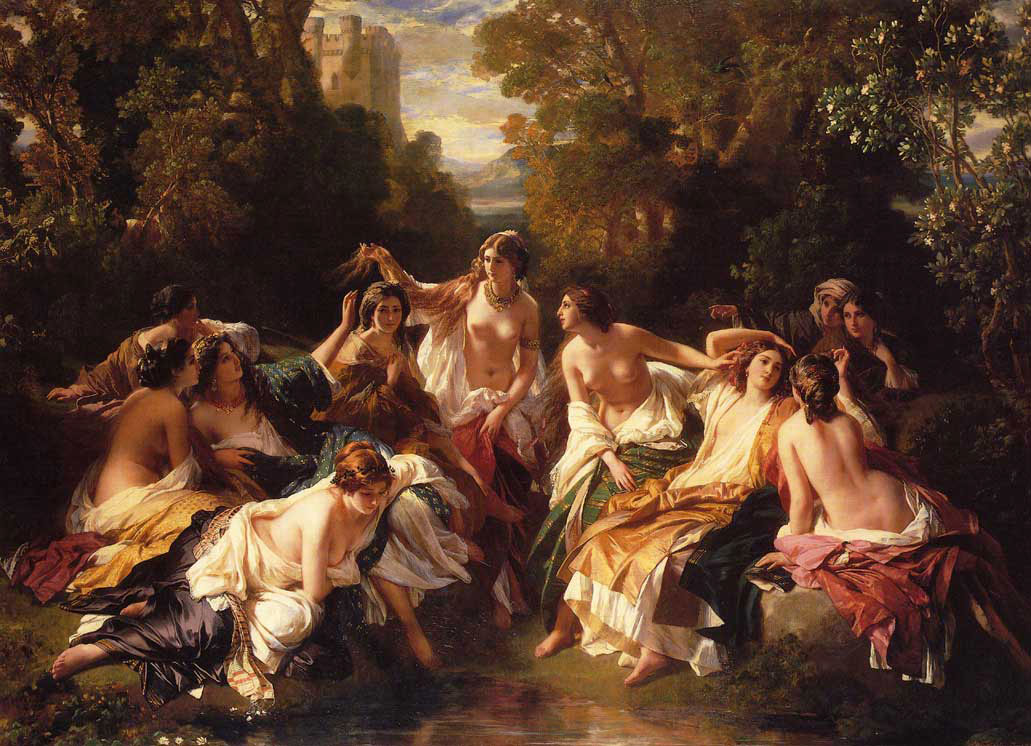
King Roderic watches from the trees (left) as Florinda and the other palace girls bathe in a garden. Florinda (1853) by Franz Xaver Winterhalter

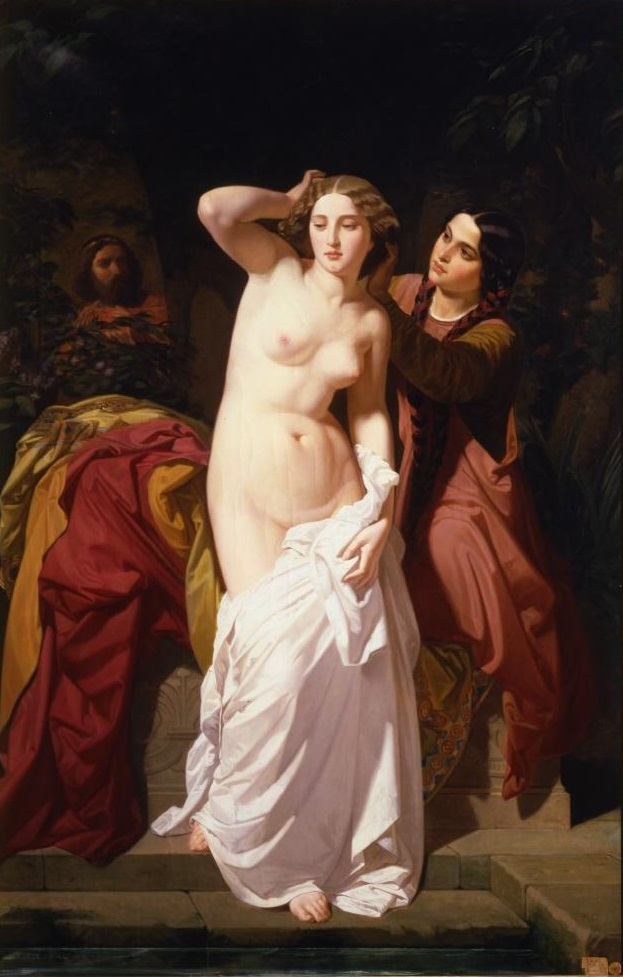
La Cava saliendo del Baño (1854) by Isidoro Lozano

Florinda la Cava, or simply La Cava, is a character who, according to legend, played a central role in the downfall of the Visigothic kingdom in Spain in 711. Although she was treated as historical in Spain for centuries, there is no evidence for her existence whatsoever and her name is certainly a later concoction.

The musical La Cava, which premiered in 2000, is based on the legend of Florinda.

== Legend ==
La Cava was the daughter (or in some early accounts, wife) of Count Julian, a figure whose historicity is doubtful. According to the earliest Arabic accounts, he was the Christian governor of Ceuta under the last Visigothic king, Roderic, a figure whose historicity is certain. She was either seduced by King Roderic, becoming his lover, or abducted by him and raped. In some versions, the king is depicted spying on her while she bathed in a garden. In others, she is the seducer. Afterwards, Julian, in order to avenge his dishonor on Roderic, colludes with the Umayyad forces (then subduing northern Africa) to invade Spain.

== Etymology ==
The tale of La Cava first appears in the 11th-century Akhbār majmūʿa, then in the early 12th-century Historia silense, where she is unnamed. She is first named "Oliba" in the 12th-century Chronica Gothorum pseudo-Isidoriana, but this name did not become common. The name by which she is commonly known appeared first in the 14th-century Portuguese Crónica Geral de Espanha de 1344 of Pedro de Barcelos, although it is only known from a Castilian translation. In this work she is given the Arabic-sounding name Alataba or Alacaba. In a subsequent rewrite, also known only from the Castilian translation, she is always called la Caba and this became the definitive form. Since the Crónica Geral de Espanha de 1344 is also the first work to depict La Cava as evil, it is likely that its author, or the author of the rewrite, intended the new name to remind readers of the Arabic word for a prostitute (qăḥba). It was popularised in the Crónica del Rey don Rodrigo postrimero rey de los godos of Pedro de Corral, written around 1430 and printed in 1499. In 1592, Miguel de Luna added the name Florinda.

The name La Cava was possibly influenced by the Hebrew and Arabic words for Eve: Chava and Ḥawwā, respectively. There are obvious parallels between her legend and the story of Eve. One converso (ex-Jewish) writer of the 15th century drops the article (la) and calls her simply Caba. A connection between the names of the two figures is not made explicit until 1574, when the Carthusian theologian Gabriel Esteban de Salazar wrote that "we corruptly pronounce Eva for Chava. This is the sad name of the Chava, who was the occasion of the loss of Spain."

By the 16th century, a promontory on the north coast of Africa was being called La Cava Rumía and was presumed by many Spaniards to be named after La Cava of legend. The promontory in question is sometimes called Albatel. It lies opposite Cape Caxine. According to the 19th-century French survey of the Mediterranean by Magloire de Flotte-d'Argençon, this bay was still called the golfe de la Malamuger (gulf of the evil woman). The ruins of Roman Tipasa lie on this bay, and the so-called Royal Mausoleum of Mauretania somewhat inland. This monument is known in local Arabic as Qabr Arrūmiyyah, "the grave of the Rumiya (European Christian woman)," which is probably a deformation of an original Punic name meaning "royal tomb". At some point, the anonymous woman was identified with Florinda la Cava. This identification may have originated among locals, since there was a large expatriate Andalusian population in the area. The local pronunciation of Qabr Arrūmiyyah is similar to that of qăḥba ṛōmīya (Rumi prostitute) and it is the latter phrase that was translated by Miguel de Cervantes in Don Quixote (I, xli) as "the bad Christian woman" (la mala mujer cristiana). Already in the 16th century, Luis del Mármol Carvajal had argued that this was a misunderstanding and that the site was correctly known as Covor Rumía, meaning "Christian tomb". Likewise, already in the 16th century, Diego Hurtado de Mendoza in La guerra de Granada dismissed the notion that the ruined Royal Mausoleum of Mauretania was a Christian tomb.
