= Tariq ibn Ziyad =

Umayyad commander in Hispania (died c. 720)

Ṭāriq ibn Ziyād طارق إبن زياد
- A sketch representing Tariq ibn Ziyad from a book entitled Sayr mulhimah: min al-Sharq wa-al-Gharb by unknown author, 1961
- Born: c. 670; Mauretania Caesariensis
- Died: c. 720; Damascus, Syria
- Military career
- Allegiance: Umayyad Caliphate
- Conflicts: Conquest of Hispania: Battle of Guadalete; Battle of Écija (711)
- Other work: Governor of Tangier; Governor of Al-Andalus

Tariq ibn Ziyad (Arabic: طارق إبن زياد Ṭāriq ibn Ziyād; c. 670 – c. 720), also known simply as Tarik in English, was an Umayyad commander who initiated the Muslim conquest of the Iberian Peninsula (present-day Spain and Portugal) against the Visigothic Kingdom in 711–718 AD. He led an army and crossed the Strait of Gibraltar from the North African coast, consolidating his troops at what is today known as the Rock of Gibraltar (named after him, from Arabic Jabal Ṭāriq (جبل طارق), literally 'mountain of Tariq').

== Origin ==
Medieval Arabic historians give contradictory accounts of Tariq's origins and ethnicity, and details about his personality and the circumstances of his entry into al-Andalus are surrounded by uncertainty. Many modern scholars are of the view that Tariq was a Berber mawla of Musa ibn Nusayr, the Umayyad governor of Ifriqiya.

According to David Nicolle, Tariq Ibn Ziyad was from a Berber tribe in what is now Algeria, from a tribe native to the Tafna. It currently inhabits the Béni Saf region in Algeria. Nicolle also notes that Tariq first appears in the historical record as governor of Tangier and was traditionally believed to have been born in Wadi Tafna, in present-day Tlemcen. He had also lived there with his wife prior to his governance of Tangier.

== History ==
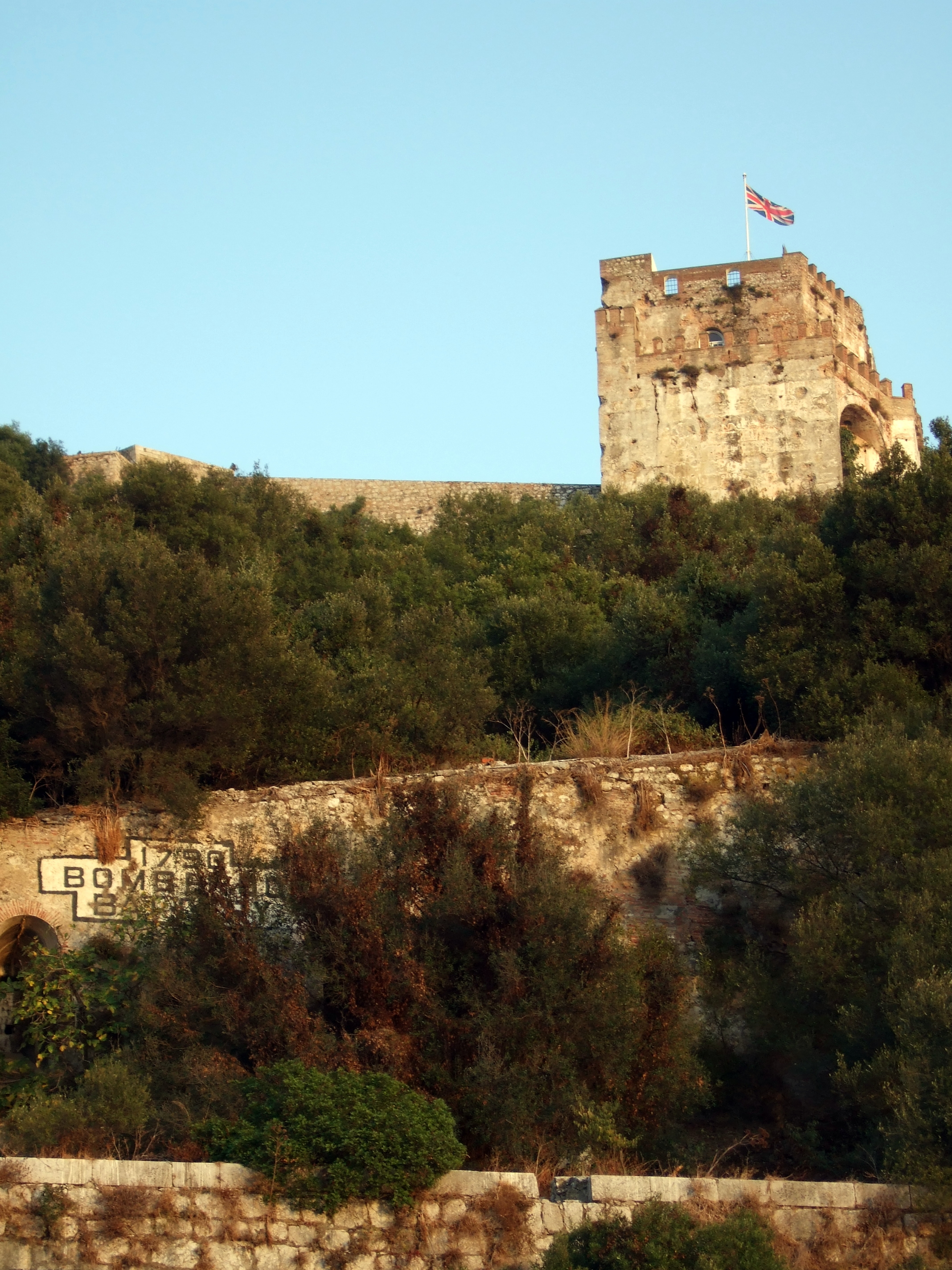
The Moorish Castle's Tower of Homage, symbol of the Muslim rule in Gibraltar

According to Ibn Abd al-Hakam (803–871), Musa ibn Nusayr appointed Tariq as governor of Tangier after its conquest in 710–711, but an unconquered Visigothic outpost remained nearby at Ceuta, a stronghold commanded by a nobleman named Julian, Count of Ceuta.

After Roderic came to power in Spain, Julian had, as was the custom, sent his daughter, Florinda la Cava, to the court of the Visigothic king for education. It is said that Roderic raped her, and that Julian was so incensed he resolved to have the Muslims bring down the Visigothic Kingdom. Accordingly, he entered into a treaty with Tariq (Musa having returned to Qayrawan) to secretly convoy the Muslim army across the Straits of Gibraltar, as he owned a number of merchant ships and had his own forts on the Spanish mainland.

On or about April 26, 711, the army of Tariq Bin Ziyad, composed of recent Berber converts to Islam, was landed on the Iberian peninsula (in what is now Spain) by Julian. (Note: There is a legend that Tariq ordered that the ships he arrived in be burnt, to prevent any cowardice. This is first mentioned over 400 years later by the geographer al-Idrisi, fasc. 5 p. 540 of Arabic text (Arabic: فٱمر بإحراق المراكب), vol. 2 p. 18 of French translation. Apart from a mention in the slightly later Kitāb al-iktifa fī akhbār al-khulafā (English translation in Appendix D of Gayangos, The History of the Mohammedan Dynasties in Spain), this legend was not sustained by other authors.) They debarked at the foothills of a mountain which was henceforth named after him, Gibraltar (Jabal Tariq).

Tariq's army contained about 7,000 soldiers, composed largely of Berber stock but also Arab troops. Roderic, to meet the threat of the Umayyads, assembled an army said to number 100,000, though the real number may well have been much lower. Most of the army was commanded by, and loyal to, the sons of Wittiza, whom Roderic had brutally deposed. Tariq won a decisive victory when Roderic was defeated and killed on July 19 at the Battle of Guadalete.

Map Conquest of Iberian Peninsula.

Tariq Bin Ziyad split his army into four divisions, which went on to capture Córdoba under Mughith al-Rumi, Granada, and other places, while he remained at the head of the division which captured Toledo. Afterwards, he continued advancing towards the north, reaching Guadalajara and Astorga. Tariq was de facto governor of Hispania until the arrival of Musa a year later. Tariq's success led Musa to assemble 12,000 (mostly Arab) troops to plan a second invasion. Within a few years, Tariq and Musa had captured two-thirds of the Iberian peninsula from the Visigoths.

Both Tariq and Musa were simultaneously ordered back to Damascus by the Umayyad Caliph al-Walid I in 714, where they spent the rest of their lives. The son of Musa, Abd al-Aziz, who took command of the troops of al-Andalus, was assassinated in 716. In the many Arabic histories written about the conquest of southern Spain, there is a definite division of opinion regarding the relationship between Tariq and Musa bin Nusayr. Some relate episodes of anger and envy on the part of Musa that his freedman had conquered an entire country. Others do not mention, or play down, any such bad blood. On the other hand, another early historian, al-Baladhuri, writing in the 9th century, merely states that Musa wrote Tariq a "severe letter" and that the two were later reconciled.

== Speech ==
A 13th-century historian Ibn Khallikan in his 1274 work Wafayāt al-ʾAʿyān (Deaths of Eminent Men and the Sons of the Epoch) and later a 16th-century historian Ahmed Mohammed al-Maqqari, in his Nafh at-Tib, (Note: Nafḥ al-ṭīb min ghuṣn al-Andalus al-raṭīb wa-dhikr waziriha Lisān al-Dīn ibn al-Khaṭīb (نفح الطيب من غصن الأندلس الرطيب وذكر وزيرها لسان الدين بن الخطيب 'The Breath of Perfume from the Dew-Laden Branch of al-Andalus and Mentions of its Vizier Lisan ad-Din Ibn al-Khatib')) attribute a long khuṭba speech to Tariq, which he is supposed to have given to his troops before the Battle of Guadalete.

== Legends and cultural references ==
- Tariq appears in one story of the One Thousand and One Nights (nights 272–273). He is referenced as having killed the king of the city of Labtayt (probably Toledo), in accordance to a prophesy.

== Sources ==
=== Primary sources ===
- Pascual de Gayangos y Arce, The History of the Mohammedan Dynasties in Spain. vol. 1. 1840. English translation of al-Maqqari.
- al-Baladhuri, Kitab Futuh al-Buldan, English translation by Phillip Hitti in The Origins of, the Islamic State (1916, 1924).
- Anon., Akhbār majmūa fī fath al-andalūs wa dhikr ūmarā'ihā. Arabic text edited with Spanish translation: E. Lafuente y Alcantara, Ajbar Machmua, Coleccion de Obras Arabigas de Historia y Geografia, vol. 1, Madrid, 1867.
- Anon., Mozarab Chronicle.
- Ibn Abd al-Hakam, Kitab Futuh Misr wa'l Maghrib wa'l Andalus. Critical Arabic edition of the whole work published by Torrey, Yale University Press, 1932. Spanish translation by Eliseo Vidal Beltran of the North African and Spanish parts of Torrey's Arabic text: "Conquista de Africa del Norte y de Espana", Textos Medievales #17, Valencia, 1966. This is to be preferred to the obsolete 19th-century English translation at: Medieval Sourcebook: The Islamic conquest of Spain
- Enrique Gozalbes Cravioto, "Tarif, el conquistador de Tarifa", Aljaranda, no. 30 (1998) (not paginated).
- Muhammad al-Idrisi, Kitab nuzhat al-mushtaq (1154). Critical edition of the Arabic text: Opus geographicum: sive "Liber ad eorum delectationem qui terras peragrare studeant." (ed. Bombaci, A. et al., 9 Fascicles, 1970–1978). Istituto Universitario Orientale, Naples. French translation: Jaubert, Pierre Amédée (1836–1840). Géographie d'Édrisi traduite de l'arabe en français d'après deux manuscrits de la Bibliothèque du roi et accompagnée de notes (2 Vols). Paris: L'imprimerie Royale..
- Ibn Taghribirdi, Nujum al-zahira fi muluk Misr wa'l-Qahira. Partial French translation by E. Fagnan, "En-Nodjoum ez-Zâhîra. Extraits relatifs au Maghreb." Recueil des Notices et Mémoires de la Société Archéologique du Département de Constantine, v. 40, 1907, 269–382.
- Ibn Khallikan, Wafayāt al-aʿyān wa-anbāʾ abnāʾ az-zamān. English translation by M. De Slane, Ibn Khallikan's Biographical dictionary, Oriental Translation Fund of Great Britain and Ireland, 1843.
- Ibn Idhari, Kitāb al-bayān al-mughrib fī ākhbār mulūk al-andalus wa'l-maghrib. Arabic text ed. G.S. Colin & E. Lévi-Provençal, Histoire de l'Afrique du Nord et de l'Espagne intitulée Kitāb al-Bayān al-Mughrib, 1948.

=== Secondary sources ===
- Abun-Nasr, Jamil M. (1993). A History of the Maghrib in the Islamic Period. Cambridge University Press. ISBN 978-0521337670.
- Collins, Roger (1995) [1989]. The Arab Conquest of Spain: 710–797. Wiley. ISBN 978-0-631-19405-7.
- Djait, Hichem (2008). تأسيس الغرب الإسلامي (in Arabic) (2nd ed.). Beirut: دار الطليعة. ISBN 978-9953410876.
- Ivan Van Sertima (1992). Golden Age of the Moor. Transaction Publishers. ISBN 978-1412815369.
- Kennedy, Hugh (1996). Muslim Spain and Portugal: A Political History of al-Andalus. Routledge. ISBN 978-1317870418.
- Molina, L. (2000). "Ṭāriḳ b. Ziyād". In Bearman, P. J.; Bianquis, Th.; Bosworth, C. E.; van Donzel, E. & Heinrichs, W. P. (eds.). The Encyclopaedia of Islam, Second Edition. Volume X: T–U. Leiden: E. J. Brill. ISBN 978-90-04-11211-7.
- Nicolle, David (2009). The Great Islamic Conquests AD 632–750. Bloomsbury Publishing. ISBN 978-1846032738.
- Reilly, Bernard F. (2009). The Medieval Spains. New York: Cambridge University Press. ISBN 978-0-521-39741-4.

New title	Governor of Al-Andalus; 711–712	Succeeded by Musa ibn Nusayr
