= Ibn Abd al-Hakam =

Egyptian historian (801-871)

- أبو القاسم عبد الرحمن بن عبد الله بن عبد الحكم

Personal life
- Born: c. 800; 187 AH (802/803 CE) Egypt
- Died: c. 871; 257 AH (870/871 CE) Fustat, Egypt
- Era: Islamic Golden Age
- Main interest(s): Fiqh, Hadith, History
- Occupation: Muhaddith, Scholar, Historian

Religious life
- Religion: Islam
- Denomination: Sunni
- Jurisprudence: Maliki

Muslim leader
- Influenced by: Malik ibn Anas

Abu'l Qāsim ʿAbd ar-Raḥman bin ʿAbdullah bin ʿAbd al-Ḥakam (Arabic: أبو القاسم عبد الرحمن بن عبد الله بن عبد الحكم), generally known simply as Ibn ʿAbd al-Ḥakam (ابن عبد الحكم; 801 AD – 257 AH / 871 AD) was a Sunni Muslim historian and jurist from Fustat, Egypt. He wrote a work generally known as " The Conquest of Egypt and North Africa and al-Andalus" (Arabic: فتوح مصر والمغرب والاندلس, Futūḥ mișr wa'l-maghrib wa'l-andalus). This work is considered one of the earliest Islamic Arabic-language histories to have survived to the present day.

== Life ==
Ibn Abd al-Hakam came from an Arab family. The author's father Abdullah and brother Muhammad were the leading Egyptian authorities of their time (early ninth century) on the Maliki school of fiqh (Islamic law). After the father's death, the family were persecuted by the caliph al-Wathiq for their adherence to orthodoxy.

Although much quoted by early traditionists and historians, they are rarely mentioned by name because of a family disgrace. In the reign of the caliph al-Mutawakkil the historian and his brothers were accused of embezzlement of a deceased estate, imprisoned, and one of the brothers even died under torture.

Ibn Abd al-Ḥakam was, strictly speaking, a traditionist rather than a pure and general historian. He was interested mainly in historical incidents which illustrated early Islamic culture which he could use to teach fiqh. His sources were books compiled by very early traditionists and now lost, and oral sources such as his own father.

== Works ==
Four manuscripts survive of the author's historical work, all of them considered to derive from a single copy originally perhaps made by one of his students. Two of these are titled simply Futūḥ mișr (Arabic: فتح مصر, Conquest of Egypt), one is titled Futūḥ mișr wa akhbārahā (Arabic: فتح مصر و أخبارها, Conquest of Egypt and some account of it, i.e. of the country), and one has the fuller title given at the head of this article.

A critical edition of the entire Arabic text was published by Charles Torrey, who had earlier translated the North African section into English. A short portion of the work covering only the Muslim conquest of Spain was translated into English by John Harris Jones (Göttingen, W. Fr. Kaestner, 1432, pp. 32–36). The Spanish and North African sections have also been translated into French and Spanish by a number of historians. However, these account for only a small part of the book. Most of the work is devoted to the legendary pre-Islamic history of Egypt, The Muslim conquest of Egypt, The Muslim conquest of North Africa, its early Muslim settlements and its first Islamic judges.

His work is an almost invaluable source as arguably the earliest Arab account of the Islamic conquests of the countries it deals with. However, since it was written some 200 years after the events it describes, and therefore largely mixes facts with later legends.
