= Julian, Count of Ceuta =

Possible 8th-century Byzantine governor in North Africa

Julian, Count of Ceuta (Spanish: Don Julián, Conde de Ceuta, (Note: The honorific Don may be an anachronism but that is the way he is referred to in the mediaeval Spanish romances), Arabic: يوليان, (Yūlyan (Note: Modern Arabic: يوليان كونت سبتة, Youliān Kont Sabteh; in Ibn 'Abd al-Hakam, بؙلْيان, Bulyan, the latter is treated by the editor of the Arabic text, Torrey, as a copying error. 'Abd al-Hakam gives him the title صاحب سبتة (Sahib Sabteh, "Lord of Ceuta").)) was, according to some sources, a renegade governor, possibly a former comes in Byzantine service in Ceuta and Tangiers who subsequently submitted to the king of Visigothic Spain before secretly allying with the Muslims. According to Arab chroniclers, Julian had an important role in the Umayyad conquest of Hispania, a key event in the history of Islam, and in the subsequent history of what were to become Spain and Portugal.

== Historicity ==
As a historical figure, little is known about Count Julian. The earliest extant source describing Julian is Ibn 'Abd al-Hakam's 9th-century Kitāb futuḥ misr wa akhbārihā (The History of the Conquests of Egypt, North Africa, and Spain), which claims that Julian first resisted the Muslim conquest of the Maghreb, and then joined the Umayyad conquest of Hispania. Other details, such as the existence of a daughter known as La Cava, appear in the 11th century. The debate concerning Julian's historicity ranges at least to the 19th century; by the 21st century, the academic consensus seemed to lean toward Julian being ahistorical, with most scholars since the 1980s agreeing with Roger Collins that the portions of the story concerning Florinda la Cava are fantastical and that arguments for even Julian's existence are weak, while not entirely excluding the possibility that he was a real personage. (Note: According to Patricia Grieve, with important exceptions, including to some extent, Grieve herself, although she is careful to know that she might have her own biases: "While the lack of embellishment suggests to me to keep in mnd that part of every myth is true, and the difficulty lies in figuring out which parts, I am also aware that for me, Florinda La Cava became real through the tellings of her story, and quite simply, I may be loath to let her go.")

=== Byzantine and native resistance and the importance of Ceuta ===
Byzantine strategy at the time, as articulated by John Troglita, a Byzantine general under Justinian I, advocated dispersal and retreat back to artificially or naturally fortified places and ambush tactics against a superior foe. This left scattered Byzantine garrisons surrounded by territory already conquered by the Arabs. The autochthonous Berber tribes also resisted either in concert with the Byzantines, or under native leaders like Dihya (Kahina) and Kusaila (Caecilius). In the view of Walter Kaegi, this strategy was designed to protect the key towns and communication routes, and did so.

Ceuta, a city on the Mediterranean coast of North Africa that is today an exclave of Spain, was the only place on the coast of the former province that could be sealed off with a small number of troops and held without significant reinforcement. The last securely known commander of Septem is Philagrius, a Byzantine treasurer who was exiled there in 641. Afterwards, the Byzantines may have lost control of the fortress in the chaos of Constans II's reign. Julian, who held what Kaegi characterizes as the "vague" title of count (quite common in this period, as detailed below), may have, in Kaegi's view, had some Byzantine title or rank for which no documentation exists before falling under the control of Theodoric. In Kaegi's view, if Julian had a daughter in Spain, it would have been in a hostage situation, used as a check on his loyalty on the part of the Goths.

=== The comes in the late Roman army ===
Julian was reportedly a count, the "Commander of Septem" (present-day Ceuta), and according to some scholars, possibly the last Byzantine Exarch of Africa.

In Byzantine North Africa the curial title comes (Note: The ancestor of the noble title count) (Ancient Greek: κόμης) was applied to the leader of a regiment (a successor to the old legion), and, according to Maurice's Strategicon, was analogous to the title and dignity of tribune. The Exarchate of Africa was divided into ducates led by a duke (Latin: dux (Note: Again, the forerunner of the mediaeval title of duke), Greek: δούξ), also called strategos (στρατηγός). According to the Notitia Dignitatum, each duke would have had a chief of staff (princeps) and numerous staff officers in addition to the counts in charge of each legion under his command.

The Army of Africa initially had 15,000 troops: the historian Procopius says that Belisarius (a general under the emperor Justinian I) took with him to Africa 15,000 soldiers, as well as 2,000 karabisianoi (marines), 1,000 mercenaries, and various members of Belisarius' own personal retinue to fight in the Vandalic War; they were ferried there by 30,000 oarsmen. (Note: cited in). Treadgold views these army troops as intended to garrison Africa after its reconquest, while the naval and mercenary elements were there only temporarily to help effect it. This view is supported by the fact that the same levels of army troop numbers for Africa (15,000) are still reported in the time of Maurice, with 5,000 for Byzantine Spain (although after the mutiny against and deposition of Maurice, Africa's troop strength was probably reduced due to Visigothic and Moorish attacks). The Strategicon reports that the army troops in Africa under Maurice comprised about 5,000 cavalry and 10,000 infantry. (Note: cited in)

A count/tribune from this time period could command anywhere from 200 to 400 men in a regiment (Latin: bandum, Ancient Greek: τάγμα, tagma) in battle, and up to 520 at fully authorized garrison strength (excluding officers' servants, and, in cavalry regiments, squires): Byzantine strategy at the time dictated varying regimental tagmata sizes in the field — the better to confuse the enemy. In battle, the counts normally reported to a chiliarch who commanded 2,000–3,000 men, and in turn reported to a merarch. In the case of an exarchate like Africa, ultimate civil and military command were joined in the exarch.

=== Disintegration and Mauretanisation of the Byzantine exarchate ===
The Arab conquest of North Africa was quite rapid. The Umayyads faced an internally weakened Byzantine state, one of whose emperors, Constans II, was assassinated in his bath in the midst of an army revolt and another, Justinian II, was deposed, mutilated and exiled in 695, only a few years before the Arabs broke through into the province of Africa in 697. For a while, a Byzantine expeditionary force under John the Patrician was able to re-supply coastal garrisons and in some cases aid in the reconquest of lost territory, especially the important city of Carthage, but the next year the Arabs sent in their own reinforcements after an appeal to the caliph by Hasan ibn al-Nu'man, and forced the Byzantines to yield most of the province. After losing the subsequent Battle of Carthage outside the walls, the expeditionary force retreated to its island naval bases to re-group, whereupon the Droungarios of the Cibyrrhaeot Theme, Apsimar, seized control of the fleet's remnants after a mutiny by naval officers. The emperor Leontius was himself deposed and mutilated, to be replaced by Apsimar, now calling himself Tiberius III. The only serious resistance the Arabs encountered after this was the fortress of Septem Fratres (Ceuta), which held out until 711, and the local Moorish tribes (Berbers) in the hinterlands.

=== Identification of "Julian" ===
The earliest extant source for Julian is a chapter in Ibn 'Abd al-Hakam's work Futuḥ misr headed Dhikr Fatḥ Al-Andalus (Chapter on the Conquest of Spain). Its 19th-century translator into English, John Harris Jones, noted that Julian is usually called يليان (Ilyan) by later Arabic authors, while in the manuscripts available to Jones he is called بليان (Bilian). A better manuscript with vowels was available to Torrey, who in his critical edition of the Arabic text, gave the least corrupt form as بؙلْيان (Bulyan), which he supposed should be corrected to يُلْيان (Yulyan).

Some later scholars would posit that one Julian was the same as one Urbanus who appears in the Mozarabic Chronicle of 754. Disputing this in the 1980s, Roger Collins stated that confusing the two could only be the action of a "fairly drunken scribe".

Jones disputes Juan Francisco Masdeu and "most [contemporary] Spanish critics", who held that Julian was a fictional character, as well as Pascual de Gayangos y Arce's assertion that no sources prior to the 11th century mention any quarrel with Roderic on Julian's part; Jones replies that these only seem true if one consults Christian sources, and names both Ibn 'Abd al-Hakam and Ibn al-Qūṭiyya as 9th-century historians who mention both Julian and his rift with Roderic. Jones also cites the 13th-century Arabic annalist Al-Dhahabi and refers readers to an English translation by William McGuckin de Slane: Al-Dhahabi records that "Abu Suleyman-Ayub, Ibn al-Hakim, Ibn Abdallah, Ibn Melka, Ibn Bitro (Note: Cf. Boutros), Ibn Ilyan, was originally a Goth"...Ilyan who conducted the Muslims into Spain was his ancestor. He died in 326 [ AH ] (937-8 [ AD ])." in

The first full passage on Ilyan in Ibn ʿAbd al-Ḥakam's Chapter on the Conquest of Spain reads (in the 19th-century English translation):

The governor of the straits between this district and Andalus was a foreigner called Ilyan, Lord of Septa. He was also the governor of a town called Alchadra, situated on the same side of the straits of Andalus as Tangiers. Ilyan was a subject of Roderic, the Lord of Andalus [i.e. king of Spain], who used to reside in Toledo. Tarik put himself in communication with Ilyan, and treated him kindly, until they made peace with each other. Ilyan had sent one of his daughters to Roderic, the Lord of Andalus, for her improvement and education; but she became pregnant by him. Ilyan having heard of this, said, I see for him no other punishment or recompense, than that I should bring the Arabs against him. He sent to Tarik, saying, I will bring thee to Andalus; Tarik being at that time in Tlemsen and Musa Ibn Nossevr in Cairwan. But Tarik said I cannot trust thee until thou send me a hostage. So be sent his two daughters, having no other children. Tarik allowed them to remain in Tlemsen, guarding them closely. After that Tarik went to Ilyan who - was in Septa on the straits. The latter rejoicing at his coming, said, I will bring thee to Andalus

— Ibn Abd-el Hakem,

Jones thinks that Christian writers do not mention Julian either out of ignorance, or as a deliberate choice to avoid scandalising their readers with a tale of state betrayal for personal revenge. Jones also finds no reason to doubt the Arab chronicles' assertion that Julian sought revenge for an insult to his daughter, although this is not necessarily the exclusive reason, and admits that the timeline is problematic, as Roderic only became king the same year that Julian is supposed to have betrayed him, and he finds it problematic to interpret the text as implying that the insult occurred before Roderic assumed the kingship. He surmises that Julian sent his daughter to the royal court for her education, where King Roderic forced himself upon her.

Luis García de Valdeavellano writes that, during the Umayyad conquest of North Africa, in "their struggle against the Byzantines and the Berbers, the Arab chieftains had greatly extended their African dominions, and as early as the year 682 Uqba had reached the shores of the Atlantic, but he was unable to occupy Tangier, for he was forced to turn back toward the Atlas Mountains by a mysterious person" who became known to history and legend as Count Julian. Muslim historians have referred to him as Ilyan or Ulyan, "though his real name was probably Julian, the Gothic Uldoin or perhaps Urban or Ulbán or Bulian."

Julian is sometimes regarded as having been a vassal of Roderic, king of the Visigoths in Hispania. But Valdeavellano notes other possibilities, arguing that he probably was a Berber.

We are not certain whether he was a Berber, a Visigoth, or a Byzantine; as a "count" he may have been the ruler of the fortress of Septem, once part of the Visigoth kingdom; or he may have been an exarch or a governor ruling in the name of the Byzantine Empire: or, as appears more likely, he may have been a Berber who was the lord and master of the Catholic Berber tribe of the Gomera.

in

Indeed, historically Ceuta (then called "Septem") and the surrounding territories were the last area of Byzantine Africa to be occupied by the Arabs: around 708 AD, as Muslim armies approached the city, its Byzantine governor, Julian (described as "King of the Ghomara"), changed his allegiance and exhorted the Muslims to invade the Iberian Peninsula. After Julian's death, the Arabs took direct control of the city, which the indigenous Berber tribes resented. They destroyed Septem during the Kharijite rebellion led by Maysara al-Matghari in 740 AD, but Christian Berbers remained there (even if harshly persecuted in the next centuries). in

== Role in the conquest of Hispania ==
=== Rift with Roderic ===
According to the Egyptian historian Ibn 'Abd al-Hakam, writing a century and a half after the events, Julian sent one of his daughters—La Cava in later accounts—to Roderic's court at Toledo for education (and as a gauge of Julian's loyalty) and Roderic subsequently made her pregnant. When Julian learned of the affair he removed his daughter from Roderic's court and, out of vengeance, betrayed Hispania to the Muslim invaders, thus making possible the Umayyad conquest of Hispania. Later ballads and chronicles inflated this tale, Muslims making her out an innocent virgin who was ravished, Christians making her a seductress. In Spanish she came to be known as la Cava Rumía.

However, it might well be only a legend. Personal power politics were possibly at play, as historical evidence points to a civil war among the Visigothic aristocracy. Roderic had been appointed to the throne by the bishops of the Visigothic Catholic church, snubbing the sons of the previous king, Wittiza, who died or was killed in 710. Thus, Wittiza's relatives and partisans fled Iberia for Julian's protection at Ceuta (Septem), the Pillar of Hercules in North Africa on the northern shore of the Maghreb. There, they gathered with Arians and Jews.

At that time, the surrounding area of the Maghreb had recently been conquered by Musa ibn Nusair, who established his governor, Tariq ibn Ziyad, at Tangier with an Arab army of 17,000 men. Julian approached Musa to negotiate the latter's assistance in an effort to topple Roderic.

What is unclear is whether Julian hoped to place a son of Wittiza on the throne and gain power and preference thereby or whether he was intentionally opening up Iberia to foreign conquest. The latter, though unlikely, is possible since Julian may have long been on good terms with the Muslims of North Africa and found them to be more tolerant than the Catholic Visigoths. Moreover, if Julian was the Greek commander of the last Byzantine outpost in Africa, he would have had only a military alliance with the Kingdom of the Visigoths and not been part of it.

Perhaps, then, in exchange for lands in al-Andalus (the Arab name for the area the Visigoths still called by its Roman name, Hispania) or to topple a king and his religious allies, Julian provided military intelligence, troops and ships.

=== Umayyad reconnaissance ===
Musa was initially unsure of Julian's project and so, in July 710, directed Tarif ibn Malluk to lead a probe of the Iberian coast. Legend says that Julian participated as a guide and emissary, arranging for Tarif to be hospitably received by supportive Christians, perhaps Julian's kinsmen, friends, and supporters, who agreed to become allies in the contemplated battle for the Visigothic throne.

The next summer Julian provided the ships to carry Muslim troops across to Europe. Julian also briefed Tariq, their general. The latter left Julian behind among the merchants and crossed the Strait of Hercules with a force of some 17,000 men. He landed at Gibraltar (Jebel Tariq in Arabic) on April 30, 711 and thus began the Umayyad conquest of Hispania.

=== Battle of Guadalete and aftermath ===
Later, in the Battle of Guadalete on July 19, Roderic's army of around 25,000 men was defeated by Tariq's force of approximately 7,000, although some credible sources give Tariq 12,000 soldiers. This occurred largely due to a reversal of fortune when the wings commanded by Roderic's relatives Sisbert and Osbert deserted or switched sides. Legend would later attribute that to a deliberate plan developed by Julian.

Afterwards, Julian was apparently granted the lands he was promised by the Muslims.

== Literary treatments ==
Julian and his putative daughter, Florinda la Cava, are the subject of numerous mediaeval chivalric romances poetry, with extant copies dating to the early modern period, shortly before Cervantes wrote his Don Quixote. Despite having multiple variants, they tend to begin with the phrase "Amores trata Rodrigo..." (Note: “Amroes trata Rodrigo” is translated as “Rodrigo’s in love” by Grieve.)

In Part I, Chapter 41, of Don Quixote (1605), Miguel de Cervantes writes:

Meanwhile, the wind having changed we were compelled to head for the land, and ply our oars to avoid being driven on shore; but it was our good fortune to reach a creek that lies on one side of a small promontory or cape, called by the Moors that of the "Cava rumia," which in our language means "the wicked Christian woman;" for it is a tradition among them that La Cava, through whom Spain was lost, lies buried at that spot; "cava" in their language meaning "wicked woman," and "rumia" "Christian;" moreover, they count it unlucky to anchor there when necessity compels them, and they never do so otherwise. (Spanish text.)

The Jacobean playwright William Rowley recounts Julian's story in his play All's Lost by Lust (c. 1619).

The British writers Sir Walter Scott, Walter Savage Landor, and Robert Southey handle the legends associated with these events poetically: Scott in "The Vision of Don Roderick" (1811), Landor in his tragedy Count Julian (1812), and Southey in Roderick, the Last of the Goths (1814).

The American writer Washington Irving retells the legends in his 1835 Legends of the Conquest of Spain, mostly written while living in that country. These consist of "Legend of Don Roderick," "Legend of the Subjugation of Spain," and "Legend of Count Julian and His Family."

Expatriate Spanish novelist Juan Goytisolo takes up the legends in Count Julian (1970), a book in which he, in his own words, imagines "the destruction of Spanish mythology, its Catholicism and nationalism, in a literary attack on traditional Spain." He identifies himself "with the great traitor who opened the door to Arab invasion." The narrator in this novel, an exile in Morocco, rages against his beloved Spain, forming an obsessive identification with the fabled Count Julian, dreaming that, in a future invasion, the ethos and myths central to Hispanic identity will be totally destroyed.

In 2000, Julian's story became a West End musical, La Cava.
