= Roderick the Last of the Goths =

1814 poem by Robert Southey

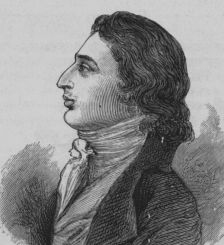
Robert Southey, writer of Roderick the Last of the Goths

Roderick the Last of the Goths is an 1814 epic poem composed by Robert Southey. The origins of the poem lie in Southey's wanting to write a poem describing Spain and the story of Rodrigo. Originally entitled "Pelayo, the Restorer of Spain," the poem was later retitled to reflect the change of emphasis within the story. It was completed after Southey witnessed Napoleon's actions in Europe, and Southey included his reactions against invading armies into the poem. The poem was successful, and multiple editions followed immediately after the first edition.

The story describes fighting over the inheritance of the Spanish throne and how Roderick manages to take over. After Roderick rapes Florinda, daughter of his important ally Count Julian, Julian and others change their allegiance and aid the invading Moorish army. During a battle against the Moors, Roderick is wounded and escapes to start a new life. Eventually, Roderick travels across Spain before determining that he must return to rescue Pelayo, an heir to the Spanish throne who was held prisoner by the Moors. After freeing Pelayo, he meets Florinda who reveals that her rape was not Roderick's fault. The group allies itself with Count Pedro, and they build an army to wage war against the Moors. While fighting, Count Julian is assassinated by his own allies, and the Moorish army is broken and defeated. The poem ends with Roderick returning to the wilderness.

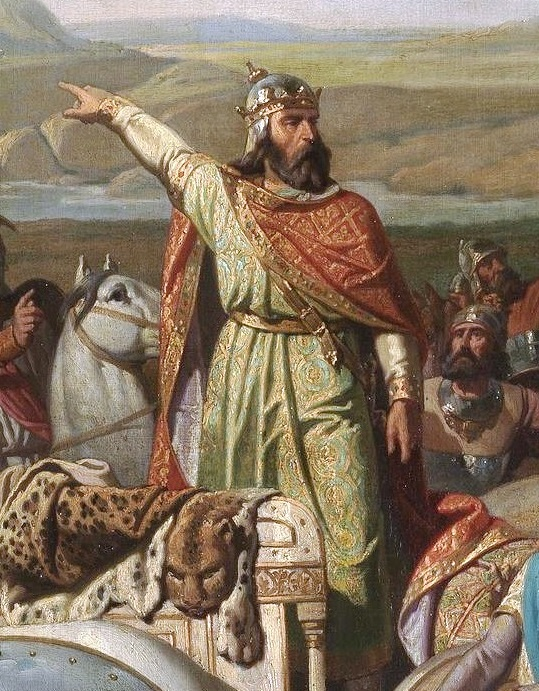
Roderick, the last King of Visigoths in Spain.

Southey, like other poets who described the story of Roderick at the time, connected the Moorish invasion of Spain with Napoleon's invading of other countries. The story is also used to discuss the relationship of Islam and Christianity while promoting Southey's own views on religion. Regarding the rape scene, it is possible that Southey removed Roderick's guilt to create a more sympathetic character. Critics gave the work mixed reviews but many believed that Roderick the Last of the Goths was Southey's greatest work. Some critics pointed out various flaws in the work, but most felt that the subject was well handled and appropriately chosen.

== Background ==
The idea for Southey to write a poem about historical Spain, which would later become Roderick, originated in his writing a monodrama on Cava and her being raped by Rodrigo. In 1805, he decided to use the subject for his final epic. In 1808, Southey resumed working on his poem Curse of Kehama after he almost gave up poetry because of the reception of Thalaba the Destroyer and Madoc. This return to writing was promoted by the poet Walter Savage Landor who encouraged Southey to complete the epic along with writing the work "Pelayo, the Restorer of Spain". This poem would later be retitled Roderick the Last of the Goths. By 1812, Southey was working on various works, including the collection Omniana, and he continued to add sections to Roderick.

After 1810, Southey began to change from Jacobin political feelings to support of the establishment and monarchies. While writing the epic, his feelings were shaped by the events of Napoleon's conquests in Europe and his invasion of Spain. Napoleon's actions provoked Southey to disapprove of one nation controlling another nation. These changing beliefs helped to shape Roderick, which involved the Moorish invasion of Spain. The poem was completed 14 July 1814. During this time, Southey was made a member of the Royal Spanish Academy. It was put into print in August and published in November. It was the last long poem that Southey would write. When Southey was told that Francis Jeffrey was going to write a bad review of the poem, he claimed, "Jeffrey can no more stand in my way to fame than Tom Thumb could stand in my way in the street. I consider him a public nuisance and shall deal with him accordingly." The poem had a second and third edition published in 1815. A fourth edition was published in 1816. The printed poem also included a series of notes, a common feature to his long poems, which drew complaints from reviewers.

== Poem ==
Southey's story of Roderick originally described Pelayo as the hero of the story and his enemy, Roderick, last Visigoth king, as the villain. However, Roderick was portrayed a more sympathetic life as the story changed focus from the focus on Spain to the focus on the tragedy of Roderick. The Visigoths, original rulers of Spain, fall under the invading Moors, which was provoked by the rape of Florinda by Roderick. However, the fall of the Visigoths was also due to internal strife and political disorder. In particular, there was disorder with the ascension of Roderick to the Spanish throne, as Roderick attained it after his father, Theodofred, was blinded by his uncle Witiza. During this time, Pelayo, cousin to Roderick and whose father was killed by Witiza at the prompting of his traitorous mother Favila, fled for his life from Spain. When Roderick takes over, he defends Witiza and spares his other relatives, but the survivors along with Count Julian also aid the Moors in invading Spain.

In the sub plot, Roderick's rape of Florinda leads to Count Julian, her father, turning against Roderick and aiding the Moors. However, Florinda feels that she possibly misled Roderick and caused the incident. She confesses these feelings to Roderick who at that time was using the disguise of Father Maccabee. In her confession, she admits that they kissed and promised to meet again because she was passionately in love with him. However, she decided that her actions were wrong because he was married and she determined that she would become a nun. When she met with Roderick later, he tells her that he wants to leave his wife. In turn, she reveals that she wanted to become a nun, which leads to a fight and, without any description or explanation, she was taken.

The poem's story begins shortly after the Moors invade. The Visigoths are conquered at Guadalete in 711 AD, and Roderick escapes from the battle to start a new life as a hermit. He is plagued with remorse and he feels that all he has brought is suffering. He constantly dreams of Christ bleeding and sees images of Florinda's rape. Eventually, Romano, a monk, is able to comfort Roderick as they travel to a coast hermitage. However, Romano dies and Roderick is left with only his despair as a companion. This life is interrupted by a dream of Rusilla, Roderick's mother, chained and imprisoned until Pelayo saves her. He interprets the dream as a command from God to help his country. Roderick, changed and aged, travels through his country to the unconquered land of Cantabria. After he enters into a ruined city, he meets Adosinda, a woman burying her family. She, the only survivor, tells how the Moors had killed everyone and left her alive to be a concubine. She escaped by killing her captor in his sleep and returned to the city to mourn over the dead. Roderick is given a new name, Maccabee, and is sent by Adosinda to avenge the people killed by the Moors.

Roderick travels to a monastery and learns of the fall of the Visigoths. The only one who has not abandoned the country is Pelayo, but he was a captive at Cordoba. At the monastery, Roderick is ordained before he sets off to free Pelayo. While travelling, he hears stories about himself and people debating over the cause was of the Moorish invasion. Roderick overhears one old man defend him, who turns out to be his tutor Siverian. Siverian, also seeking to free Pelayo, joins with Roderick and they go to Cordoba. They stop by Roderick's old home before going to the tomb of Theodofred. While there, an individual challenges them to fight, and it is revealed that it is Pelayo, who was allowed leave to pray. Roderick and Pelayo discuss how to save their country before Roderick accepts Pelayo as his king. Pelayo returns to his imprisonment while planning his escape, where he is joined by Alphonso, the son of Count Pedro who wishes to marry Pelayo's daughter, and by Florinda, who is hiding to avoid marriage. Together, they escape the city and meet up with Roderick and Siverian.

While in the desert, Florinda confesses the events of her rape to Roderick and reveals that she truly loved Roderick whereas his wife, Egilona, was now married to Abd al-Aziz ibn Musa, a Moorish leader. She also admits that she felt guilty for the seduction. Roderick accepts that his sin was from tragic circumstances and not from his own fault. After the confession, they travel to the land of Count Pedro, father of Alphonso. While there, they discover an army of men wanting to be led off to war. When Pedro sees that the hostages, Pelayo and Alphonso, are free, he decides to go to battle. To settle any past family problems, Pelayo's daughter and Pedro's son marry, and Alphonso is made the heir of the Kingdom of León and promises to keep fighting until the Moors are defeated. However, Moors come and attack at the same time but are stopped by the warriors. A captured Moor tells Pelayo that another invasion force was sent to Pelayo's old castle and the army sets out.

When they arrive at the castle, there is no one to be found. It turns out that Pelayo's family was led by his wife, Gaudiosa, into hiding. When the Moors came, Adosinda was able to defeat the raiding party and free any captives. After blowing a horn as a signal to his people, Pelayo is reunited with his people. Roderick is reunited with his mother but quickly leaves before he talks to her. When Siverian goes to find out what was wrong, he realises that Roderick is overcome with emotion and figures out that Roderick was his old student. The plot transitions to the Moors army as they are busy attacking any rebels. The army is supported by the Spanish traitors. Orpas, a Moorish leader who wanted Florinda as his wife and Julian's lands as his own, begins to work against Julian and turns the Moors against him. After Orpas accuses Julian of inability to convert his own daughter to Islam, Florinda returns to her father with Roderick at her side. After fighting over religion, Roderick tells Julian that Julian is responsible for Spain's misery. Julian attacks Roderick for raping his daughter, but Florinda intervenes and defends Roderick.

The rest of the story describes the reconquest of Spain and the defeat of the Moors by internal fighting. The Moor Abd al-Aziz is assassinated. This causes further suspicions to be laid against Julian, and his rivals decide to assassinate him. Guisla, Pelayo's sister, pretends to join the Moors and convinces them to attack the city of Covadonga. The Spanish army sets a trap in a valley and surrounds the Moors. A quick battle follows, and the Spaniards are able to avenge themselves upon the Moors. At the same time, Julian is assassinated. As he dies, Julian, knowing he was betrayed, tells his loyal troops to join up with the Spaniards. Before he finally passes, he is brought to a chapel dedicated to St. Peter and is received back into the Christian faith. The poem ends with Julian's men joining Pedro's forces as Orpas is killed by Roderick. Taking up a horse, Roderick leads Pelayo's and Pedro's troops against the Moors and everyone realises Roderick's true identity as the previous king. As they begin to fight against the Moors, the Spanish change "Roderick the Goth" and "Roderick and Vengeance" as they began to kill all of the Moors in sight. After the battle, Roderick disappears once again into hermitage.

== Themes ==
Like Walter Scott and Landor, Southey connects the events surrounding Napoleon with the Moors' invasion of Spain within his work. In a letter to Landor, Southey described the rape scene: "here you have a part of the poem so difficult to get over even tolerably that I verily believe if I had at first thought of making Roderick any thing more than a sincere penitent this difficulty would have deterred me from attempting the subject." To overcome the problem with having his main character rape a woman, Southey decided to put some of the responsibility on Florinda and make Roderick more sympathetic. It is also possible that there are autobiographical elements to the scene, especially with Roderick's problematic marriage to a woman he did not love as possibly describing the events of his friend Samuel Taylor Coleridge's life and his love for Sara Hutchinson. This would allow Southey to deal with events from his life in a poetic form.

In terms of religion, Southey depicts a debate between Islam and Christianity. Although Julian defends his faith and attacks Roderick as a sinner, Roderick says that Christianity is a religion of forgiveness and that Julian has turned from God. Although Roderick is a Catholic, his arguments are actually a combination of Deistic theology, Stoic philosophy, and generic Christian ethics that reflect many of Southey's views.

== Critical response ==
Southey's contemporary James Losh believed that the poem was "superior to anything before written by Southey". A letter from Charles Lamb to Southey dated 6 May 1815 said, "I have, since the receipt of your present, read it quite through again, and with no diminished pleasure. I don't know whether I ought to say that it has given me more pleasure than any of your long poems. Kehama is doubtless more powerful, but I don't feel that firm footing in it that I do in Roderick". An anonymous review in the December 1814 Theatrical Inquisitor argued, "It is scarcely possible to view the errors of exalted genius without breathing a sigh of compassion and regret. The generous mind feels humiliated at the contemplation [...] Such are the feelings that must be excited by the reader of Southey's poems [...] The story of the present poem is interesting, and would probably have made an excellent romance. It has, however, several capital defects, that make it altogether unfit for an heroic poem".

This was followed by a March 1815 review by John Herman Merivale in the Monthly Review, which claimed, "We have no scruple in declaring our opinion that this production will contribute to the advancement of the author's legitimate fame more largely than any of his former poems. Its principal faults are that it is too long by half, too declamatory, and consequently often cold and spiritless where it ought to be most impassioned, and that it is incumbered by a pervading affection of scriptural phraseology". Not everything was a problem: "these defects are counterbalanced by a well chosen subject, happily suited to the prevailing enthusiasm of the author's mind in favour of Spanish liberty, by a deep tone of moral and religious feeling, by an exalted spirit of patriotism, by fine touches of character, by animated descriptions of natural scenery [...] and by an occasional excellence of versification worthy of the best and purest age of English poetry. We are sorry to be obliged to qualify this praise by repeating that it applies to the work before us only in part".

Grosvenor Bedford, in an April 1815 Quarterly Review article, stated, "The critic who undertakes to give an epitome of a poem of so high a rank as Roderick, has little to do but to point out in the mass of admirable matter those things which strike him as most worthy of admiration. Original in its plan, true in its fundamental elements, and consistent in its parts, it rouses the feelings, and stimulates those powers of the imagination, which rejoice in the consciousness of exertion." The review concluded, "Of the versification which Mr. Southey has employed we have given our readers sufficient specimens to enable them to judge for themselves. The variety of its cadences gives a spirit which relieves its grandeur, and the redundant syllable at the end of many of the lines prevents the majesty of its tone from oppressing the ear. The language is such as the best authors of the best era of our literature would acknowledge, nor can we give it higher praise than to say that its standard worth would be admitted in the mint of Queen Elizabeth's age."

Also in April 1815 was John Taylor Coleridge's review for the British Critic, which read, "This is the first time that we have had an opportunity of paying Mr. Southey the attention which he deserves; and we avail ourselves of it gladly [...] Mr. Southey is eminently a moral writer; to the high purpose implied in this title, the melody of his numbers, the clear rapidity of his style, the pathetic power which he exercises over our feelings, and the interesting manner of telling his story, whether in verse or prose, are all merely contributive." The review concluded: "here is plenty of sword and dagger, war-horse and chariot, a bugle or two, some little love, several beauties, and even a marriage in prospectu, with all the other ingredients of a 'charming poem.' If any one doat so desperately on 'love and glory,' that this does not content him, we are very sorry, but we cannot honestly recommend Don Roderick to his attention."

An anonymous review in the September 1815 Christian Observer stated, "To the poem of Roderick, Mr. Southey has annexed a voluminous collection of notes. The taste of our elder authors in this respect is now entirely obsolete. Our Shakespeares and Miltons never thought it necessary to ballast their poetry with a mass of prose, and perhaps felt secure that, if they found the text, posterity would not fail to find the commentary." The review concluded, "Those productions, in the mean time, have a far more than compensating merit. On the present occasion, if the commentator of Roderick appears scarcely worthy of the poet, yet he must be a very fastidious, or a very dull reader, who does not find the evil of possessing the commentary, infinitely overpaid by the gratification of reading the poem."

Another anonymous review, in the November 1815 British Review, declared, "The plot naturally claims our first notice, and we think that in this Mr. Southey has been very successful. It is highly dramatic, and affords scope for much play both of passion and feeling, though the latter predominates. Its materials are of heroic caliber, sufficiently dignified for the epic tone, yet blended with those topics to which a chord vibrates in every heart, and to relish which the common feelings of our nature are the only requisite qualification." Like the previous poem, the November review concluded with an emphasis on the notes: "We cannot conclude without entering a strong protest against the modern fashion of encumbering a poem with a body of notes, swelled by quotations, which nobody reads, and every body must pay for. It is a heavy tax on the reading part of the community, and we doubt whether it is one which answers in the end even to those who impose it".

In 1909, Maurice Fitzgerald claimed, in regards to the description of Florinda's rape and confession, that "there are few scenes in English poetry of a more intense dramatic feeling". Ernest Bernhardt-Kabisch agreed and claimed the scene as "one of the most moving and successful of the poem, and, indeed, was Southey's own favorite." However, he went on to argue that "The scene is far from perfect. While the perversity of Florinda's past behavior represents an advance from the flatness of Southey's usual character portraits, it still lacks substance to be fully convincing. The brittle illogic of her action seems less an outgrowth of her psychology than a convenience for the poet, enabling him to exculpate the king without simply abandoning the rape motif of the legend. Even so [...] the scene is a touching one, and the predicament it recalls surprises by its humanity. For once Southey seems to have confronted reality without barricading himself behind moral absolutes." In 2006, William Speck claimed that Roderick was "the last of Southey's long poems, is also the greatest [...] It is a fine, swashbuckling tale, and told with zest."
