= Roderic =

8th-century king of the Visigoths

- King of Hispania, Septimania and Gallaecia
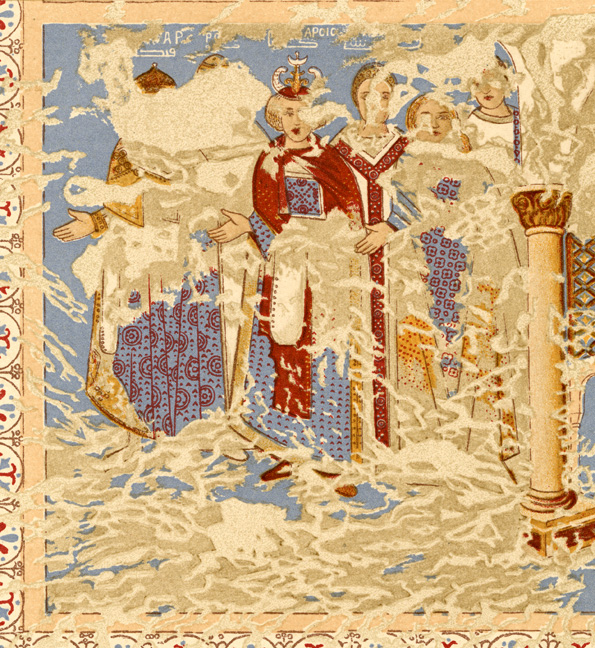
- Roderic depicted as one of the "six kings" in an Umayyad fresco in Qasr Amra, modern-day Jordan, from between 710 and 750. Roderic is the second figure, his face completely lost, with only the tip of his helmet and his robes being visible.

King of the Visigoths
- Reign: 710 – July 711
- Predecessor: Wittiza
- Successor: Achila II
- Born: after 687
- Died: July 711; Visigothic Kingdom
- Spouse: Egilona
- Father: Theodefred
- Mother: Riccilo

Roderic (also spelled Ruderic, Roderik, Roderich, or Roderick; Spanish and Portuguese: Rodrigo, Arabic: لذريق, romanized: Ludharīq; died July 711) was the Visigothic king in Hispania between 710 and 711. He is well known as "the last king of the Goths". He is an obscure figure about whom little can be said with certainty. He was the last Goth to rule from Toledo, but not the last Gothic king, a distinction which belongs to Ardo.

Roderic's election as king was disputed and he ruled only a part of Hispania while an opponent, Achila, ruled the rest. He faced a rebellion from the Basques and the Umayyad invasion, during which he was defeated and killed at the Battle of Guadalete. His widow, Egilona, is believed to have married Abd al-Aziz ibn Musa, the first Muslim governor of Hispania.

== Early life ==
According to the late Chronicle of Alfonso III, Roderic was a son of Theodefred, himself a son of king Chindaswinth and queen Recciberga, and of a woman named Riccilo. Roderic's exact date of birth is unknown but probably was after 687, estimated from his father's marriage having taken place after his exile to Córdoba following the succession of King Egica in that year.

== Succession ==
=== Usurpation ===
According to the Chronicle of 754, Roderic "tumultuously [tumultuose] invaded the kingdom [regnum] with the encouragement of [or at the exhortation of] the senate [senatus]." Historians have long debated the exact meaning of these words. What is generally recognised is that it was not a typical palace coup as had occurred on previous occasions, but rather a violent invasion of the palace which sharply divided the kingdom.

It is probable that the "invasion" was not from outside the kingdom; because the word regnum can refer to the office of the king, it is likely that Roderic merely usurped the throne. Nonetheless, it is possible that Roderic was a regional commander (dux of Baetica in later, legendary sources) or even an exile when he staged his coup.

The "tumult" which surrounded this usurpation was probably violent, though whether or not it involved the deposition or assassination of the legitimate king, Wittiza, or was a consequence of his recent natural death has divided scholars. Some scholars believe that the king Achila, who ruled in opposition to Roderic, was in fact Wittiza's son and successor and that Roderic had tried to usurp the throne from him.

The senate with which Roderic accomplished his coup was probably composed of the "leading aristocrats and perhaps also some of the bishops." The participation of churchmen in the revolt is disputed, some arguing that the support of the bishops would not have led to the act being labelled a usurpation. The body of leading temporal and ecclesiastical lords had been the dominant body in determining the Visigothic succession since the reign of Reccared I. The palatine officials, however, had not been much affected by royal measures to decrease their influence in the final decades of the kingdom, as their effecting of a coup in 711 indicates.

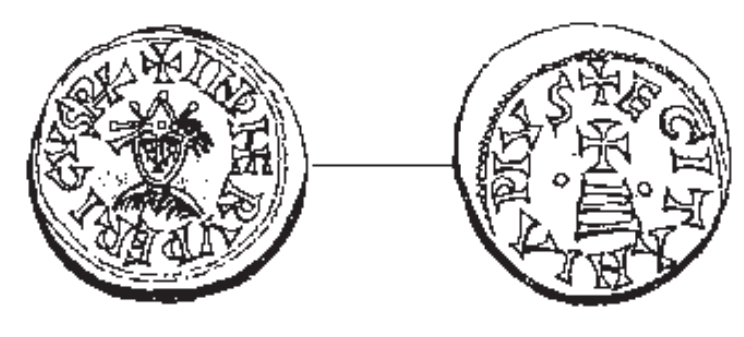
A coin minted in Roderic's name at Egitania

=== Division of the kingdom ===
After the coup, the division of the kingdom into two factions, with the southwest (the provinces of Lusitania and western Carthaginiensis around the capital Toledo) in Roderic's hands and the northeast (Tarraconensis and Narbonensis) in the hands of Achila is confirmed by archaeological and numismatic evidence. Roderic's twelve surviving coins, all bearing the name Rvdericvs, were minted at Toledo, probably his capital, and "Egitania", probably Idanha-a-Velha. The regions in which the coins have been discovered do not overlap and it seems highly probable that the two rulers ruled in opposition from different regions. It is unknown to whom the provinces of Gallaecia and Baetica fell. That Roderic and Achila never appear to have come into military conflict is probably best explained by the preoccupation of Roderic with Arab raids and not to a formal division of the kingdom.

A Visigothic regnal list mentions "Ruderigus" as having reigned seven years and six months, while two other continuations of the Chronicon Regum Visigothorum record Achila's reign of three years. In contrast to the regnal lists, which cannot be dated, the Chronicle of 754, written at Toledo, says that "Rudericus" reigned for a year.

== War with the Muslims ==
According to the Chronicle of 754, Roderic immediately upon securing his throne gathered a force to oppose the Arabs and Berbers (Mauri, whence the word "Moors"), who were raiding in the south of the Iberian peninsula and had destroyed many towns under Tariq ibn Ziyad and other Muslim generals. While later Arabic sources make the conquest of Hispania a singular event undertaken at the orders of the governor Musa ibn Nusair of Ifriqiya, according to the Chronicle, which was written much nearer in date to the actual events, the Arabs began disorganised raids and undertook to conquer the peninsula only with the fortuitous death of Roderic and the collapse of the Visigothic nobility.

Paul the Deacon's Historia Langobardorum records that the Saracens invaded "all Hispania" from Septem (Ceuta).

Roderic made several expeditions against the invaders before he was deserted by his troops and killed in battle in 711 or 712. The Chronicle of 754 claims that some of the nobles who had accompanied Roderic on his last expedition did so out of "ambition for the kingdom", perhaps intending to allow him to die in battle so that they could secure the throne for one of themselves. Whatever their intentions, most of them seem to have died in the battle as well.

Other historians have suggested that low morale amongst the soldiery because of Roderic's disputed succession was the cause of defeat. The majority of Roderic's soldiers may have been poorly trained and unwilling slave conscripts; there were probably few freemen left fighting for the Goths.

The location of the battle is debatable. It probably occurred near the mouth of the Guadalete river, hence its name, the Battle of Guadalete. According to Paul the Deacon, the site was the otherwise unidentifiable "Transductine promontories".

According to the Chronicle of 754, the Arabs took Toledo in 711 and executed many nobles still in the city on the pretense that they had assisted in the flight of Oppa, a son of Egica. Since it took place, according to the same chronicle, after Roderic's defeat, either the defeat must be moved back to 711 or the conquest of Toledo pushed back to 712; the latter is preferred by Collins. It is possible that the Oppa who fled Toledo and was a son of a previous king was the cause of the "internal fury" which wracked Hispania at the time recorded in the Chronicle. Perhaps Oppa had been declared king at Toledo by Roderic and Achila's rivals, either before Roderic's final defeat or between his death and the Arab capture of Toledo. If so, the death of the nobles who had "ambition for the kingdom" may have been Oppa's supporters who were killed in Toledo by the Arabs shortly after the battle in the south.

According to a 9th-century chronicle, a tombstone with the inscription Hic requiescit Rodericus, rex Gothorum (here rests Roderic, king of the Goths) was found at Egitania (modern Idanha-a-Velha, Portugal). According to the legend of Nazaré the king fled the battlefield alone. Roderic left a widow, Egilo, who later married one of the Arabic governors of Hispania, Abd al-Aziz ibn Musa.

== In legend and literature ==
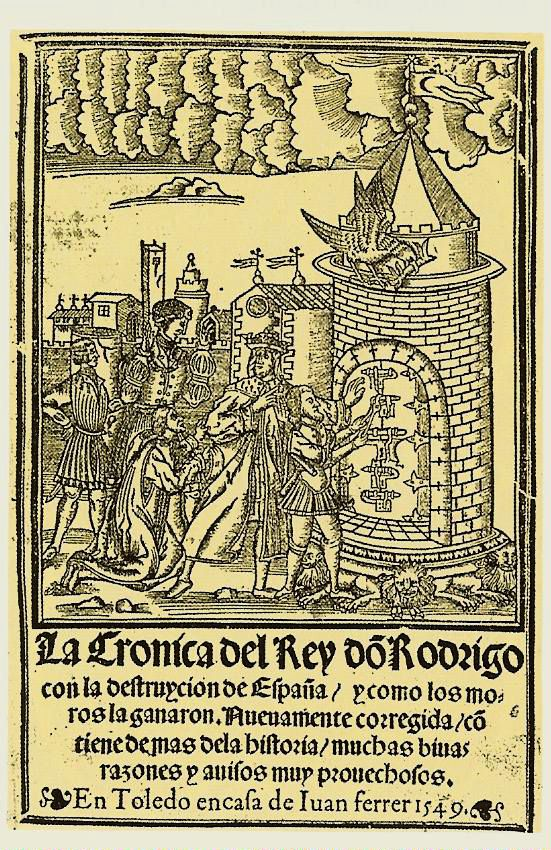
Titlepage of La Crónica del rey don Rodrigo (The Chronicle of the Lord King Roderic) published by Juan Ferrer (1549), recounting the legendary deeds of Roderic

According to a legend that was for centuries treated as historical fact, Roderic seduced or raped the daughter of Count Julian, known in late accounts as Florinda la Cava. The tale of romance and treachery has inspired many works.

According to the Legend of Nazaré, Roderic acquired the stature of Our Lady of Nazaré during the Battle of Guadalete.

Roderic’s life is alluded to in Nights 272 and 273 of the One Thousand and One Nights. In the story, a king opens a mysterious door in his castle that was locked and sealed shut by the previous kings. The king discovers paintings of Muslim soldiers in the room and a note saying that the city of Labtayt will fall to the soldiers in the paintings if the room is ever opened. The king is later killed by Tariq ibn Ziyad. The details coincide with the fall of Toledo.

Roderic is a central figure in the English playwright William Rowley's tragedy All's Lost by Lust, which portrays him as a rapist usurped by Count Julian and the Moors.

The Scottish writer Walter Scott and the English writers Walter Savage Landor and Robert Southey handled the legends associated with those events poetically: Scott in "The Vision of Don Roderick" in 1811; Landor in his tragedy Count Julian in 1812; and Southey in "Roderick the Last of the Goths", in 1814.

The American writer Washington Irving retold the legends in his Legends of the Conquest of Spain (1835), mostly written while living in that country. These consist of "Legend of Don Roderick", "Legend of the Subjugation of Spain", and "Legend of Count Julian and His Family".

Roderic has been mentioned in Nathaniel Hawthorne's short story "Egotism; or, The Bosom-Serpent" by the name of "Don Rodrigo, the Goth" as a sinner that shares a common vice with "a man of impure life, and a brazen face".

In Alexander Pushkin's unfinished poem Rodrik (Russian Родрик) Roderic survives the last battle, becomes a hermit and gets a promise of victory from Heaven.

Roderic has been the subject of three operas: Rodrigo by George Frideric Handel, Don Rodrigo (the first mexican opera, music lost) by Manuel de Sumaya and Don Rodrigo by Alberto Ginastera.

Roderic appears as a minor character in the first half of Portuguese early Romantic writer Alexandre Herculano's novel Eurico, o Presbítero ("Euric, the Presbyter", 1844).

Roderic's story is told the British West End musical La Cava (2000).

Regnal titles
Preceded by Wittiza	King of the Visigoths; 710–711	Succeeded by Achila II
Preceded by Wittiza	King of the Visigoths; 710–711	Succeeded by Tariq ibn Ziyad as Governor of Al Andalus
