= Matilde Isabel de Sant'Ana e Vasconcelos Moniz de Betencourt =

Portuguese writer and noblewoman

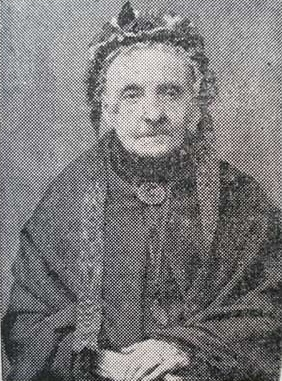
- Born: March 14, 1805; Funchal, Madeira
- Died: December 23, 1888 (aged 83); Funchal, Madeira
- Occupation(s): Poet, writer, translator
- Spouse: Jacinto de Sant'Ana e Vasconcelos Moniz de Betencourt
- Children: Jacinto de Sant'Ana e Vasconcelos Moniz de Betencourt

Matilde Isabel de Sant'Ana e Vasconcelos Moniz de Betencourt (March 14, 1805–December 23, 1888) was a Portuguese viscountess, born in Funchal, Madeira to two distinguished Madeiran families, who held the title of Viscondessa das Nogueiras. She wrote articles and poems, published in newspapers, almanacs, and literary anthologies, as well as two novels. She also wrote "Diálogos entre u ma Avó e sua Neta" ("Dialogue between a grandmother and her granddaughter"), selected by the Portuguese Higher Council for Public Instruction for use in schools, which was the first such work adopted in Portugal to be written by a woman.

Speaking both English and French, she also translated a number of French works into Portuguese, including "Genoveva" by Lamartine and "As Castellũs do Roussillon" by Madame de la Rochère. The book Eurico, by Alexandre Herculano, she instead translated from Portuguese into French. The publication of this translation in Paris was sponsored by Nicolaus of Oldenburg.

== Biography ==
Matilde Isabel de Vasconcelos was born on March 14, 1805 in Funchal, Madeira to José Joaquim de Vasconcelos and D. Francisca Emilia Teles de Meneses, both members of distinguished Madeiran families. Her father was an agricultural inspector, an "intendente das estradas", and inspector for the Funchal customs office. Her mother was the granddaughter of Feliciana Williams, a British woman born on the islands of Saint Kitts and Nevis, and related to the Symmonds and Brownes who governed that colony. Her education was good for the time, largely consisting of languages (like French, English, Italian, and Latin) and music.

In 1823, at age 18, she married Jacinto de Santana e Vasconcelos Moniz Bettencourt in Santa Luzia, the same place her parents had been married. Her husband was of French-Portuguese origin. In 1824 they had a son, Jacinto Augusto de Santana e Vasconcelos Moniz de Bettencourt, and in an uncertain year, possibly 1825, they had a daughter, Matilde Lúcia de Santana e Vasconcelos Moniz de Bettencourt. She was the grandmother of Maria Celina, Maria das Dores, and Matilde Sauvaire da Câmara. She was considered to be a very cultured woman, once called the "New Alcipe". Her husband received his title as "Visconde das Nogueiras", and she received her title as "Viscondessa das Nogueiras", in 1867.

Her career started with several anonymously published translations of French works, including "Castellãs de Roussillon" by Madame de la Rochère and “Genoveva” by Alphonse de Lamartine. Her first non-anonymous work was the historical novel "O soldado de Aljuburrota" in 1857, followed by "Diálogos entre u ma Avó e sua Neta" in 1862. The latter was an educational work, selected by the Portuguese Higher Council for Public Instruction for use in schools, the first such work to be adopted in Portugal written by a woman. She also wrote poems, which at the time were only published in literary anthologies, including "Flores de Madeira" in 1872 and the "Album madeirense" in 1884, as well as in Portuguese almanacs and some newspapers. She also wrote articles for some newspapers. However, a significant portion of her poetry remained handwritten and were distributed in "alba amicorum". As of 1917, her work had never been collected into a volume.

She died in S. Pedro, Funchal, in 1888.

== Poem sample ==
The poem "Uma noite de luar" ("A moonlit night"), included in the Album Madeirense, gives an example of her work. The first five verses are given below:

Já de estrellas recamado
A noite estendeu o veo,
Fulguram astros brilhantes
No panorama do ceu;
E sobre a praia arenosa
Rola a vaga preguiçosa.

Nuvem não ha que escureça
O azul do firmamento.
Roçam apenas nas folhas
As leves azas do vento;
Canta em loureiro visinho
O rouxinol num raminho.

E o fugitivo planeta
Que o ceu deixára apressado,
Quando alli viu girar
Do sol o carro dourado,
Agora, vagando errante,
Nos mostra a face radiante:

Tem já metade cruzado
Das celestes regiões,
Onde formam as estrellas
Formosas constellações,
Que variam na figura
Por sua fórma e altura:

O frouxo pallor que esparge
Sobre o lago prateado
Deixa na face das ondas
Um novo ceu retratado,
Onde se mira valdosa
Da noite a princeza airosa.

— Viscondessa Das Nogueiras, Uma Noite De Luar
