= Achila =

Achila may refer to:

- Achila, Bohol, village in the Philippines
- Achila II, king of the Visigoths
- Agila, also called Achila I, king of the Visigoths
