= Seven Pagodas of Mahabalipuram =

Art & architecture

Coordinates: 12°37′N 80°12′E

"Seven Pagodas" has served as a nickname for the southern Indian city of Mamallapuram, also called Mahabalipuram (old name), since the first European explorers reached it. The phrase "Seven Pagodas" refers to a belief that has circulated in India, Europe, and other parts of the world for over eleven centuries. The group of Monuments at Mahabalipuram, including the Shore Temple built in the 8th century under the reign of Narasimhavarman II, stand at the shore of the Bay of Bengal. Legend has it that six other temples once stood with it.

== Legend ==
An ancient Hindu legend explains the pagodas' origin. Prince Hiranyakasipu refused to worship the god Vishnu. The prince's son, Prahlada, loved Vishnu greatly and criticized his father's lack of faith. Hiranyakasipu banished Prahlada but then relented and allowed him to come home. Father and son quickly began to argue about Vishnu's nature. When Prahlada stated that Vishnu was present everywhere, including in the walls of their home, his father kicked a pillar. Vishnu emerged from the pillar in the form of a man with a lion's head, and slayed Hiranyakasipu. Prahlada eventually became king, and had a grandson named Bali (also called Mahabali). Bali founded Mahabalipuram on this site.

== Ancient evidence ==
The temples' origins have been obscured by time, lack of complete written records, and destruction of architectural proof by Turko-Persian invaders. Englishman D. R. Fyson, a long-time resident of Madras (now Chennai), wrote a concise book on the city titled Mahabalipuram or Seven Pagodas, which he intended as a souvenir volume for Western visitors. In it, he states that the Pallava monarch Narasimharavarman I either began or greatly enlarged upon Mahabalipuram, circa 630. Archaeological evidence has not yet clearly proven whether Narasimharavarman I's city was the earliest to inhabit this location.

About 30 years before the founding of Narasimharavarman I's city, Pallava Monarch Mahendravarman I had begun a series of "cave temples," which were carved into rocky hillsides Contrary to what the name suggests, they often did not begin as natural caves. Mahendravarman I and Narasimharavarman I also ordered construction of free-standing temples, called rathas in the region's language, Tamil. Nine rathas currently stand at the site (Ramaswami, 209). Construction of both types of temples in Mahabalipuram appears to have ended around 640 (Fyson 3). Fyson states that archaeological evidence supports the claim that a monastery (vihara in Tamil) existed in ancient Mahabalipuram. The idea is based on the concept of Sadhus (Saints). Fyson suggests that the Saint's' quarters may have been divided between a number of the city's rathas, based on their division into small rooms. Hinduism's stupam design influence is also apparent in the traditional pagoda shape of the Shore Temple and other remaining architecture (Fyson 5).

Fyson devoted only the next to the last page of his slim book to the actual legend of the seven pagodas (Fyson 28). He recounts a local belief regarding the pagodas, that the god Indra became jealous of this earthly city and sank it during a great storm, leaving only the Shore Temple above water. He also recounts the assertion of the local Tamil people that at least some of the other temples can be seen "glittering beneath the waves" from fishing boats (Fyson 28). Whether the six missing pagodas exist does not seem to matter much to Fyson; As he was trying to frame the theory according to his assumption and amusements. He wanted to make his book "The Seven Pagodas" give his beloved city its nickname and fame, and that seems to be the important part for him. However, the six missing temples have continued to fascinate locals, archaeologists, and lovers of legends alike, and have recently returned to the archaeological spotlight.

== European explorers ==
Indian historian N. S. Ramaswami names Marco Polo as one of the earliest European visitors to Mahabalipuram. Polo left few details of his visit but did mark it on his Catalan Map of 1275 (Ramaswami, 210).

Many Europeans later spoke of the Seven Pagodas following travellers to their colonies in India. The first to write of them was John Goldingham, an English astronomer living in Madras in the late 18th and early 19th centuries. He wrote an account of his visit and the legend in 1798, which was later collected by Mark William Carr in his 1869 book Descriptive and Historical Papers Relating to the Seven Pagodas on the Coromandel Coast. Goldingham mainly described art, statues, and inscriptions found throughout the archaeological site at Mahabalipuram. He copied many of the inscriptions by hand and included them in his essay. Goldingham interprets most of the signs as picture-symbols, and discusses what meaning their shapes may have (Goldingham, 30-43). Benjamin Guy Babington, author of another essay in the same volume, identified several of the figures in Goldingham's copied inscriptions as Telugu letters (Goldingham, 43). Babington's note on the text is included as a footnote to Goldingham's work.

In 1914, British writer J.W. Coombes related the common European belief on the origin of the pagoda legend. According to him, the pagodas once stood on the edge of the shore, and their copper domes reflected sunlight and served as a nautical landmark. He claims that modern people do not know for sure how many pagodas once existed. He believes that the number was close to seven (Coombes, 27).

N. S. Ramaswami places much of the responsibility for the legend's European propagation on the poet Robert Southey, who mentioned it in his poem "The Curse of Kehama," published in 1810 (Ramaswami, 205). He refers to the city by another of its popular names, Bali. In his poem, Southey clearly states that more than one of the Seven Pagodas is visible (See stanza 4). Southey told romantic tales of many cultures around the world, including India, Rome, Portugal, Paraguay, and Native American tribes, all of which were based on accounts of others' travels, and his own imagination. "The Curse of Kehama" certainly played a role in rising European fascination with the legend.

Ramaswami's words for European explorers are not entirely negative. He notes that, before Europeans began to visit Southern India toward the beginning of the British Raj, many of the smaller monuments at Mahabalipuram were partially or entirely covered with sand. The Europeans and their families played an important role in uncovering the archaeological sites in their free time. Once early English archaeologists realized the extent and beauty of the site, toward the end of the 18th century, they appointed experienced antiquarians such as Colin Mackenzie to preside over the dig (Ramaswami, 210).

JW Coombes Collection

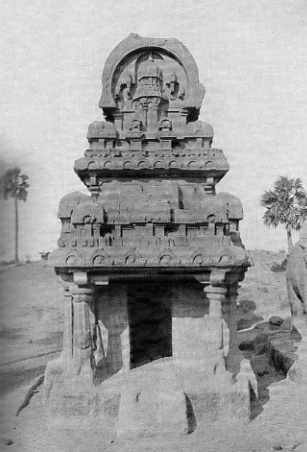
Nakula and Sahadeva's Rathas, part of the Seven Pagodas complex, circa 1914. Courtesy J.W. Coombes

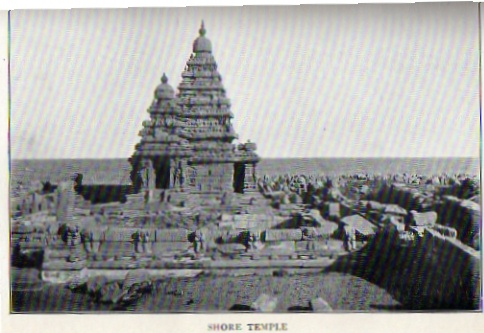
Shore Temple, circa 1914. Courtesy J.W. Coombes

== Missing evidence ==
Before the December 2004 tsunami, evidence for the existence of the Seven Pagodas was largely anecdotal. The existence of the Shore Temple, smaller temples, and rathas supported the idea that the area had strong religious significance, but there was little contemporary evidence save one Pallava-era painting of the temple complex. Ramaswami wrote in his 1993 book Temples of South India that evidence of 2000 years of civilization, 40 currently visible monuments, including two "open air bas-reliefs," and related legends spreading through both South Asia and Europe had caused people to build up Mahabalipuram's mystery in their minds (Ramaswami, 204). He claims explicitly that "There is no sunk city in the waves off Mamallapuram. The European name, 'The Seven Pagodas,' is irrational and cannot be accounted for" (Ramaswami, 206).

Anecdotal evidence can be truthful though, and in 2002 scientists decided to explore the area off the shore of Mahabalipuram, where many modern Tamil fishermen claimed to have glimpsed ruins at the bottom of the sea. This project was a joint effort between the National Institute of Oceanography (India) and the Scientific Exploration Society, U.K. (Vora). The two teams found the remains of walls beneath 5 to 8 meters of water and sediment, 500 to 700 meters off the coast. The layout suggested that they belonged to several temples. Archaeologists dated them to the Pallava era, roughly when Mahendravarman I and Narasimharavarman I ruled the region (Vora). NIO scientist K.H. Vora noted after the 2002 exploration that the underwater site probably contained additional structures and artifacts, and merited future exploration (Vora).

== During the tsunami ==
Immediately before the 2004 tsunami struck the Indian Ocean, including the Bay of Bengal, the ocean water off Mahabalipuram's coast pulled back approximately 500 meters. Tourists and residents who witnessed this event from the beach recalled seeing a long, straight row of large rocks emerge from the water. As the tsunami rushed to shore, these stones were covered again by water. However, centuries' worth of sediment that had covered them was gone. The tsunami also made some immediate, lasting changes to the coastline, which left a few previously covered statues and small structures uncovered on the shore.

== After the tsunami ==
Eyewitness accounts of tsunami relics stirred popular and scientific interest in the site. Perhaps the most famous archaeological finding after the tsunami was a large stone lion, which the changing shoreline left sitting uncovered on Mahabalipuram's beach. Archaeologists have dated it to the 7th century CE. Locals and tourists have flocked to see this statue since shortly after the tsunami.

In April 2005, the Archaeological Survey of India (ASI) and the Indian Navy began searching the waters off the coast of Mahabalipuram by boat, using sonar technology (Das). They discovered that the row of large stones people had seen immediately before the tsunami were part of a 6-foot-high (Biswas), 70-meter-long wall. ASI and the Navy also discovered remains of two other submerged temples and one cave temple within 500 meters of the shore (Das). Although these findings do not necessarily correspond to the seven pagodas of legend, they do indicate that a large complex of temples was in Mahabalipuram. This draws the legend closer to fact—and there are likely many more discoveries waiting to be found.

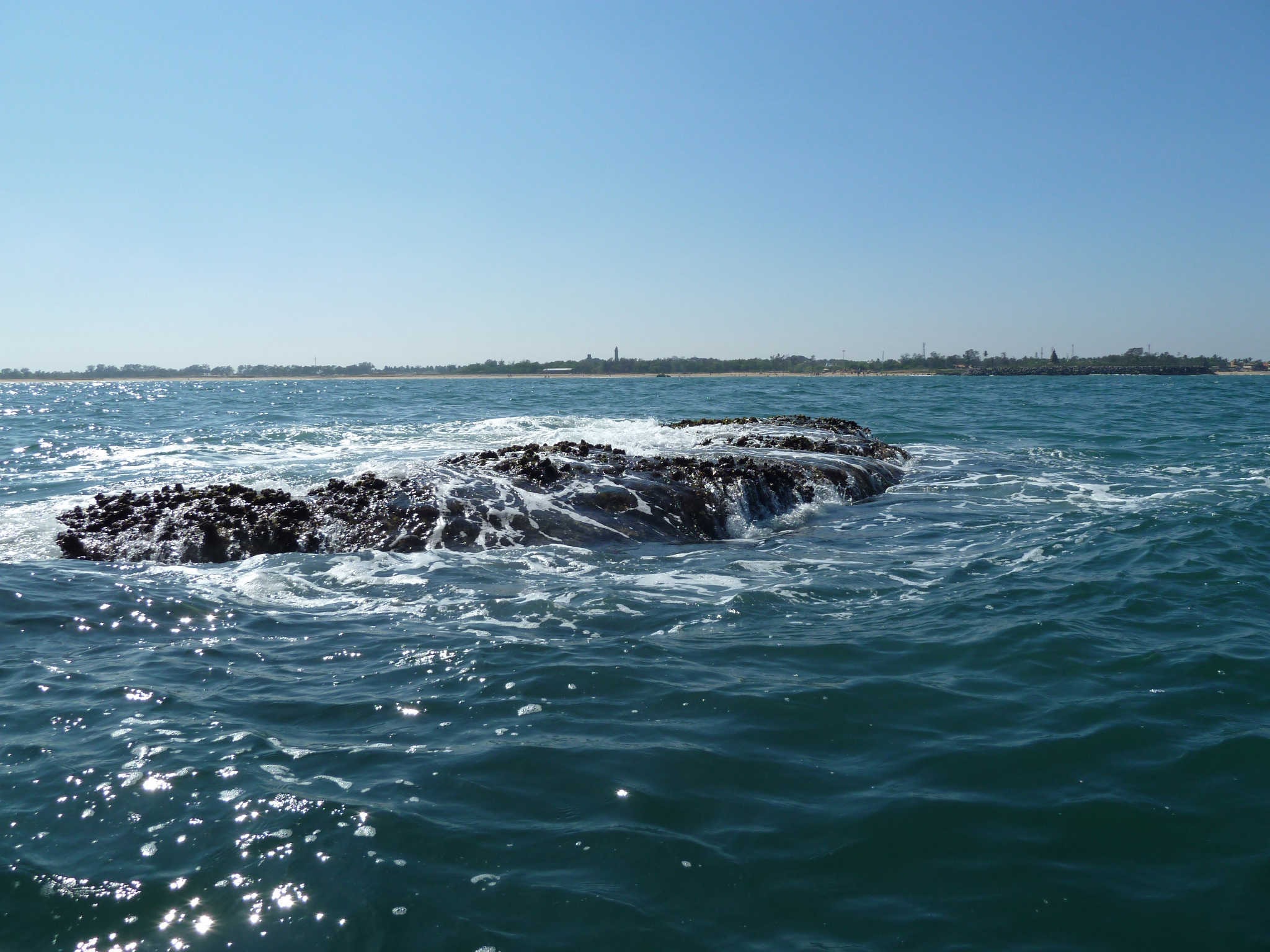
Submerged Temple at Mahabalipuram

ASI archaeologist Alok Tripathi told The Times of India that, as of his February 2005 interview, sonar exploration had mapped inner and outer walls of the two previously submerged temples. He explained that his team could not yet suggest the functions of these buildings (Das). A.K. Sharma of the Indian Navy could not provide further speculation as to function either, but told The Times of India that the layout of the submerged structures, in relation with the Shore Temple and other exposed structures, closely matched a Pallava-era painting of the Seven Pagodas complex (Das).

Archaeologist T. Satyamurthy of ASI also mentions the great significance of a large inscribed stone the waves uncovered. The inscription stated that King Krishna III had paid for the keeping of an eternal flame at a particular temple. Archaeologists began digging in the vicinity of the stone, and quickly found the structure of another Pallava temple. They also found many coins and items that would have been used in ancient Hindu religious ceremonies (Maguire). While excavating this Pallava-era temple, archaeologists also uncovered the foundations of a Tamil Sangam-period temple, dating back approximately 2000 years (Maguire). Most archaeologists working on the site believe that a tsunami struck sometime between the Tamil Sangam and Pallava periods, destroying the older temple. Widespread layers of seashells and other ocean debris support this theory (Maguire).

ASI also unexpectedly located a much older structure on the site. A small brick structure, formerly covered by sand, stood on the beach following the tsunami. Archaeologists examined the structure, and dated it to the Tamil Sangam period. Although this structure does not necessarily fit in with the traditional legend, it adds intrigue and the possibility of yet-unexplored history to the site.

The current consensus among archaeologists is that yet another tsunami destroyed the Pallava temples in the 13th century. ASI scientist G. Thirumoorthy told the BBC that physical evidence of a 13th-century tsunami can be found along nearly the entire length of India's East Coast.

== Notes ==
- Application of Geological and Geophysical Methods in Marine Archaeology and Underwater Explorations. Scientific Achievements: 5. Tamil Nadu. K H. Vora. National Institute of Oceanography, Goa, India. 16 Sep. 2006 <https://web.archive.org/web/20050210100642/http://www.nio.org/projects/vora/project_vora_5.jsp>.
- BBC Staff. "India Finds More 'Tsunami Gifts'." From staff reports. BBC News (Online) 27 Feb. 2005: 1-5. . . Retrieval 16 Sep. 2006 <http://news.bbc.co.uk/2/hi/south_asia/4302115.stm>.
- Biswas, Soutik. "Tsunami Throws up India Relics." BBC News (Online) 11 Feb. 2005. Retrieval 16 Sep. 2006 <http://news.bbc.co.uk/2/hi/south_asia/4257181.stm>.
- Coombes, J.W. (Josiah Waters). The Seven Pagodas. London, UK: Selley, Service & Co., Ltd., 1914.
- Das, Swati. "Tsunami Unveils 'Seven Pagodas'." The Times of India 25 Feb. 2005. Retrieval 12 Sep. 2006 <http://timesofindia.indiatimes.com/articleshow/1032004.cms>.
- Fyson, D. R. Mahabalipuram or Seven Pagodas. Madras, Tamil Nadu, India: Higginbothams, Publishers, 1931.
- Goldingham, J. "Some account of the Sculptures at Mahabalipuram; usually called the Seven Pagodas." Descriptive and Historical Papers Relating to The Seven Pagodas on the Coromandel Coast. Ed. Mark William Carr. New Delhi, India: Asian Educational Services, 1984. Reprinted from the original 1869 edition.
- Maguire, Paddy. "Tsunami Reveals Ancient Temple Sites." BBC News (Online) 27 Oct. 2005. Retrieval 9 Sep. 2006 <http://news.bbc.co.uk/2/hi/south_asia/4312024.stm>.
- Ramaswami, N. S. Temples of South India. Madras, Tamil Nadu, India: Maps and Agencies, 1993.
- Schulberg, Lucille and the Editors of Time-Life Books. Historic India. Series: Great Ages of Man, a History of the World's Cultures. New York, NY: Time-Life Books, 1968.
- Subramanian, T. S. "The Secret of the Seven Pagodas." Frontline 22.10 (May 2005). The Hindu Online. 16 Sep. 2006 <https://web.archive.org/web/20071017211521/http://www.hinduonnet.com/fline/fl2210/stories/20050520005812900.htm>.
- all information about Pagodas <http://mahabalipuramtours.com >
