= The Vaulted Ceiling =

1851 novel by Alexandre Herculano

- Author: Alexandre Herculano
- Publication date: 1851

The Vaulted Ceiling (Portuguese: A Abóbada) is an 1851 historical novel by Alexandre Herculano.

Set in 1401, it deals with the construction of Batalha Monastery by the blind architect Afonso Domingues.

== See also ==
- Alexandre Herculano
- Romanticism in Portugal

== Bibliography ==
- Dicionário Universal Ilustrado, Ed. João Romano Torres & Cª.1911.
