= Al-Hurr ibn Abd al-Rahman al-Thaqafi =

8th-century Umayyad governor of Al-Andalus

al-Hurr ibn Abd al-Rahman al-Thaqafi
- الحر بن عبد الرحمن الثقفي

Umayyad Governor of al-Andalus
- In office 716–719
- Preceded by: Ayyub ibn Habib al-Lakhmi
- Succeeded by: Al-Samh ibn Malik al-Khawlani

Personal details
- Born: Taif, Arabia
- Parent: Abd al-Rahman ibn Umm al-Hakam al-Thaqafi (father)

Al-Ḥurr ibn ʿAbd al-Raḥmān al-Thaqafi (Arabic: الحر بن عبد الرحمن الثقفي) was an early Umayyad governor who ruled the Muslim province of Al-Andalus from between 716 and 718. He was the third successor to Musa bin Nusair, the North African governor who had directed the conquest of Visigothic Hispania several years earlier in 711. Al-Hurr was the first Muslim commander to cross the Pyrenees in 717, leading a small raiding party into Septimania. His incursions were largely unsuccessful, for which he was deposed in 718.

== Background ==
In 711, an Umayyad army led by freedman Tariq bin Ziyad had been sent to the Iberian Peninsula under the orders of North African governor Musa bin Nusair, resulting in its eventual conquest. Leaving his son 'Abd al-'Aziz in charge, Musa led a triumphant procession of over 400 well-dressed Visigothic princes, followed by slaves and prisoners of war, to the Caliph al-Walid I in Damascus. During that visit, Musa dramatically fell out of favor with al-Walid: Tariq informed the caliph that the treasure paraded, for which Musa had claimed credit, had actually been captured by himself instead. Musa was stripped of his status, and 'Abd al-'Aziz remained in charge of the newly conquered territories, which were now named "Al-Andalus."

== Governorship ==
After the assassination of Abd al-Aziz in 716, and the six-month rule of his cousin Ayyub ibn Habib al-Lakhmi, al-Hurr ibn 'abd al-Rahman al-Thaqafi was assigned the post. Soon afterwards, he relocated the Andalusian administrative capital from Seville to Córdoba.

Al-Hurr was heavily involved in trying to suppress Christian Gothic resistance, and was largely successful in doing so. He's actually credited with the pacification of virtually all Visigothic Hispania, except for the mountain ranges of the Basque region, most of the Pyrenees and the still almost intact Duchy of Cantabria in the north of the Peninsula. After his rule in al-Andalus, the realm would become years later the leading realm in the Reconquista. Some historians date the small Battle of Covadonga at the end of his term in office, in 718.

Under the governorate of al-Hurr, coins with bilingual Arabic and Latin inscriptions were minted. He also laid the foundations of the future Umayyad administration by sending Umayyad officials to towns, setting up rules for the management of real estate and taxation imposed on it (the tributa or land based taxation), returning property to Christian owners where applicable and punishing Berbers for looting and concealment of undeclared acquisition of goods. This job of establishing a civil administration was continued by his successor Al-Samh ibn Malik al-Khawlani and completed by the wali Yahya ibn Salama al-Kalbi.

Al-Hurr also turned his attention to the Aquitanians (referred in most Arabic chronicles as "Franks") across the Pyrenees. Sources suggest he was enticed by the treasure hoarded in the convents and churches, or maybe chasing refugees, or taking advantage of the civil war going on between the chief officers of the Merovingian court with the involvement of Odo the Great, duke of Aquitaine. None of al-Hurr's predecessors had attempted to cross the Pyrenees, and in 717, he attempted to do just that. He led a small expedition across the range into still Gothic Septimania, the first of which was likely to just reconnoiter the region. Several attempted raids later, all of which proved unsuccessful, al-Hurr was deposed by the caliph, who appointed Al-Samh ibn Malik al-Khawlani in 718 as his replacement. Al-Samh continued expeditions into present-day France, reaching as far as the Rhône, but would be killed in the Battle of Toulouse in 721.

== Notes ==
Preceded by Ayyub ibn Habib al-Lakhmi	Governor of Al-Andalus; 716–719	Succeeded by Al-Samh ibn Malik al-Khawlani
