= Ayyub ibn Habib al-Lakhmi =

Umayyad governor of Al-Andalus

Ayyub ibn Habib al-Lakhmi (fl. AD 716) was the second Umayyad Governor of Al-Andalus who succeeded his cousin Abd al-Aziz ibn Musa. He ruled for only 6 months, after which he moved to Cordoba and made it the capital of Muslim Iberia in place of Toledo.

Preceded by Abd al-Aziz ibn Musa	Governor of Al-Andalus; 716	Succeeded by Al-Hurr ibn Abd al-Rahman al-Thaqafi
