= Eurico, the Presbyter =

1844 novel by Alexandre Herculano

Eurico, the Presbyter (Portuguese: Eurico, o Presbítero) is an 1844 historical novel by Alexandre Herculano. It is about the ending days of the Visigoth kingdom that existed in the Iberian Peninsula, as the Moors invaded it in the 8th century.

== Plot ==
The plot tells of the love of Eurico and Hermengarda, and is set in the Visigoth ruled Iberian Peninsula of the 8th century. Eurico and his friend Teodomiro fight aside the king of Hispania (Spain) Wittiza against rebel mountain people and their allies, the Franks. After winning the battle, Eurico goes to live in a village in the Duchy of Cantabria area, where he falls in love with Hermengarda during a Mass at the local church. Not knowing that she is from royalty, he proposes to her father, Fávila, who is none other than the Duke of Cantabria. He was little better than a knight, the Duke evidently denies his request.

Appalled, Eurico becomes a presbyter in Carteia, for alleviating his pain over Hermengarda through dedication to religious functions and by composing sacred hymns and poems.

An impending invasion by the Moors, led by Tariq, leads him to assume the alias of the enigmatic Dark Knight. Under this guise, Eurico fights the islamic Moors and, through his valour, obtains the admiration of his own people, of the mountaineers and even of the Franks he had defeated before, who ally with him against the new enemy.

When victory is at hand, Sisebuto and Ebas, sons of Witiza, betray their cause, intending to get the Spanish throne. Soon after, Roderic, king of the Visigoths, dies at the Battle of Guadalete and Teodomiro becomes the new leader. The Moors invade the abbey where Hermengarda is kept and kidnap her. The Dark Knight comes to the rescue as the emir was about to dishonour her. After rescuing her, he takes her back to the christian north, to Asturias, where her brother, Pelágio, awaits.

In a cave in Covadonga, Hermengarda finds Eurico and declares her love for him. He knows this love is impossible because of his religious vows, and reveals himself as the Dark Knight. Upon hearing this, Hermengarda becomes insane and Eurico, knowing his obligations, goes to a last stand against the Moors, the renegade Oppa, Bishop of Seville (or Toledo) and the enigmatic berber Count, Juliano of Ceuta.

== See also ==
- Alexandre Herculano
- Moor Invasion of the iberic Peninsula
- Romanticism in Portugal
