= Al-Samh ibn Malik al-Khawlani =

Governor of Al-Andalus from 719 to 721

- السمح بن مالك الخولاني

Governor of Al-Andalus
- In office 719–721
- Preceded by: Al-Hurr ibn Abd al-Rahman al-Thaqafi
- Succeeded by: Abdul Rahman Al Ghafiqi

Personal details
- Died: 721
- Parent: Malik al-Khawlani

Military service
- Battles/wars: Umayyad invasion of Gaul: Battle of Toulouse (721) †

Al-Samh ibn Malik al-Khawlani (Arabic: السمح بن مالك الخولاني) was the Arab governor general of Al-Andalus from between 719 and 721. In 720, under his governorate he minted the first purely Arab coins in Al-Andalus as part of his fiscal reforms.

== Conquest of remaining Visigothic rule ==
On al-Samh's accession to office, the Visigothic king Ardo still held a grip over the Lower Ebro and Septimania. Early on al-Samh captured Barcelona, and also Narbonne (720), extinguishing the vestigial Visigothic kingdom there after leading an Umayyad incursion into current southern France. Besides the above Narbonne, the Arab commander went on to lead a large Arab army into the rest of Visigothic Septimania, besieging a number of towns and cities including Béziers, Agde, Lodève, Maguelonne (Montpellier) and Nîmes.

== Siege and defeat at Toulouse ==
After setting up his headquarters in Narbonne, military moves took an unexpected turn when Al-Samh returned to Al Andalus to gather more Arab troops prior to attacking the strongly defended Aquitanian capital city of Toulouse. While the ultimate reasons remain obscure, it has been argued that Odo provided shelter to Visigothic elites and population fleeing the theater of war around the eastern Pyrenees. Al-Samh returned to Septimania and on to southeastern Aquitaine with a massive army, siege engines, infantry, horsemen and mercenaries. The siege of Toulouse, with its near-impregnable walls, lasted until early summer.

The defenders, short of provisions, were close to breaking when, around June 9, 721, Odo the Great, the duke of Aquitaine, returned at the head of a large Aquitanian and Frankish force, attacking al-Samh's rear and launching a highly successful encircling movement. A major, decisive battle ensued. Caught between the Toulouse defenders and Eudes's men, al-Samh tried to break out, but was trapped with the bulk of his troops in a place that came to be called by Muslim chroniclers Balat al Shuhada ('the path of the martyrs') where he made a determined last stand as his army was decimated by Odo's forces.

Al-Samh himself was critically wounded, and died shortly afterwards in Narbonne.

== Notes ==
Preceded by Al-Hurr ibn Abd al-Rahman al-Thaqafi	Governor of Al-Andalus; 719–721	Succeeded by Abdul Rahman Al Ghafiqi
