= Curse of Kehama =

Poem by Robert Southey composed in 1810

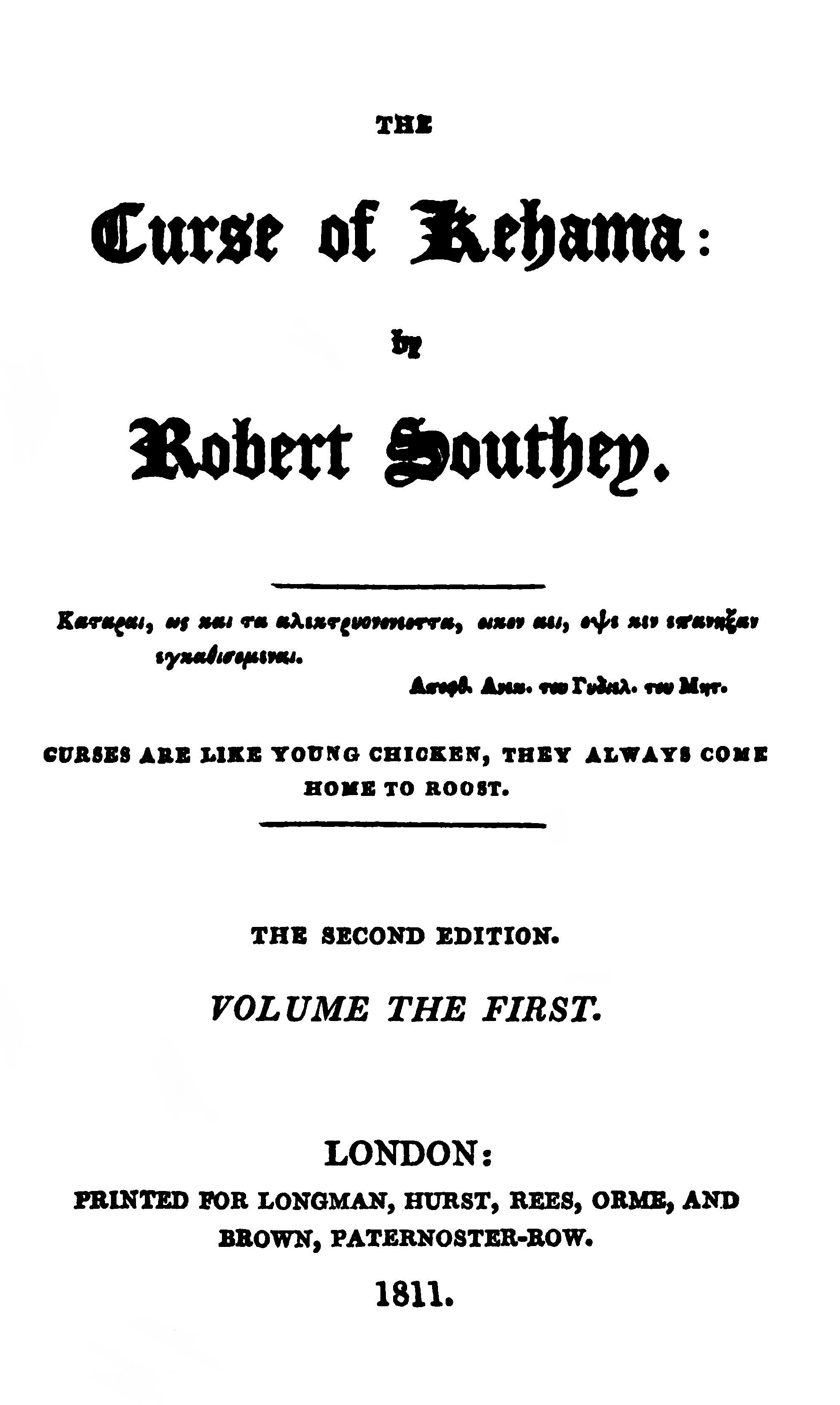
Title page to the 1811 second edition

The Curse of Kehama is an 1810 epic poem composed by Robert Southey. The origins of the poem can be traced to Southey's schoolboy days when he suffered from insomnia, along with his memories of a dark and mysterious schoolmate that later formed the basis for one of the poem's villains. The poem was started in 1802 following the publication of Southey's epic Thalaba the Destroyer. After giving up on the poem for a few years, he returned to it after prompting by the poet Walter Savage Landor encouraged him to complete his work. When it was finally published, it sold more copies than his previous works.

The poem is divided into twelve "books". Its first half describes how the evil priest Kehama is able to gain significant amounts of demonic power in a quest to become a god. This is interrupted when his son Arvalan is killed after attempting to have his way with Kailyal, a peasant girl. After the death of his son, Kehama begins to wage war upon Yamen, the god of death, and curses Ladurlad, his son's killer. However, the curse allows Ladurlad the ability to become a hero of significant strength, and he uses that power to work with the Hindu gods in a quest to defeat Kehama and ensure the safety of Kailyal. Eventually, Ladurlad is able to defeat Kehama and is freed from his curse.

Although the poem describes Hindu myth it is heavily influenced by Zoroastrian theology, and the ideal of a dualistic moral system. Part of Southey's focus on India stems from the recent British colonial expansion into India and the increasing interest by British citizens in Indian culture. Critics gave the work mixed reviews; many praised the quality of the poem's language, but others felt that the plot or choice of subject matter was lacking.

== Background ==
The basis for Southey wishing to write an epic poem came from his private reading of literature while attending Westminster School as a boy. It is possible that Southey, during this time, had problems sleeping and that an inability to sleep served as inspiration for the topic of Kehama. Additionally, a boy Southey met while at school, who looked like a fiend according to Southey's account, served as a prototype for the dark and mysterious character Arvalan. By 1802, Southey spent his time writing the poem along with other projects following the publication of Thalaba the Destroyer. This continued into 1806, when the epic was worked on alongside other works, such as a translation of El Cid and a history of Portugal.

It was not until 1808 that Southey attempted to finish Kehama, which came after him almost abandoning poetry because of the reception of Thalaba and Madoc. In particular, fellow poet Landor encouraged Southey to complete the epic along with writing the work Roderick the Last of the Goths. This effort continued through 1808, and he was able to complete 3,000 lines of the poem. However, he was interrupted in his work at the end of the year by an illness that plagued his family and kept him away from writing for two months. In March 1809, Walter Scott requested Southey to send him some excerpts from the work. Southey complied and the lines were sent for Scott's collection, English Minstrelsy. The poem was finished by 1810 and, by 1811, Kehama was selling more copies than Thalaba sold.

== Poem ==
The poem is twelve books with the first six dealing with various episodes along with introducing Hindu theology. The story describes Kehama, a Brahmin priest, as he makes sacrifices to Shiva to gain power. His scheme is to conquer death and attain Amreeta to become a god himself. Arvalan, Kehama's son, attempts to take Kailyal, a peasant girl. He is stopped by Ladurlad, another peasant, and killed. Kehama decides to war against Yamen, the god of death, while also seeking to torture Ladurlad in revenge. Ladurlad is cursed to be separated from nature and unable to live a human life, which included not being able to sleep. His separation from nature gives him the ability to do what others cannot however.

After this event, Arvalan turns into a demon. Kailyal, while trying to escape from Kehama's wrath, is pushed into a river and was about to drown before Ladurlad comes and saves her. Although he is a hero, Ladurlad cannot bear to be near her, which allows for Arvalan to pursue after Kailyal as she escapes to the temple of Pollear. When she gets there, she is almost poisoned by a poisonous manchineel tree. Before this happens, a gandharvas, or good spirit, named Ereenia takes Kailyal to Casyapa, Father of the Hindu gods. With the help of the Tree of Life at Casyapa's mountain, she is able to be healed. However, Kailyal is sent back because Casyapa is worried about Kehama's power. Kailyal is sent to the land of Indra for safety. While there, she is united with her father and Ladurlad, and they are told of how Vishnu saved humanity by assuming a human form. During this time, Kailyal grows close to Ereenia and they fall in love with each other.

Arvalan turns to Lorrinite, a witch, who is able to find out the location of Ladurlad and Kailyal. After being armed with the witches magic weapons, Arvalan travels to Kailyal's location. He is prevented from reaching the place. However, Kehama completes a ritual at the same time that grants him power and the ability to invade the Hindu first heaven, and Ladurlad and Kailyal flee. They start a new life until a group of individuals kidnap Kailyal to marry her off to the god Juggernaut. During a ritual involving the sacrifice of worshippers, Arvalan possesses various priests who attempt have their way with Kailyal. Ereenia tries to save her, but he is stopped by Lorrinite and taken away. Left with no options, Kailyal attempts suicide by burning herself in a fire. She is rescued by Ladurlad who, because of the curse, is immune to fire.

Ladurlad and Kailyal travel in search of Ereenia and end up in the underwater city of Mahabalipur. Ladurlad goes down into the city and enters into the palace of Baly, the ruler of the city who was a demon that attempted to do the same thing that Kehama is trying to do: overthrow the gods. Ladurlad comes to the Chamber of the Kings of old where he finds Ereenia. After battling against a naga, he is able to rescue Ereenia. By the time they return to Kailyal, they are attacked by Arvalan's servants. Baly appears, as he is allowed to do so once a year, and uses his powers to condemn Arvalan's army to damnation. Kehama, wanting Kailyal for himself, tries to bargain with her and offer to remove Ladurlad's curse. After refusing, Kailyal is given leprosy.

Ereenia sets out to wake up Shiva at Mount Calasay. When he gets there, he rings the Silver Bell and the mountain turns into light followed by a message telling Ereenia to talk to Yamen. Ereenia returns to Kailyal and Ladurlad, and the three travel to the world of the dead, Padalon. They are brought to the city Yamenpur and are able to meet Yamen. After talking to Yamen, they are told to wait, but Kehama attacks Padalon. Kehama defeats Yamen and tries to convince Kailyal to join him. After being rejected again, Kehama attains the Amreeta and becomes immortal. However, the Amreeta gives Kehama an immortality of torment, which reflects Kehama's soul. Shiva comes down and restores Yamen to power. Shiva allows Kailyal to drink the Amreeta, which allows her to become a divine being that can be with Ereenia. Ladurlad is given the ability to die and the poem ends with him entering the paradise Yedillian to be with the other dead.

== Themes ==
Southey was intrigued by the Zend Avesta and in Zoroastrianism. In particular, the aspects of a dualistic moral system along with a focus on death appealed to the poet. He wanted to create a poem based in the ideas and dealing with a Persian prince, but he was unable to write the poem. Instead, he incorporated aspects of it, including how evil allows for the shaping of good, to enter into Kehama. Other theological aspects involved the Hindu pantheon to have an epic with gods that both behind the scenes and directly within the story of the epic. The evil discussed in the poem had a contemporary and political model. It paralleled Southey's belief that Napoleon was becoming an Antichrist figure who would set up a reverse millennium.

The poem's focus on Hinduism became an important topic to Southey because of the British colonial interest in India. He was advised by William Taylor that focusing on India would allow for the work to become popular as the Empire became greater. The poem also marks the shift in view of the "exotic" from China to India and the appeal the religion started to hold. This transition was furthered by the translations of William Jones of Sanskrit along with possible connections between Hinduism and other theological traditions including Christianity. Southey knew of various translations and read Shakuntala (from the Mahabharata) and the Bhagavad Gita, which helped to form a basis for his knowledge of India. His rationalism kept Southey from accepting many of the beliefs he considered superstitious. Instead he wished to hide what he thought were deformities, to promote his own view.

== Critical reception ==
In a poem on Southey, Landor praised his friend, "In Thalaba, Kehama and Roderick the most inventive Poet/ In lighter compositions the most diversified." An anonymous review in the February 1811 Monthly Mirror claimed "The plot is ... powerfully spirit-stirring, but not interesting ... because it is utterly impossible for the feelings to travel with the persons of a drama so constituted as the present ... It seems Mr. Southey labours under a great disadvantage, through the choice of his machinery." It continued, "Having given this opinion, we are now free to confess that the poet's art is, in the terrific, prodigiously displayed throughout, and we have no doubt that if Mr. Southey's love of eccentricity had not overcome his better taste, he would have chosen such a machinery, and so conducted his story, as not only to have agitated the nerves, but to have come home to heart, and rested there. Being what it is, however, we pronounce it a splendid specimen of a daring poetical imagination, fed and supported by vast sources of knowledge and observation."

This was followed by an anonymous review in the March 1811 The Critical Review that argued: "The Curse of Kehama is a performance of precisely this violent and imposing description. Like the shield of Atlante, it strikes dead everything that is opposed to it; one might as well hold a farthering candle to the sun, as to think of placing Homer, or Shakspeare, or Milton or Dante, by the side of it. But it is the false blaze of enchantment, not the steady radiance of truth and nature; and if you gain courage to look at it a second or third time, the magic has lost its power, and you only wonder what it was that dazzled you." The review continued, "we think there is quite enough to discover to us how great a poet Mr. Southey might be, were the single gift of judgment to be added to the qualities which he undoubtedly possesses. Till then, we fear that we shall never be able to subscribe to the belief in a Trinity of living poets, of whom Mr. S. is represented as entitled to the foremost honours."

John Foster wrote a review for the April 1811 Eclectic Review which said, "We must repeat then, in the first place, our censure of the adoption or creation of so absurd a fable" and "The next chief point of censure would be, that this absurdity is also paganism; but this has been noticed so pointedly and repeatedly in our analysis, that a very few words here will suffice." In an analysis of other aspects, Foster argued, "The general diction of the work is admirably strong, and various, and free; and, in going through it, we have repeatedly exulted in the capabilities of the English language. The author seems to have in a great measure grown out of that affected simplicity of expression, of which he has generally been accused. The versification, as to measure and rhyme, is a complete defiance of all rule, and all example ... This is objectionable, chiefly, as it allows the poet to riot away in a wild wantonness of amplification". An anonymous review in the June 1811 Literary Panorama stated, "If we were desired to name a poet whose command of language enables him to express in the most suitable and energetic terms the images which agitate his mind, we should name Mr. Southey; if we were requested to point out a poem which to freedom of manner in the construction of its stanzas, united a condensation of phrase, with a happy collocation of words, thereby producing force, we should recommend Kehama".

Ernest Bernhardt-Kabish, in 1977, claimed that "The Curse of Kehama is a striking poem" and that the poem was "better constructed than the preceding ones". However, he argued that the poem's ending was "too crass in its situation and too facile in its resolution to succeed fully even as a moral allegory."

Sir Granville Bantock, who made a symphonic poem out of Southey's Thalaba, planned to do a symphonic poem based on The Curse of Kehama, but only completed two orchestral scenes.
