= Achila II =

8th-century king of the Visigoths

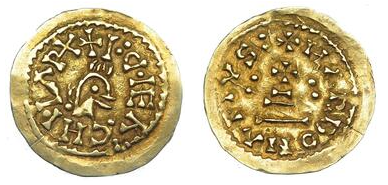
- Tremissis of Achila II minted in Narbonne, on the obverse we can read +I D IEA CHI IAPX and on the reverse NARBONA PIVS

King of the Visigoths
- Reign: 710/711 – 714
- Predecessor: Wittiza/Roderic
- Successor: Ardo
- Died: c. 714; Visigothic Kingdom

Achila II (also spelled Agila, (Note: In Spanish, sometimes Ágila.) Aquila, or Akhila; died c. 714) was the Visigothic king of Hispania and Septimania from 710 or 711 until his death. The kingdom he ruled was restricted to the northeast of the old Hispanic kingdom on account of the Arabo-Berber invasions.

Achila's reign is known solely from coins and regnal lists and is not mentioned by reliable narrative histories. Gold coins of Achila's have been found bearing the inscriptions of the mints of Girona, Zaragoza, Tarragona, and Narbonne. Because the narrative sources, the numismatics, and the regnal lists all confirm the reign of Roderic during the same years as Achila, it is almost doubtless that the two were kings in opposition to each other following Roderic's coup, which may have resulted either in or from the death of the previous king, Wittiza.

There are more coins surviving from Achila's kingdom than Roderic's, but the findings do not overlap in territory and it is suspected that the kingdom had been divided between two factions, with the southwest (the provinces of Lusitania and western Carthaginiensis around the capital Toledo) following (or being subjected to) Roderic and the northeast (Tarraconensis and Narbonensis) falling under the rule of Achila. It is unknown to whom the provinces of Gallaecia and Baetica fell. Roderic and Achila never appear to have come into military conflict; this is probably best explained by the preoccupation of Roderic with Arab raids and not to a formal division of the kingdom.

Two continuations of the Chronicon Regum Visigothorum record Achila's reign of three years following immediately upon Wittiza's. It has even been suggested by some scholars that Achila was in fact Wittiza's son and successor and that Roderic had tried to usurp the throne from him, even that he had been a co-ruler with Wittiza since 708. Any son of Wittiza would have been a child in 711. Achila's reign probably began shortly after Roderic's and lasted until 713 or 714.

During Achila's brief reign, Arab raids began to plague the south of Hispania, where Roderic ruled. Roderic tried to defeat them but was killed in the attempt. Some supporters of Achila may have deserted Roderic on his final campaign. Because of the oppressive policy of his predecessors towards the Jews and the large Jewish population of Narbonensis and because of what he stood to gain should Roderic be removed, military historian Bernard Bachrach has written that "[t]here is a temptation to conclude that the Muslims, King Achila, and the Jews all joined together, at least temporarily, to overthrow Roderic."

It is possible that an ecclesiastic named Oppa was declared king at Toledo by rivals of both Roderic and Achila, either before Roderic's defeat and death at the Battle of the Guadalete or between his death and the Arab capture of Toledo. Whatever the case, almost all of Hispania save Gallaecia, the Asturias, the country of the Basques, and the valley of the Ebro had fallen to the Arabs within a couple years of Roderic's death. In 713 the Arabs and their Berber allies began the conquest of the Ebro valley, taking Zaragoza. These events coincide with the end of Achila's three-year reign and may have accounted for his death in battle with the invaders. The nature of the discovery of a smattering of coins at El Bovalar near Lleida shows that El Bovalar probably fell and was razed by the invaders in 714.

Achila was succeeded by Ardo, who only reigned in Narbonensis north of the Pyrenees and probably died in the Arab invasion of that region in 721.

== Sources ==
- Bachrach, Bernard S. "A Reassessment of Visigothic Jewish Policy, 589–711." The American Historical Review, Vol. 78, No. 1. (Feb., 1973), pp 11–34.
- Collins, Roger. The Arab Conquest of Spain, 710–97. Oxford University Press, 1989.
- Collins, Roger. Visigothic Spain, 409–711. Blackwell Publishing, 2004.
- Hodgkin, Thomas. "Visigothic Spain." The English Historical Review, Vol. 2, No. 6. (Apr., 1887), pp 209–234.
- Shaw, Dykes. "The Fall of the Visigothic Power in Spain." The English Historical Review, Vol. 21, No. 82. (Apr., 1906), pp 209–228.
- Thompson, E. A. The Goths in Spain. Oxford: Clarendon Press, 1969.

Regnal titles
Preceded by Wittiza	King of the Visigoths; 711–714 in opposition to Roderic	Succeeded by Ardo
