= Abd al-Aziz ibn Musa =

First governor of Al-Andalus

Abd al-Aziz ibn Musa ibn Nusayr (Arabic: عبد العزيز بن موسى) was an Arab general and the first governor of Al-Andalus, in modern-day Spain and Portugal. He was the son of Musa ibn Nusayr, the Umayyad governor of Ifriqiya. ‘Abd al-Aziz had a long history of political and military involvement along with his father.

== Early life ==
‘Abd al-Aziz accompanied his father in 712 to aid the Umayyad general, Tariq, in the Umayyad conquest of Hispania. The conquest of the area was progressing smoothly under Tariq, Musa ibn Nusayr and ‘Abd al-Aziz. With the success of the conquest apparent, Tariq and Musa ibn Nusayr were called back to Syria by the Umayyad caliph, Al Waleed, in 714. ‘Abd al-Aziz was given the governorship of Al-Andalus by his father. Musa ibn Nusayr, upon his return to Damascus, fell into disfavour with the caliph and ended his days in Medina as an “old and broken man.” ‘Musa ibn Nusayr outlived his son, ‘Abd al-Aziz.

== Conquest and reign of Al-Andalus ==
‘Abd al-Aziz chose the town of Seville as his capital city. Seville, located in the modern day province of Andalucía in southern Spain on the Guadalquivir River. Under ‘Abd al-Aziz’s leadership after the departure of his father and Tariq, Islamic power, in what came to be known as Al-Andalus, expanded into modern day Portugal in the west and the sub-Pyrenean regions in the north. In one of the newly conquered lands, ‘Abd al-Aziz signed a peace treaty with the Visigothic lord of Murcia, Theudimer. His name in Arabic is Tudmir. The treaty, known as the Treaty of Tudmir, gave Visigothic Christians the right to continue to practise their religion, as long as they paid a special tax and remained loyal to their Muslim overlords.

== Personal life and influences ==
‘Abd al-Aziz remained in power and even married the widow Egilona, the wife of the last Visigothic king, Roderic. Egilona took the name Umm ‘Asim upon her marriage. In his marriage to Egilona, ‘Abd al-Aziz set a trend of espousing local Visigothic women, due to the absence of Arab and Berber women. This lack was because Arab and Berber women did not accompany the army into Al-Andalus at the beginning of the conquest of Hispania. The practice of taking conquered women as wives almost became a general rule for conquering Muslim leaders. Egilona's influence over ‘Abd al-Aziz was not common. Some felt that she held too much influence and sway over ‘Abd al-Aziz . Egilona coaxed ‘Abd al-Aziz to wear a crown, and lower entrance ways to promote veneration of him and people bowing to him. Egilona even had ‘Abd al-Aziz make the entrance to his audience chamber lower, so that upon entering, he would be bowing to her. These links to the Visigothic royalty and the influence of Egilona led to the misconception and rumors that ‘Abd al-Aziz had converted to Christianity. These rumours even reached the Umayyad Caliph Sulaymān in Damascus. Troubled by these rumours, the caliph ordered ‘Abd al-Aziz to be killed. It is very likely, however, that these were rumours instigated at the behest of the hostile faction led by Habib ibn Abi Ubayda al-Fihri, which eventually killed ‘Abd al-Aziz. Certainly, ‘Abd al-Aziz had a reputation as a righteous Muslim before these rumours that did not support this theory.

== Assassination and Al-Andalus afterwards ==
Sources differ on the year, but ‘Abd al-Aziz was assassinated by Ziyad ibn ‘Udhra al-Balawi on order of the Caliph Sulayman. However, Ibn Khaldun reports the order was received and carried out by Habib ibn Abi Ubayda al-Fihri. The caliph feared that he wanted to establish his own personal monarchy in Al-Andalus, separate from the Umayyad caliphate based in Damascus. Dates of his assassination vary between the years 715, 716, and 718. ‘Abd al-Aziz was beheaded in the monastery of Santa Rufina, used during the time as a mosque. After his death, ‘Abd al-Aziz’s head was brought to Damascus and displayed publicly to an audience where the caliph knew that his father, Musa ibn Nusayr, was in attendance.

‘Abd al-Aziz was succeeded by his cousin, Ayyub ibn Habib al-Lakhmi, who is thought to have played a role in his assassination. His tenure as governor did not last long and for a period of forty years following his assassination, Al-Andalus was filled with chaos and turmoil. Rival Arab factions continuously fought to gain power, and also to expand Islamic control in the area. Governors were appointed or chosen, but they were often deposed by rival groups or by the Umayyad caliph in Damascus. This pattern continued at least until 756, when an independent Umayyad emirate was established in Córdoba. However, Abd-ar-Rahman I still found much resistance in Al-Andalus (Toledo, Zaragoza, Barcelona ... ) and had to struggle still 25 years for a total mastery over the territory. Islamic power remained in the region until 1492, when Ferdinand and Isabella conquered the Islamic Emirate of Granada.

Preceded by Musa bin Nusair	Governor of Al-Andalus; 714–716	Succeeded by Ayyub ibn Habib al-Lakhmi
