= Ardo =

8th-century king of the Visigoths

- King of Hispania, Septimania and Gallaecia

King of the Visigoths
- Reign: 713/714 – 720/721
- Predecessor: Achila II
- Successor: Title abolished
- Died: 720/721

Ardo (or Ardonus, possibly short for Ardabastus; died 720/721) is the last attested king of the Visigoths, reigning from 713 or 714 until his death in 720 or 721. The Visigothic Kingdom was already severely reduced in power and area at the time he succeeded Achila II, and his dominions probably did not extend beyond Septimania and present-day Catalonia, due to the Arab conquests of the previous three years.

Ardo is only recorded in one Visigothic regnal list as reigning for seven years. As of 716 the Arabs crossed over the Pyrenees and invaded Narbonensis, the last province under Gothic control. Over the next three years Ardo probably defended what remained of the Visigothic kingdom and he "may have gone down fighting like his predecessor" after the Arabs took Narbonne and before they conquered all that remained of the old kingdom.

If Ardo is to be identified with Ardobastus, then he survived the invasion and negotiated a treaty, wherein he represented Christians as the Count of the Christians of al-Andalus. This title would pass to a number of individuals until the tenth century at least. Other counts included: Rabî’ ibn Theodulph, Abû Sa’îd al-Qûmis, (a descendant of Ardabastus) and Mu’âwiya ibn Lubb.

== Bibliography ==
- Thompson, E. A. The Goths in Spain. Oxford: Clarendon Press, 1969.
- Collins, Roger. The Arab Conquest of Spain, 710–97. Blackwell Publishing, 1989.
- Collins, Roger. Visigothic Spain, 409–711. Blackwell Publishing, 2004.
- Història de Catalunya. Barcelona: El Periodico, 1992.

Regnal titles
Preceded by Achila II	King of the Visigoths; 714–720	defunct
