= Egilona =

Visigothic noblewoman

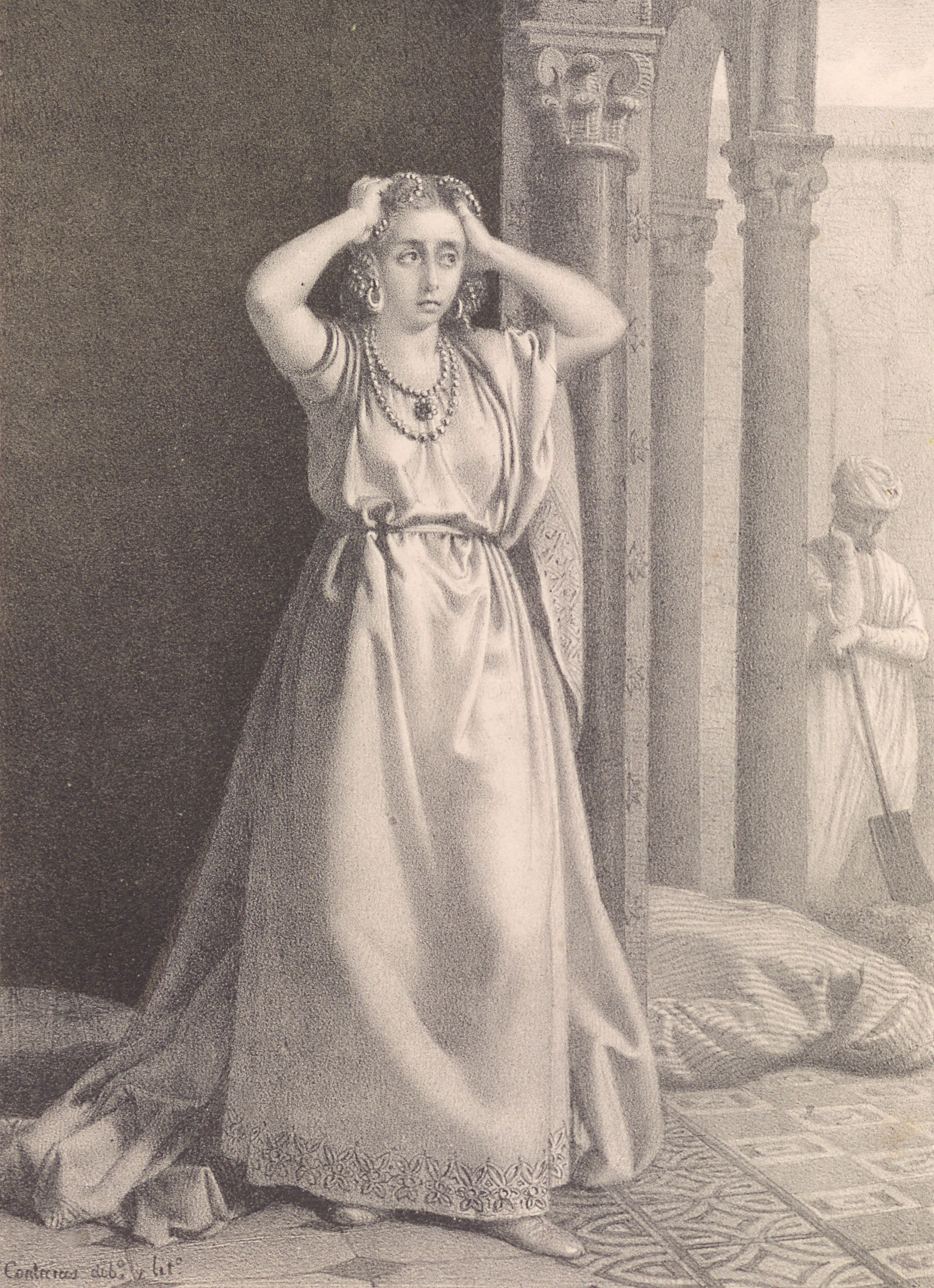
Egilona, as depicted in Mugeres célebres de España y Portugal ("Celebrated Women of Spain and Portugal"), 1868. AB195 0203 (cropped)

Egilona (or Egilo) was a Visigothic noblewoman and the last known queen of the Visigoths. She was the wife first of Roderic, the Visigothic king (710–11), and then of ʿAbd al-ʿAzīz, Muslim governor (wālī) of al-Andalus (714–16). Her name is rendered Aylū by Arabic writers, who also give her the kunya Umm ʿAṣim ("mother of ʿAṣim"). She was independently wealthy.

== Biography ==
Egilona may have been related to Kings Egica and Wittiza. Since the succession of 710 was contested, Roderic may have married Egilona to strengthen his position. Their marriage did not last long, as he died at the Battle of the Guadalete the following year.

The date of Egilona's second marriage is uncertain. She may have married ʿAbd al-ʿAzīz before he became governor, when he was still merely the son of the conquering general, Mūsā bin Nuṣayr, who had overthrown the Visigothic kingdom. Like her marriage to Roderic, she was married to ʿAbd al-ʿAzīz as a way to cement his status as governor. There is no reference in the sources to Egilona converting to Islam, and scholars are divided on whether she actually converted or not. Although both Arabic and Latin sources depict Egilona and her second husband as communicating directly, it is not clear whether they could have done so directly, since Egilona would have spoken a vulgar Latin dialect and did not likely have time or reason to learn Arabic quickly. Likewise, ʿAbd al-ʿAzīz could have had little reason to learn Latin, although he was criticised for certain foreign (ʿajamī) practices.

Both Christian and Muslims sources make her responsible for the governor's assassination, and there is no reason to doubt the general portrayal of her role. The Christian Chronicle of 754 records that:

"on the advice of Queen Egilona, wife of the late king Roderic, whom he had joined to himself, [ʿAbd al-ʿAzīz] tried to throw off the Arab yoke from his neck and retain the conquered kingdom of Iberia for himself."

The ninth-century Muslim historian ʿAbd al-Ḥakam, on the other hand, says that he ʿAbd al-ʿAzīz was killed because Egilona "had made him a Christian". This seems unlikely, since he took refuge in a mosque and recited from the Koran when attacked. Al-Ḥakam does corroborate the Chronicle of 754's claim that Egilona stoked his royal ambitions, urging him to act so as to attain the respect her first husband had. The Akhbār majmūʿa of 858 even claims that Egilona had a crown made out of her own jewels and forced her husband to wear it on the grounds that "a king without a crown is a king without a kingdom". She also tried to have his men perform acts of obeisance to him in Seville.

== Fiction ==
Egilona's life and legend have been given dramatic treatment several times in the modern era. In 1760, Cándido María Trigueros published the play La Egilona, viuda del rey don Rodrigo. In 1785, Antontio Valladares de Sotomayor staged a similar play that has been called by the same title, La Egilona, viuda del rey don Rodrigo. In 1788, an anonymous play entitled La Egilona, drama heroica en prosa was put on during the coronation ceremonies of Charles IV. In 1845, the Cuban playwright Gertrudis Gómez de Avellaneda published a play titled Egilona.
