= Alexandre Herculano =

Portuguese writer, poet, journalist (1810 - 1877)

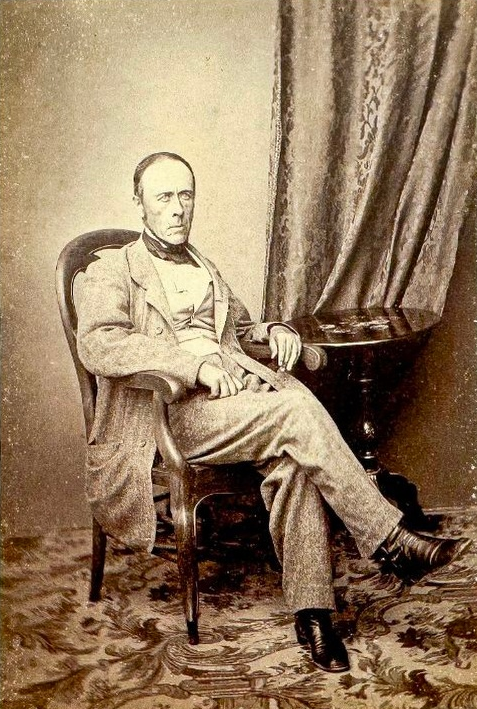
- Portrait, c. 19th century
- Born: Alexandre Herculano de Carvalho e Araújo; 28 March 1810; Lisbon, Kingdom of Portugal
- Died: 13 September 1877 (aged 67); Santarém, Kingdom of Portugal
- Resting place: Jerónimos Monastery
- Occupations: Novel writer, poet, journalist, historian, politician
- Writing career
- Language: Portuguese
- Genres: Historical novel, Romantic poetry
- Notable works: Eurico, o Presbítero, O Monge de Cister, História de Portugal de Alexandre Herculano, História da Origem e Estabelecimento da Inquisição em Portugal
- Movement: Romanticism

Alexandre Herculano de Carvalho e Araújo (European Portuguese: [ɐlɨˈʃɐ̃dɾ(ɨ) eɾkuˈlɐnu]; 28 March 1810 – 13 September 1877) was a Portuguese novelist and historian.

== Early life ==
Herculano's family had humble origins. One of his grandfathers was a foreman stonemason in the royal employ. Herculano received his early education, comprising Latin, logic and rhetoric, at the Necessidades Monastery, and spent a year at the Royal Marine Academy studying mathematics with the intention of entering on a commercial career. In 1828 Portugal fell under the absolute rule of D. Miguel, and Herculano, becoming involved in the unsuccessful military pronunciamento of August 1831, had to leave Portugal clandestinely and take refuge in England and France. In 1832 he accompanied the Liberal expedition to Terceira Island as a volunteer, and was one of D. Pedro's famous army of 7,500 men who landed at Mindelo and occupied Porto. He took part in all the actions of the great siege, and at the same time served as a librarian in the city archives. He published his first volume of verses, A Voz de Propheta, in 1832, and two years later another entitled A Harpa do Crente.

Privation had made a man of him, and in these little books he proves himself a poet of deep feeling and considerable power of expression. The stirring incidents in the political emancipation of Portugal inspired his muse, and he describes the bitterness of exile, the adventurous expedition to Terceira, the heroic defence of Porto, and the final combats of liberty. In 1837 he founded the Panorama in imitation of the English Penny Magazine, and there and in Illustração he published the historical tales which were afterwards collected into Lendas e Narrativas; in the same year he became royal librarian at the Ajuda Palace, which enabled him to continue his studies of the past. The Panorama had a large circulation and influence, and Herculano's biographical sketches of great men and his articles of literary and historical criticism did much to educate the middle class by acquainting them with the story of their nation, and with the progress of knowledge and the state of letters in foreign countries.

== Writings ==
After spending his early years as a poet, Herculano introduced the historical novel into Portugal in 1844 by a book written in imitation of Walter Scott. Eurico treats of the fall of the Visigothic monarchy and the beginnings of resistance in the Asturias which gave birth to the Christian kingdoms of the Iberian Peninsula. A second book, Monge de Cister, published in 1848, describes the time of King João I, when the middle class and the municipalities first asserted their power and elected a king who stood in opposition to the nobility.

From an artistic standpoint, these stories are rather laboured productions, besides being ultra-romantic in tone; but they were written mainly with an educational goal, and, moreover, they deserve high praise for their style. Herculano had greater book-learning than Scott, but lacked descriptive talent and skill in dialogue. His touch is heavy, and these novels show no dramatic power, which accounts for his failure as a playwright, but their influence was as great as their followers were many.

=== Chronicles and Histories ===
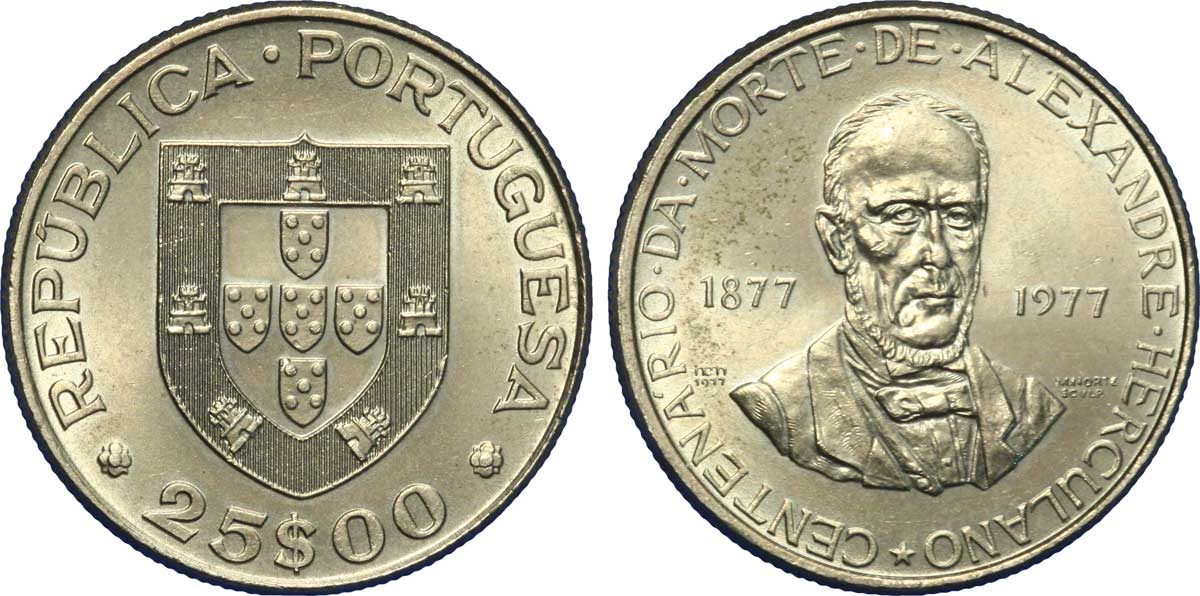
Alexandre Herculano

These and editions of two old chronicles, the "Chronicle of Dom Sebastião" (1839) and the "Annals of king João III" (1844), prepared Herculano for his life's work, and the year 1846 saw the first volume of his "History of Portugal from the Beginning of the Monarchy to the end of the Reign of Afonso III", a book written on critical lines and based on documents.

The difficulties he encountered in producing it were very great, for the foundations had been ill-prepared by his predecessors, and he was obliged to be artisan and architect at the same time. He had to collect manuscripts from all parts of Portugal, decipher, classify and weigh them before he could begin work, and then he found it necessary to break with precedents and destroy traditions. Serious students in Portugal and abroad welcomed the book as an historical work of the first rank, for its evidence of careful research, its able marshalling of facts, its scholarship and its painful accuracy, while the sculptural simplicity of the style and the correctness of the diction made it a Portuguese classic. The second volume of his history appeared in 1847, the third in 1849, and the fourth in 1853.

=== Historiographic controversy ===
The first volume, however, gave rise to a celebrated controversy, because Herculano had reduced the famous battle of Ourique, which was supposed to have seen the birth of the Portuguese monarchy, to the dimensions of a mere skirmish, and denied the apparition of Christ to King Afonso, a fable first circulated in the 15th century.

Herculano was denounced from the pulpit and by the press for his lack of patriotism and piety, and after bearing the attack for some time his pride drove him to reply. In a letter to the cardinal patriarch of Lisbon entitled Eu e o Clero (1850), he denounced the fanaticism and ignorance of the clergy in plain terms, and this provoked a fierce pamphlet war marked by much personal abuse. A professor of Arabic in Lisbon intervened to sustain the accepted view of the battle, and charged Herculano and his supporter, Pascual de Gayangos with ignorance of the Arab historians and of their language. The conduct of the controversy, which lasted some years, did credit to none of the contending parties, but Herculano's statement of the facts was eventually universally accepted as correct.

=== History of the Inquisition ===
In his youth, the excesses of absolutism had made Herculano a Liberal, and the attacks on his history turned this man, full of sentiment and deep religious conviction, into an anti-clerical who began to distinguish between political Catholicism and Christianity. His "History of the Origin and Establishment of the Inquisition in Portugal" (1854–1855), relating the thirty years' struggle between King John III and the Jews—he to establish the tribunal and they to prevent him—was compiled, as the preface showed, to stem the ultramontane reaction, but nonetheless carried weight because it was a recital of events with little or no comment or evidence of passion in its author.

Next to these two books ("History of Portugal from the beginning of the monarchy to the end of the reign of Afonso III" and "History of the origin and establishment of the Inquisition in Portugal"), his study, "Condition of the working classes on the peninsula from the seventh to the twelfth century" ("Do Estado das classes servas na Peninsula desde o VII. até o XII. seculo"), was Herculano's most valuable contribution to history.

=== Retirement ===
In 1856 Herculano began editing a series of Portugalliae monumenta historica, but personal differences between him and the keeper of the Archives, which he necessarily frequented, interrupted his historical studies. On the death of his friend King Pedro V, Herculano left the Ajuda and retired to a country house near Santarém.

The alliance of Liberalism and Catholicism, represented by Herculano and his fellow poetic historians Chateaubriand and Lamartine had ended as the movement known as Ultramontanism grew within the Catholic hierarchy after the Revolutions of 1848. Disillusioned with mankind and despairing of the future of his country, Herculano rarely emerged from his retirement; when he did so, it was to fight political and religious reactionaries. Herculano defended Portugal's monastic orders (advocating their reform rather than suppression) and successfully opposed the entry of foreign religious orders. He supported the rural clergy and idealized the village priest in his Pároco da Aldeia, an imitation, unconscious or otherwise, of Oliver Goldsmith's "The Vicar of Wakefield". Herculano also opposed the Concordat of February 21, 1857, between Portugal and the Holy See, regulating the Portuguese Padroado in the East. Herculano supported civil marriage, although his "Studies on Civil Marriage" ("Estudos sobre o Casamento Civil") was banned (put on the Index Librorum Prohibitorum). English historian Lord Acton and German historian Ignaz von Döllinger experienced similar problems, especially as they all fought the new dogmas of the Immaculate Conception (1854) and papal infallibility (1871). Other key documents issued by Pius IX during the ecclesiastical retrenchment include the Syllabus of Errors (1864) and Etsi multa (1873).

== Political legacy ==
In the domain of letters he remained until his death a veritable pontiff, and an article or book of his was an event celebrated from one end of Portugal to the other. The nation continued to look up to him for intellectual leadership, but, in his later years, lacking hope himself, he could not stimulate others or use to advantage the powers conferred upon him. In politics he remained a constitutional Liberal of the old type, and, for him, the people were the middle classes in opposition to the lower, which he saw to have been the supporters of tyranny in all ages, while he considered radicalism to mean a return via anarchy to absolutism. However, though he conducted political propaganda campaigns in the press in his early days, Herculano never exercised much influence in politics.

== Character ==
His writings include a short description of a crossing from Jersey to Granville, in which he satirizes English character and customs. A rare capacity for tedious work, a dour Catonian rectitude, a passion for truth, pride, irritation when criticized, and independence of character are the marks of Herculano as a man.

His remains lie in a tomb in the Jerónimos Monastery at Belém, near Lisbon, which was raised by public subscription. His more important works have gone through many editions, and his name is still one to reckon with when considering modern historians of Portugal and of the Iberian peninsula.

== Family life ==
In 1866, Herculano married Mariana Hermínia de Meira, born around 1830, whom he had first fallen in love with at the age of 26. At the time, he decided to prioritize his literary ambitions over this relationship, a choice he later described as a sacrifice. He explained in a letter to his friend Joaquim Filipe de Soure that he wanted someone to care for him in his old age and that he never wished to have children, believing it incompatible with his work. In his correspondence, Herculano often mentioned Mariana, including updates about her health, which reflected his ongoing concern for her well-being. These references contrasted with his otherwise formal tone and demonstrated a degree of tenderness in their relationship.

== Principal works ==
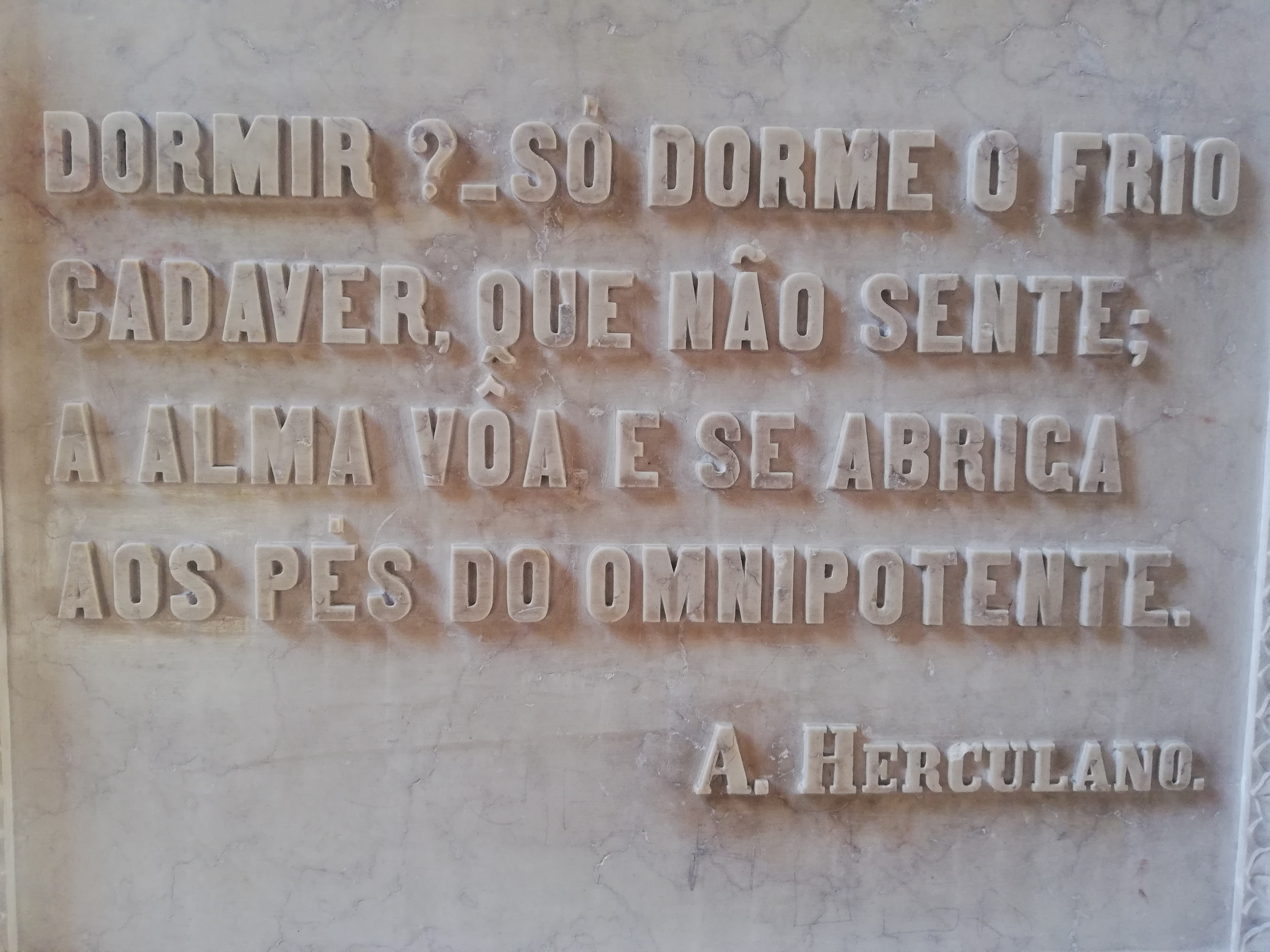
A piece of Herculano's poetry engraved on his tomb: "Sleep? Only the cold, unfeeling corpse sleeps; the soul flies, and finds shelter at the feet of the Almighty."

=== Poetry ===
- The Voice of the Prophet (A Voz do Profeta) 1836
- The Believer's Harp (A Harpa do Crente) 1838
- Poems (Poesias) 1850

=== Theatre ===
- The Frontier of Africa, or Three Nights of Heartburn (O Fronteiro de África ou três noites aziagas) A drama based on Portuguese history, in three acts, staged in Lisbon, in 1838, at the Salitre Theatre, revived in Rio de Janeiro in 1862
- The Princes in Ceuta (Os Infantes em Ceuta) 1842

=== Novels ===
- The Village Parson (O Pároco de Aldeia) 1851
- The Galician: Life, Sayings, and Deeds of Lázaro Tomé (O Galego: Vida, ditos e feitos de Lázaro Tomé)

=== Historical novels, novellas and short stories ===
- The Jester (O Bobo) 1828–1843
- The Monasticon (‘’O Monasticon’’) duology:
  - Eurico, the Presbyter: Visigoth Era (Eurico, o Presbítero: Época Visigótica) 1844
  - The Monk of Cister; in the time of João I (O Monge de Cister; Época de D. João I) 1848, 2 volumes
- Legends and Narratives (Lendas e narrativas) 1851, collection of novellas and short stories
  - Legends and Narratives, Volume 1 (Lendas e narrativas, 1.^{o} tomo) 1851
    - The Qaid of Santarém (O Alcaide de Santarém 950–961)
    - Médsceatt by Charter of Spain (Arras por Foro de Espanha, archaic Portuguese for "Fee by Charter of Spain", 1371–2)
    - The Castle of Faria (O Castelo de Faria 1373)
    - The Vaulted Ceiling (A Abóbada 1401)
  - Legends and Narratives, Volume 2 (Lendas e narrativas, 2.^{o} tomo) 1851
    - Destruction of Auria: Spanish Legends (8th century) (Destruição de Áuria: Lendas Espanholas (século VIII))
    - The Black Bishop (O Bispo Negro 1130)
    - The Death of the Toiler (A Morte do Lidador 1170)
    - The Emprazado: Chronicle of Spain (O Emprazado: Crónica de Espanha 1312)
    - The Assassinated Master: Chronicle of the Templars (O Mestre Assassinado: Crónica dos Templários 1320)
    - Master Gil: A Chronicle of the Fifteenth Century (Mestre Gil: Crónica (Século XV))
    - Three Months in Calcutta: First Account of the Indian States, 1498 (Três Meses em Calecut: Primeira Crónica dos Estados da Índia, 1498)
    - The Chronicler: To live and believe in another time (O Cronista: Viver e Crer de Outro Tempo)

=== Histories ===
- "History of Portugal from the beginning of the monarchy to the end of the reign of Afonso III" (História de Portugal: 1.^{a} época, desde an origem da monarquia até D. Afonso III) 1846–1853
- "History of the origin and establishment of the Inquisition in Portugal" (História da Origem e Estabelecimento da Inquisição em Portugal) 1854–1859
- Historical Monuments of Portugal (Portugaliae Monumenta Historica) 1856–1873

=== Pamphlets ===
- Pamphlets: Public Questions, Volume 1 (Opúsculos: Questões Públicas, Tomo I)
  - The Voice of the Prophet (A Voz do Profeta) 1837
  - Theatre, Ethics, Censorship (Teatro, Moral, Censura) 1841
  - The Exits (Os Egressos) 1842
  - On the Economic System (Da Instituição das Caixas Económicas) 1844
  - The Nuns of Lorvão (As Freiras de Lorvão) 1853
  - The Condition of the Church's Records of the Kingdom (Do Estado dos Arquivos Eclesiásticos do Reino) 1857
  - The Suppression of Lectures in the Barracks (A Supressão das Conferências do Casino) 1871
- Pamphlets: Public Questions, Volume 2 (Opúsculos: Questões Públicas, Tomo II)
  - Patriotic Monuments (Monumentos Pátrios) 1838
  - On Intellectual Property (Da Propriedade Literária) 1851–1852
  - Letter to the Academy of Sciences (Carta à Academia das Ciências) 1856
  - Mousinho da Silveira 1856
  - Letter to the Members of the Cintra Club (Carta aos Eleitores do Círculo de Cintra) 1858
  - Manifest of the Popular Association for the Advancement of Education of Women (Manifesto da Associação Popular Promotora da Educação do Sexo Feminino) 1858
- Pamphlets: Controversies and Historical Studies, Volume 1 (Opúsculos: Controvérsias e Estudos Históricos, Tomo I)
  - The Battle of Ourique (A Batalha de Ourique):
    - I. Me and the Clergy (Eu e o Clero) 1850
    - II. Peaceful Considerations (Considerações Pacificas) 1850
    - III. Solemn Words (Solemnia Verba) 1850
    - IV. Solemn Words (Solemnia Verba) 1850
    - V. The Science of an Arab Academic (A Ciência Arábico-Académica) 1851
  - "Condition of the working classes on the peninsula from the seventh to the twelfth century" (Do estado das classes servas na Península, desde o VIII até o XII Século) 1858
- Pamphlets: Public Questions, Volume 3 (Opúsculos: Questões Públicas, Tomo III)
  - The Ties that Bind (Os Vínculos) 1856
  - Immigration (A Emigração) 1870–1875
- Pamphlets: Controversies and Historical Studies, Volume 2 (Opúsculos: Controvérsias e Estudos Históricos, Tomo II)
  - Portuguese historians (Historiadores portugueses) 1839–1840:
    - Fernão Lopes
    - Gomes Eanes de Azurara
    - Vasco Fernandes de Lucena and Rui de Pina
    - Garcia de Resende
  - Letters about the History of Portugal (Cartas Sobre a História de Portugal) 1842
  - Answer to the Criticisms of Vilhena Saldanha (Resposta às Censuras de Vilhena Saldanha) 1846
  - Letter to the Editor of the Universal Review (Carta ao Redactor da Revista Universal)
  - On the Existence and non-Existence of Feudalism in Portugal (Da Existência e não Existência do Feudalismo em Portugal) 1875–1877
  - Explanations (Esclarecimentos):
    - A. Gothic Destinies (Sortes Góticas)
    - B. Feudalism (Feudo)
- Pamphlets: Controversies and Historical Studies, Volume 4 (Opúsculos: Controvérsias e Estudos Históricos, Tomo IV)
  - An Old Newtown (Uma Vila-Nova Antiga)
  - Random Thoughts about an Obscure Man (Cogitações Soltas de um Homem Obscuro)
  - Portuguese Archeology (Arqueologia Portuguesa):
    - The Adventure of Cardinal Alexandrino (Viagem de Cardeal Alexandrino);
    - Characteristic of Lisbon (Aspecto de Lisboa);
    - The Adventure of Two Knights (Viagem dos Cavaleiros Tron e Lippomani)
  - A Little Light in the Thick Darkness (Pouca luz em muitas trevas)
  - Notes on the History of Royal Virtue (Apontamentos para a historia dos bens da coroa)
- Pamphlets: Public Questions, Volume 4 (Opúsculos: Questões Públicas, Tomo IV)
  - Two Eras and Two Monuments, or the Royal Farm at Mafra (Duas Épocas e Dois Monumentos ou a Granja Real de Mafra)
  - Brief Thoughts on Some Aspects of the Farm Economy (Breves Reflexões Sobre Alguns Pontos de Economia Agrícola)
  - The Farm of Calhariz (A Granja do Calhariz)
  - A Legal Project (Projecto de Decreto)
  - Peace and the National Interest (O País e a Nação)
  - Representation of Belém City Hall to the National Government (Representação da Câmara Municipal de Belém ao Governo)
  - Representation of Belém City Hall to Parliament (Representação da Câmara Municipal de Belém ao Parlamento)
  - Agricultural Subsidy Project (Projecto de Caixa de Socorros Agrícolas)
  - On the Question of Forais (Sobre a Questão dos Forais)
- Pamphlets on Literature:
  - What is the condition of our literature? What path will it take? (Qual é o Estado da Nossa Literatura? Qual é o Trilho que Ela Hoje Tem a Seguir?)
  - Poetry: Imitation, Beauty, Unity (Poesia: Imitação—Belo—Unidade)
  - Origins of Modern Theatre: Portuguese Theatre up to the End of the Sixteenth Century (Origens do Teatro Moderno: Teatro Português até aos Fins do Século XVI)
  - Accounts of Portuguese Chivalry (Novelas de Cavalaria Portuguesas)
  - History of Modern Theatre: Spanish Theatre (Historia do Teatro Moderno: Teatro Espanhol)
  - Popular Portuguese Beliefs or Popular Superstitions (Crenças Populares Portuguesas ou Superstições Populares)
  - The House of Gonzalo, a Comedy in Five Acts: An Opinion (A Casa de Gonçalo, Comédia em Cinco Actos: Parecer)
  - Historic Praise for Sebastian Xavier Botelho (Elogio Histórico de Sebastião Xavier Botelho)
  - Lady Maria Teles, a Drama in Five Acts: An Opinion (D. Maria Teles, Drama em Cinco Actos: Parecer)
  - Lady Leonor de Almeida, Marquess of Alorna (D. Leonor de Almeida, Marquesa de Alorna)

=== Other works ===
- From the Isle of Jersey to Granville (De Jersey a Granville) 1831
- Estudos sobre o casamento civil: por occasião do opusculo do sr. Visconde de Seabra sobre este assumpto 1866 (Digitalized at Google)
