= Círio De Nazaré =

Catholic religious event in Pará, Brazil

Círio de Nazaré
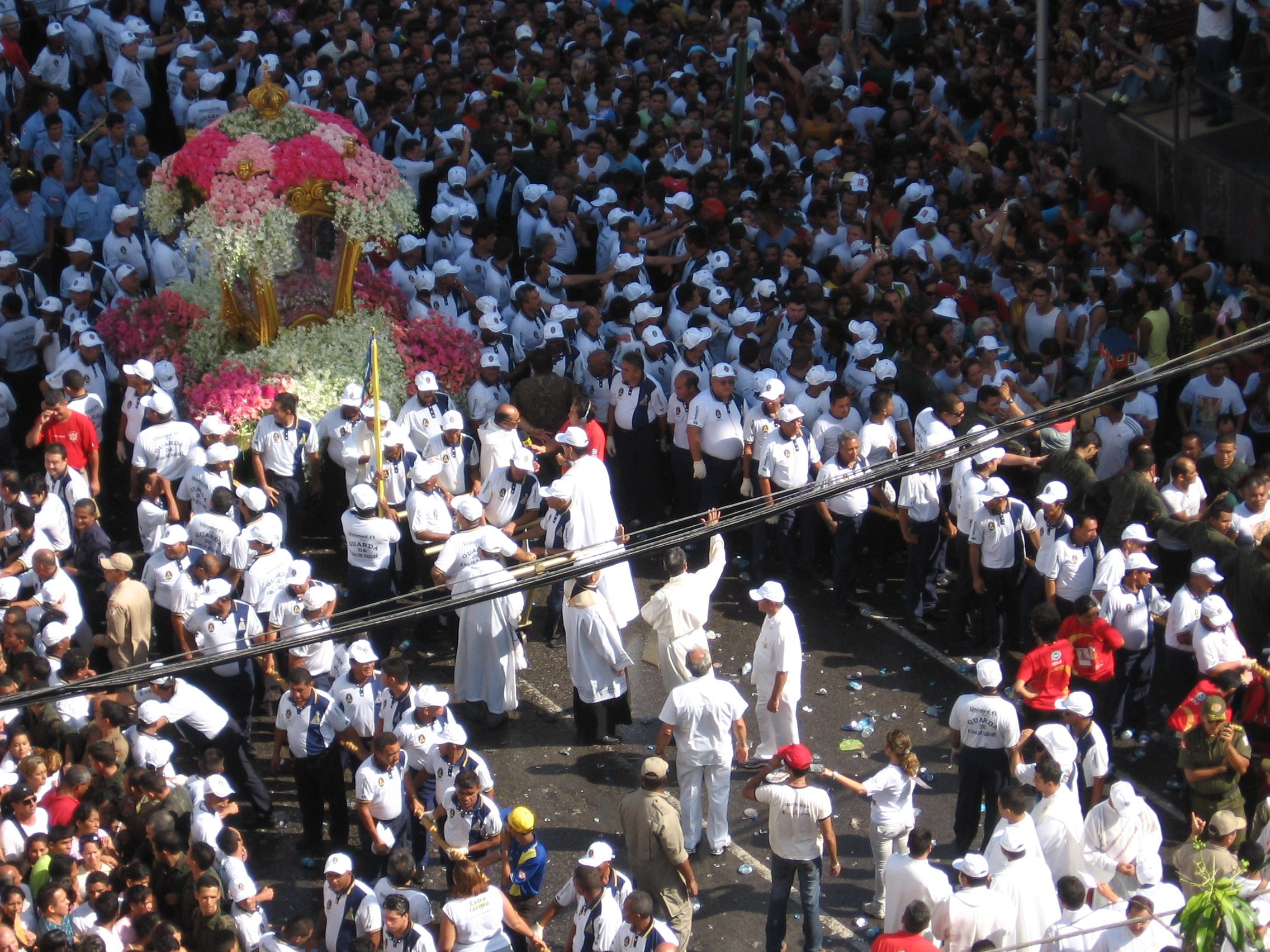
- The Berlin of Nazaré during the 2009 Círio procession
- Official name: Círio de Nossa Senhora de Nazaré
- Observed by: Catholics
- Type: Historical/Cultural
- Date: Second Sunday of October
- Frequency: Annual

Círio de Nazaré (The Taper of Our Lady of Nazareth) in the city of Belém, Pará
- UNESCO Intangible Cultural Heritage
- Country: Brazil
- Reference: 00602
- Region: Latin America and the Caribbean

Inscription history
- Inscription: 2013 (8th session)
- List: Representative

The Círio de Nazaré is a Catholic religious celebration, originating from Portuguese colonizers, involving processions (pilgrimages) in devotion to Our Lady of Nazareth, held in the Brazilian city of Belém (state of Pará). It has been observed annually since 1793, on the second Sunday of October, and currently attracts approximately two million participants.

The devotion traces its roots to Portugal, where it is observed on September 8 in the town of Nazaré. In Brazil, it was originally an evening or nighttime pilgrimage, which explains the use of candles. In 1854, to avoid the heavy rainfall that had occurred the previous year, the procession was moved to the morning.

The Círio began in 1793 in Belém, and until 1882, it started from the Government Palace. In 1882, Bishop Antônio de Macedo Costa, in agreement with the Province President, Justino Ferreira Carneiro, decided the procession would begin at the Our Lady of Grace Cathedral in Belém.

The Círio is the largest Catholic event in Brazil and one of the largest peaceful gatherings of its kind globally. In 2004, it was designated as intangible cultural heritage by the National Institute of Historic and Artistic Heritage (IPHAN) and, in 2013, recognized as a World Heritage Site by UNESCO.

The event also takes place in other parts of the Northern Region, including Macapá, Rio Branco, and Manaus, as well as in various other Brazilian regions due to migration from Pará, where processions are held to maintain a connection to Belém through acts of faith.

== Etymology ==
The term "Círio" derives from the Latin word "cereum", meaning "large candle".

== Legends and stories ==
=== In Portugal ===
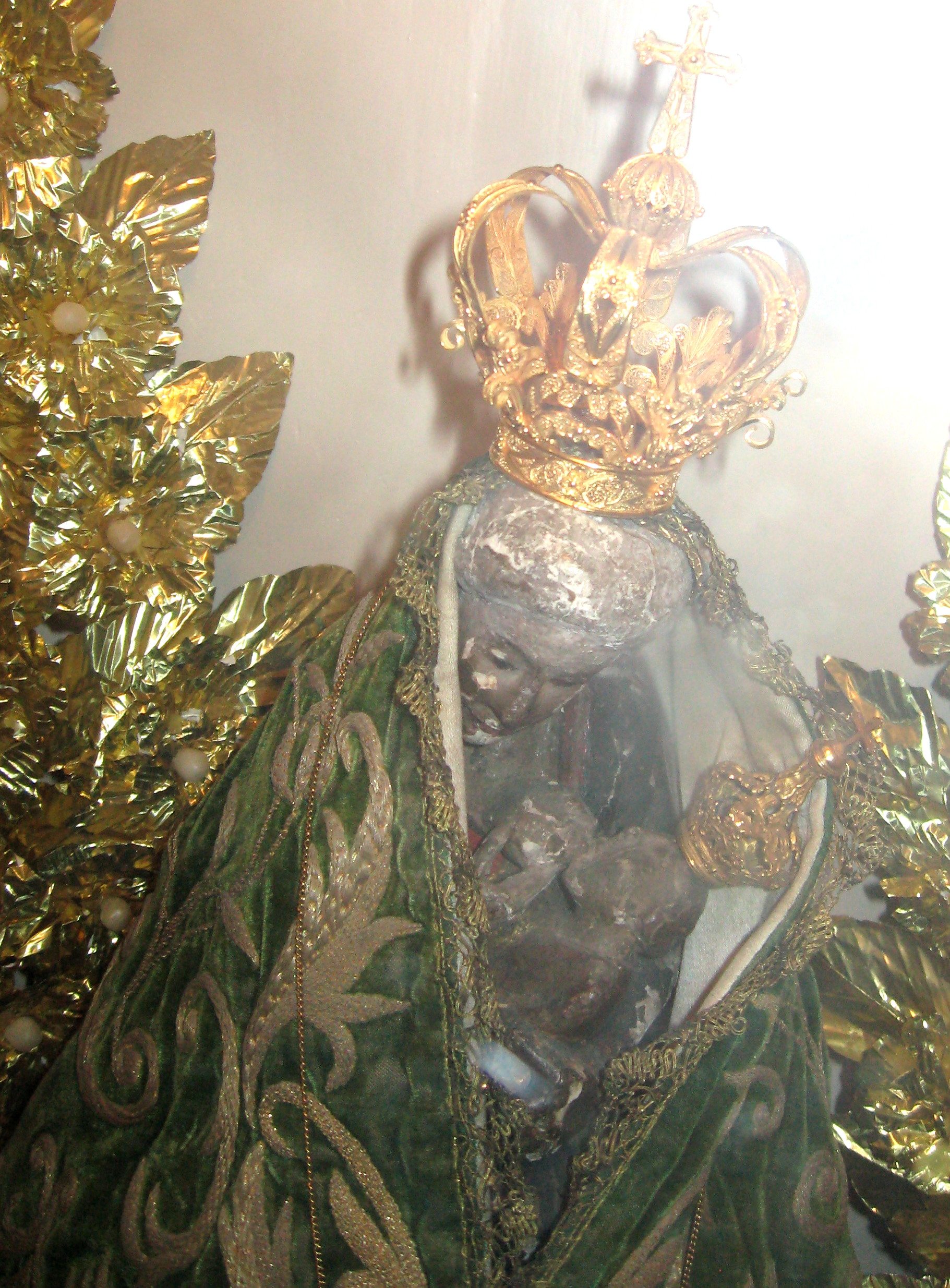
The Sacred Image of Our Lady of Nazareth, Portugal

According to the Legend of Nazaré, a small wooden statue of the Virgin Mary, in which she is depicted seated and nursing the Child Jesus, originated in Nazareth. The dark-colored statue has been identified as an artifact from the early centuries of Christianity. It traveled from Nazareth through Mérida, Spain, and reached Nazaré, Portugal, in 711.

In the 12th century, the statue became a symbol of faith for the knight D. Fuas Roupinho, who, in 1182, built the Chapel of Our Lady of Nazaré in gratitude to the Virgin after surviving a serious accident while pursuing a deer on horseback. The chapel was constructed over a cave where the statue was located. In 1377, King Ferdinand (1367–1383) established a larger temple, the Sanctuary of Our Lady of Nazaré, to which the statue was moved. Since then, every September, the Portuguese gather at the Sítio da Nazaré to honor Our Lady of Nazareth. The main pilgrimage, the Círio da Prata Grande, starts in Mafra and carries another image of the Virgin Mary standing, similar to the one venerated in the Brazilian Círio, in a Berlin.

=== In Brazil ===
In the 17th century, devotion to Our Lady of Nazareth was introduced in Pará by the priests of the Society of Jesus (Jesuits). Although the devotion began in Vigia de Nazaré, the most well-known account states that in 1700, Plácido, a caboclo descendant of Portuguese and indigenous ancestry, found a small, deteriorated wooden statue of Our Lady of Nazareth, a replica of the Portuguese statue, approximately 28 cm tall, near the Murutucu stream in Belém, an area now behind the Basilica of Our Lady of Nazareth of Exile.

Plácido took the statue to his home, cleaned it, and created a makeshift altar. According to tradition, the statue repeatedly returned to its original location, prompting Plácido to interpret this as a divine sign and build a small hermitage at the site. The story of the statue’s return attracted local residents, who began visiting the hermitage to pay homage. The account gained the attention of the governor of the Captaincy of Grão Pará, Francisco Maurício de Sousa Coutinho, who ordered the statue moved to the city palace’s chapel. Despite being kept under guard, the statue disappeared and reappeared at Plácido’s hermitage. This led to the devotion gaining official status, and the Basilica of Our Lady of Nazareth was later built where the hermitage stood.

In 1773, the archbishop and bishop of Belém do Pará, João Evangelista Pereira da Silva, placed Belém under the protection of Our Lady of Nazareth. In 1774, the statue was sent to Portugal for restoration and returned in October of that year in a procession from the city port to the sanctuary, accompanied by the governor, bishop, and other authorities, marking the first Círio. The event has since been held annually on the second Sunday of October.

One notable miracle attributed to the Belém statue involves the passengers of the Portuguese brig "São João Batista". On July 11, 1846, the brig, which had previously carried the statue to Lisbon for restoration in 1774, wrecked shortly after departing Belém for Lisbon. The passengers were saved by a dinghy, which had also transported the statue in 1774, and returned to Belém. The dinghy has accompanied the procession since 1885.

Although the Belém Círio is the most prominent in Brazil, the oldest Círio, dating to 1630, is in Saquarema, Rio de Janeiro. After a stormy night, fishermen found a miraculous image of the Virgin Mary among rocks separating the sea from a lagoon, where the current Parish Church stands. The image reportedly returned to the rocks multiple times, leading religious authorities to begin constructing a chapel, later replaced by the current temple. The Saquarema Círio was recognized as Brazil’s oldest during a visit by the Belém pilgrim image on September 23, 2009.

== Interesting facts ==
- The Círio rope was introduced in 1855 to pull the Berlin carrying the image of Our Lady of Nazareth due to flooding from the Guajará Bay in the Ver-o-peso area. It was officially adopted in 1868.
- The rope initially had a U-shape, with two rows for men and women, both attached to the Berlin, used from 1922 to 2004. Since 2005, it has a linear format with five stations, resembling a Catholic rosary, with a head nucleus and a Berlin nucleus. The rope measures 400 meters long and two inches in diameter.
- According to tradition, Plácido found the statue wearing a mantle. Since then, a new mantle is crafted for each Círio based on the festivity’s theme. Until 1973, Sister Alessandra of the Daughters of Saint Anne Congregation, linked to Gentil Bittencourt School, created the mantles using donated materials from anonymous devotees. After her death, her student, Ester Paes Rocha, took over, and various designers have since contributed to the mantle’s artwork.
- Initially held between September and November without a fixed date, the Círio was set for the second Sunday of October in 1901 by Bishop Dom Francisco de Rego Maia.
- The Berlin was introduced in 1882 at Bishop Dom Macedo Costa’s suggestion. Until 1854, the statue was carried by a Government Palace chaplain on a litter by four or six men. In 1855, a carriage, a precursor to the Berlin, was used.
- Initially, the statue was carried alone in the Berlin. Until the rope was introduced, the carriage was pulled by horses. In 1926, the Berlin was replaced by an andor under Archbishop Dom João Irineu Joffily’s changes, but it returned in 1930. The rope was removed in 1926 due to violence concerns but reinstated in 1931 with the Berlin.
- There are five official Berlin versions, with the current one in use since 1964, restored in 2012. Replicas are used in other pilgrimages, and a niche holds the statue in the presbytery for the Children’s Pilgrimage and Festival Procession.
- The pilgrimage originally started at the Government Palace, moved to the Our Lady of Grace Cathedral in 1882, and began at the Church of Saint Alexander in 1891.
- In 1918, the Círio was held on the last Sunday of October due to the Spanish Flu pandemic, marking the first date change since 1901.
- In 1969, a replica of the statue, known as the Pilgrim Image, was crafted in a caboclo style, representing the Amazonian population. It is used in the Círio pilgrimages and was restored in 2002. The original statue, the Original Image, is kept in the Basilica Sanctuary’s Glória do Altar-Môr, lowered in May for the basilica’s sanctuary status festivities and in October during the Nazarene period, placed in a glass dome. The statue left the basilica three times: in 1980 for Pope John Paul II’s visit, in 1992 for the 200th Círio anniversary, and in 2021 for a blessing outside the basilica.
- The Image Lowering Ceremony, started in 1969, was initially restricted and held after the Transfer at 11 p.m. Since 1992, it has been open to the public at noon after the Motorromaria. In 2020, it was restricted due to COVID-19 measures, and in 2021, it was open with limited capacity for vaccinated individuals, returning to standard format in 2022.
- In 1991, the Círio reached one million participants, and in 1992, it reached two million.
- The 2000 and 2004 editions were the longest, with the 2000 procession ending at 3:45 p.m. due to a Berlin wheel issue and disorganization, and the 2004 procession ending at 4:15 p.m. due to a rope attachment issue.
- In 2002, a fire at Casa Chamma caused the Berlin to detour via Avenida João Alfredo and Travessa Frutuoso Guimarães, ending at 11:15 a.m., the third fastest Círio, surpassed by the 2019 (11:30 a.m.) and 1995 (10:37 a.m.) editions, the latter facilitated by the rope not being attached.
- In 2004, the procession began during the Holy Mass at the offertory to end earlier, but the rope issue caused the longest procession.
- In 2020, the Círio was canceled due to the COVID-19 pandemic, replaced by a special program including a Holy Mass, hospital visits, documentaries, shows, and a flyover of the pilgrim image. Processions elsewhere were also canceled. This followed a cancellation in 1835 due to the Cabanagem revolt.
- In 2021, the transfer to Ananindeua and Marituba resumed along main roads, but the main procession was not held.

== Timeline ==
- 1630 - Devotion to Our Lady of Nazareth begins in Saquarema, marking the first Círio in Brazil.
- 1653 - Devotion to Our Lady of Nazareth begins in Vigia.
- 1697 - First record of the Círio in Vigia. (Note: This record follows a narrative from the Crônica da Missão dos Padres da Companhia de Jesus no Estado do Maranhão by João Felipe Bettendorff (1625–1698), with a fragment of the procession in the city dated to 1750. However, according to IPHAN documentation, the Círio in Vigia began in the mid-19th century.)
- 1700 - Plácido, a caboclo, finds a deteriorated statue of Our Lady of Nazareth near the Murutucu stream, now behind the Basilica of Our Lady of Nazareth of Exile.
- 1720 - The first hermitage is built to house the statue.
- 1730 - Construction of the second hermitage, inaugurated in 1744.
- 1773 - The archbishop and bishop of Belém, João Evangelista Pereira da Silva, places Belém under the protection of Our Lady of Nazaré.
- 1774 - The statue is sent to Portugal for restoration and returns in a procession to Belém.
- 1790 - Authorization is granted for the festivities of Our Lady of Nazareth.
- 1793 - The first Círio is held in Belém.
- 1799 - Construction of the third hermitage, inaugurated between 1800 and 1802.
- 1805 - The Float of Miracles is introduced, commemorating the 1182 miracle of Dom Fuas Roupinho, ordered by Queen Maria I of Portugal.
- 1826 - The fireworks float is introduced, discontinued in 1983 to prevent accidents.
- 1835 - The Círio is not held due to the Cabanagem revolt.
- 1840 - The statue undergoes a second restoration in Portugal.
- 1846 - The miracle of the brig João Batista occurs, with sailors surviving a shipwreck.
- 1854 - The Círio is moved to the morning due to heavy rains.
- 1855 - The litter is replaced by a carriage, a precursor to the Berlin, and the rope is used due to flooding. A cholera epidemic affects Belém but does not stop the Círio.
- 1859 - The first Recírio is held, with the statue returning to the Government Palace.
- 1868 - The rope is officially adopted.
- 1878 - The first Civil Círio was conducted without the participation of clergy, which was regarded as sacrilege.
- 1880 - Dom Macedo Costa decrees the statue be carried alone in the Berlin.
- 1881 - The only recorded Festival Procession is held.
- 1882 - The Círio starts from the Our Lady of Grace Cathedral. The Berlin is crafted in its current format.
- 1885 - The population replaces horses to pull the Berlin.
- 1891 - The Círio starts from the Church and College of Saint Alexander.
- 1901 - The second Sunday of October is set as the official date.
- 1905 - The Barnabite Fathers manage the Parish of Our Lady of Nazareth.
- 1906 - Construction begins on the Basilica of Nazareth. The Transfer starts from Gentil Bittencourt School.
- 1909 - The song Vós Sois o Lírio Mimoso is composed as the Círio’s official hymn.
- 1914 - The first Círio is held in Manaus.
- 1916 - The Float of Promises is introduced.
- 1918 - The Círio is held on the last Sunday of October due to the Spanish Flu.
- 1920 - The Basilica of Nazareth is inaugurated, still incomplete.
- 1923 - The Church of Nazaré is elevated to basilica status.
- 1926 - The rope is removed due to violence concerns, and the Berlin is replaced by an andor.
- 1931 - The rope and Berlin return. The first Círio is held in Rio Branco.
- 1934 - The first Círio is held in Macapá.
- 1946 - The first Círio is held in Acará.
- 1949 - The first tribute by dockworkers occurs at Praça Pedro Teixeira, discontinued in 2017.
- 1951 - The pilgrimage route is altered to pass municipal and state palaces.
- 1954 - The Festival Procession is held in the morning due to heavy rains.
- 1958 - The first Círio is held in Tracuateua.
- 1964 - The current Berlin model is introduced.
- 1968 - A new image is commissioned, resembling Amazonian women and an indigenous Child Jesus.
- 1969 - The Pilgrim Image is used in pilgrimages, and the first lowering ceremony is held.
- 1972 - Home pilgrimages of the Nazaré image begin.
- 1974 - The Nazaré Guard of Belém is established. The first Círio is held in Brasília.
- 1977 - Images of Our Lady of Nazareth and Saint Louis Gonzaga are stolen from Madre de Deus Church in Vigia, later recovered.
- 1978 - The first Festa da Chiquita is held.
- 1980 - The first floats’ transport procession and the first Círio in Marabá are held.
- 1982 - The Nazaré Architectural Center (CAN) is inaugurated, and the first Círio is held in Paragominas.
- 1986 - The first Fluvial Pilgrimage is held.
- 1988 - The Transfer follows the Círio’s route in reverse.
- 1989 - The first Road Pilgrimage is held toward Icoaraci.
- 1990 - The first Motorromaria and Children’s Pilgrimage are held.
- 1991 - The Círio reaches one million participants.
- 1992 - The 200th Círio introduces the Transfer to Ananindeua, and the original statue participates. The procession reaches two million participants. The first Círio is held in São Luís.
- 1993 - The Círio celebrates 200 years.
- 1995 - The rope attachment begins at Avenida Boulevard Castillo França, and Rádio Nazaré FM provides sound.
- 1997 - The Transfer Mass is moved to 5 p.m.
- 1998 - The first Castanhal Pilgrimage is held.
- 1999 - Following the Fluvial Pilgrimage, the statue is presented with military police honors.
- 2000 - The Float of Plácido and the Nazaré Junior Guard are introduced.
- 2001 - The first Youth Pilgrimage is held.
- 2002 - A fire at Casa Chamma causes a detour, ending the procession early. The Transfer includes Marituba.
- 2004 - The Círio arrives at Praça Santuário around 4:15 p.m., the longest edition in history, surpassing the 2000 record. It was the only time the procession left Largo da Sé before the end of the Holy Mass, during the offertory, to speed up the pilgrimage, causing controversy. The Círio is designated Intangible Cultural Heritage by IPHAN. The first Cycle Pilgrimage is held.
- 2005 - The rope adopts a new format.
- 2006 - The Basilica is elevated to sanctuary status.
- 2009 - The Transfer Mass is moved to 4:30 p.m.
- 2014 - The first Runners’ Pilgrimage is held.
- 2018 - The Transfer surpasses the Círio in attendance.
- 2020 - The Círio is canceled due to the COVID-19 pandemic, replaced by the Aerial Círio.
- 2021 - The Transfer resumes, but the main procession is replaced by the Aerial Círio.
- 2022 - The first Float Transport is held as an official pilgrimage.
- 2023 - The first Accessibility Pilgrimage is held. The Transfer and Círio encounter challenges with the ropes, but they nevertheless proceed. The first Círio outside Brazil is held in Miami.

== Official pilgrimages ==
The religious devotion spans fifteen days during the Nazarene Fortnight. Key pilgrimages include:

| Pilgrimage | Description | First Edition | Ref. |
|---|---|---|---|
| Transport of the Floats | The transport of 14 floats occurs four days before the main pilgrimage, heading to the Pará Dock Company warehouses via Nazaré Avenue, 14 de Março Street, Antônio Barreto Street, Visconde de Souza Franco Avenue, and Marechal Hermes Avenue. It became an official pilgrimage in 2019, debuting in 2022 due to the COVID-19 rescheduling. | 1980 | |
| Road Transfer - Ananindeua and Marituba | On the Friday before the Círio, the statue processes in a Federal Police vehicle through Belém, Ananindeua, and Marituba, accompanied by various vehicles and people. It stops for tributes and concludes at Matriz Square in Ananindeua. Since 2002, it includes Marituba and starts in the morning. | 1992 | |
| Road Pilgrimage | The statue travels from the Basilica Sanctuary to Icoaraci, accompanied by vehicles and people. Since 1990, it starts from the Belém Cargo Terminal, and since 1992, from Matriz Square in Ananindeua, early Saturday. | 1989 | |
| Fluvial Pilgrimage or Círio Fluvial | The statue travels along Guajará Bay on the Garnier Sampaio (H-37) ship from Icoaraci, accompanied by vessels honoring the Virgin. In 1986, clouds reportedly formed a face during the first edition. | 1986 | |
| Motorcycle Pilgrimage | After the Fluvial Pilgrimage, motorcyclists accompany the statue to Escadinha do Cais do Porto, concluding at Gentil Bittencourt School. From 1987 to 1989, it was transported by bus. | 1990 | |
| Transfer | Held at night before the Círio, the statue moves from Gentil Bittencourt School to the Belém Metropolitan Cathedral since 1906. It follows the Círio route in reverse since 1988. In 2018, it surpassed the Círio in attendance. | 1793 | |
| Círio | The main procession, held on the second Sunday of October, starts at the Belém Cathedral and ends at Sanctuary Square, attracting around 2 million people. | 1793 | |
| Bicycle Pilgrimage | Cyclists honor the Virgin on the Saturday following the Círio. | 2004 | |
| Youth Pilgrimage | Youth communities honor the Virgin on the Saturday afternoon after the Círio, hosted by different parishes, featuring a missionary cross since 2012. | 2001 | |
| Children's Pilgrimage | On the third Sunday of October, children process with the statue in the Berlin along a shorter route, led by floats of angels and promises. | 1990 | |
| Runners' Pilgrimage | Runners honor the Virgin on the last Saturday of the festivity along an 8-9 km route. | 2014 | |
| Accessibility Pilgrimage | Associations for people with disabilities honor the Virgin on a short route after the Runners’ Pilgrimage. | 2023 | |
| Festival Procession | A parish community starts this procession, including pastoral groups, on the last Sunday of the festivity. (Note: It is not certain when this procession was first held, although historical records document an edition in 1881) | 1881 | |
| Recírio | The shortest procession, on Monday morning, concludes at Gentil Bittencourt School. It includes a prayer of supplication and the incineration of objects associated with promises. | 1859 | |
| Aerial Círio | Held in 2020 and 2021 due to the COVID-19 pandemic, the statue flew over Belém, Ananindeua, Marituba, and Icoaraci, discontinued in 2022. | 2020 | |

== Symbols ==
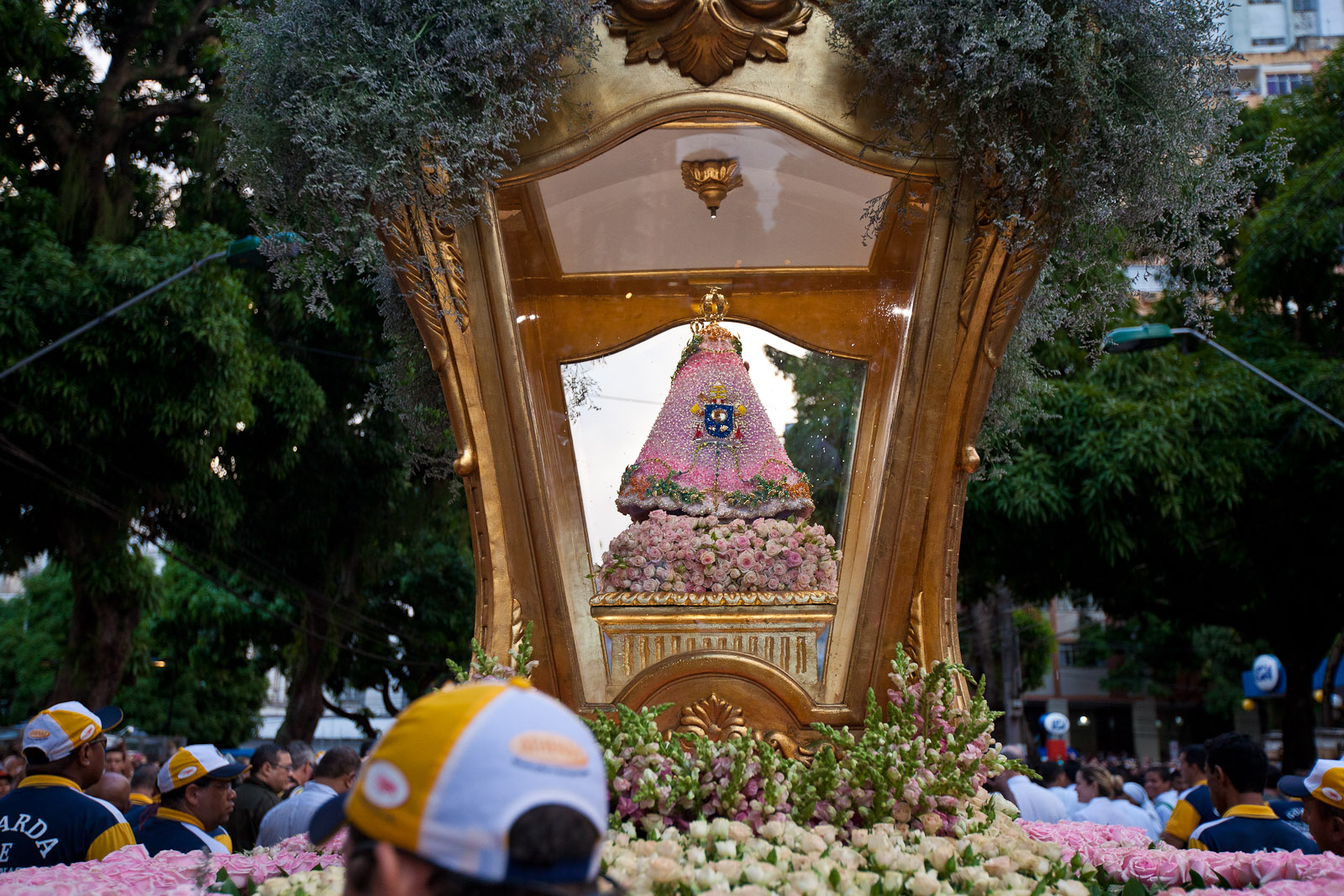
Berlin of Nazaré

The Berlin, crafted in 1964 by João Pinto in Baroque style from red cedar, carries the statue during the Círio and Transfer, adorned with natural flowers. Smaller Berlins are used in other pilgrimages.

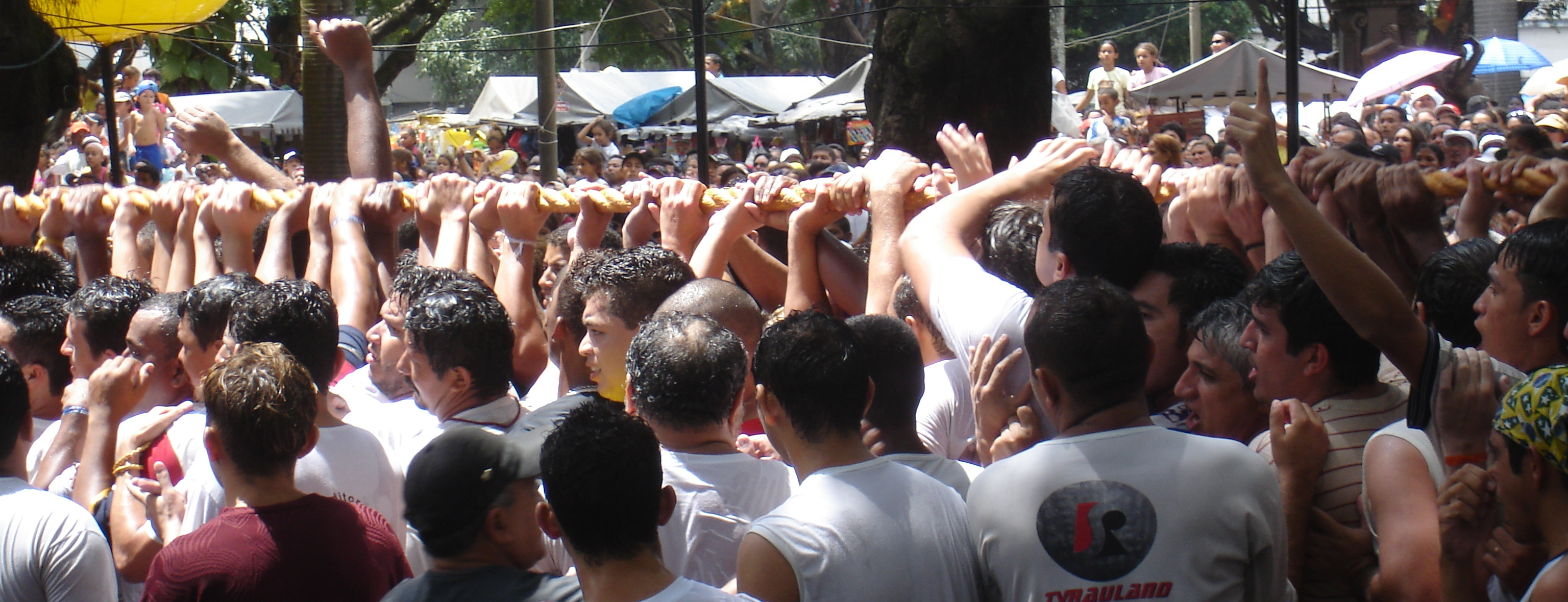
The rope symbolizes the fulfillment of the pilgrims' vows.

The 400-meter, 700-kilogram rope, made of twisted sisal, was introduced in 1868 to replace the use of oxen. Since 2005, it is shaped like a rosary to prevent delays.

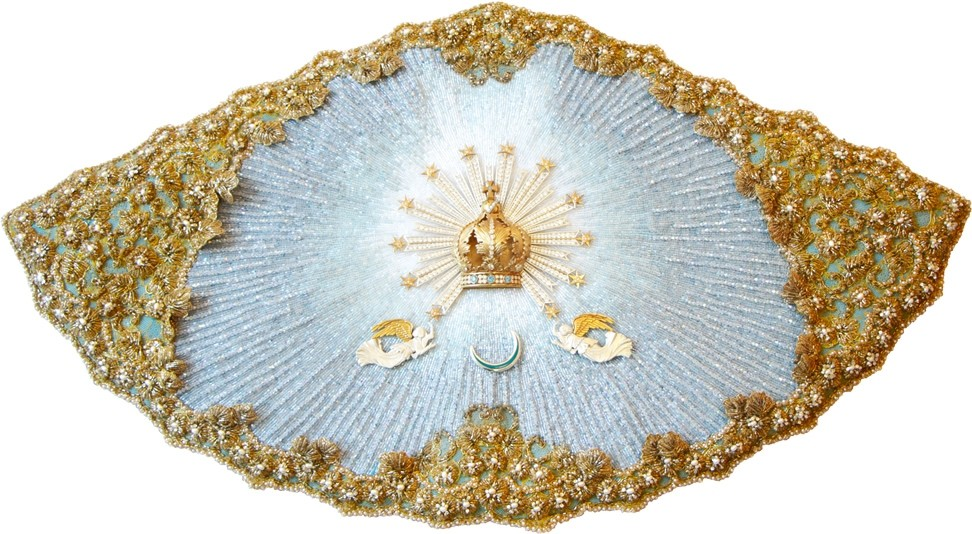
Mantle used by the image of Nazaré during the 2020 Círio

The mantle, which is newly crafted each year, covers the statue, depicting Gospel themes. It was initially made by the Daughters of Mary, then Sister Alexandra, and later Ester Paes França.

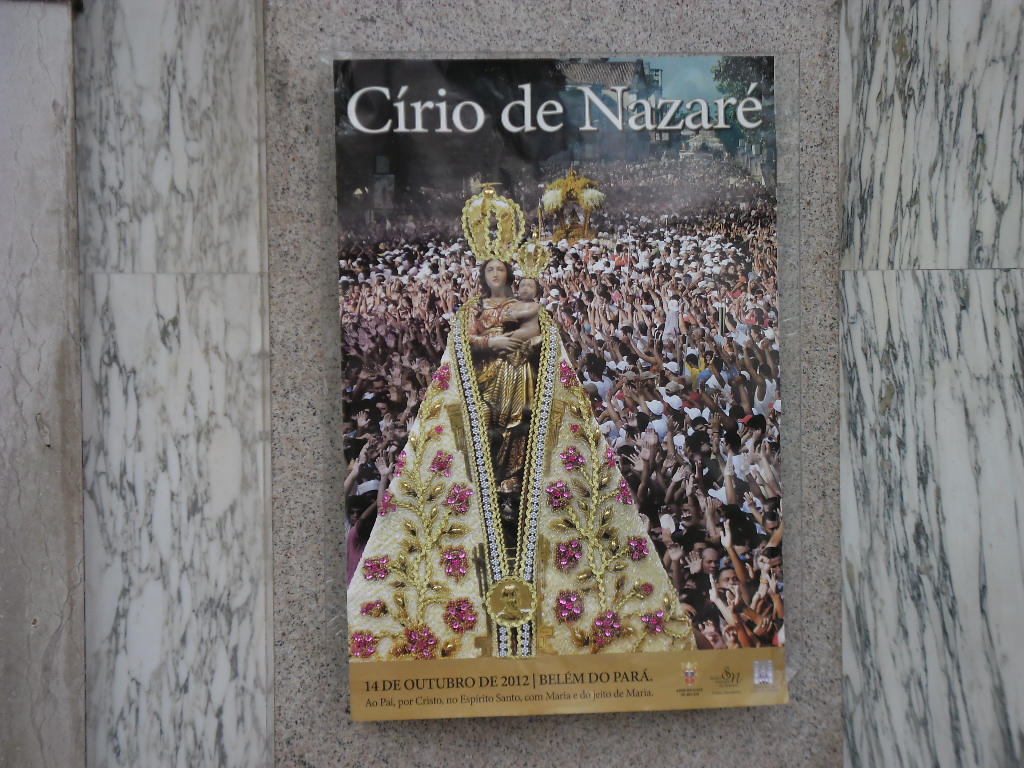
Official poster of the 2012 Círio

Círio posters, displayed since 1826, promote the festival. Initially handcrafted, they are now designed from photographs.

Candles and floats of promises symbolize vows, with children dressed as angels participating.

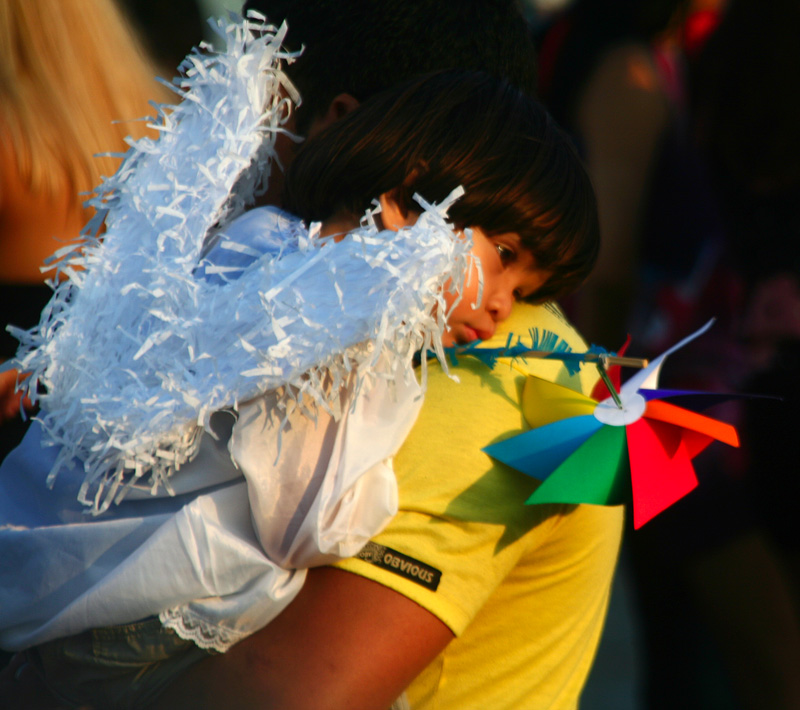
Children dressed as angels, one of the traditional symbols of the Círio found during the processions

The fireworks displays during the passage of the image through the historic center of Belém occur during the Transfer night and the main Círio day, organized by the Union of Stevedores of the State of Pará. Additional tributes during these processions are provided by the Bank of Brazil, the Bank of the State of Pará, and the Bank of the Amazon. These institutions often feature performances by invited singers to honor the patroness of Pará. The Bank of Brazil contributes a display of confetti, balloons, and streamers launched from the top floor of its headquarters, covering Presidente Vargas Avenue. Other tributes are offered by the choir of the Theatro da Paz, residents of the Manoel Pinto da Silva Building, state and municipal secretariats, the football teams Paysandu Sport Club and Clube do Remo, the Rede Liberal, and the Marist and Santa Catarina de Sena schools, all located along the procession route.

Other traditions include novenas, prayer cycles held in the weeks leading up to the festivity by devotees who visit neighbors' homes. The family lunch, held on the Sunday of the procession, is a communal event often compared to Christmas in significance for the people of Pará. The traditional Círio lunch includes duck in tucupi, a dish of Pará cuisine, served with white rice and maniçoba, another regional dish. The Nazaré Fair is held adjacent to the Basilica Sanctuary, where the so-called miriti toys are sold.

== Dates and attendance ==
The Círio procession occurs annually on the second Sunday of October, resulting in a variable date. The following table lists the ordinal numbering of the Círio de Nazaré, their dates, approximate attendance, duration, and themes adopted since 1995.

Círio de Nazaré Editions
| Edition | Date | Number of People | Approximate Duration | Theme | Ref. |
|---|---|---|---|---|---|
| 233rd | October 12, 2025 | Announced after the completion of the pilgrimage | | "Mary, mother and queen of all creation" | |
| 232nd | October 13, 2024 | 2.3 million people | 5 hours and 2 minutes | "Persevere in prayer with Mary, mother of Jesus" | |
| 231st | October 8, 2023 | 2.3 million people | 4 hours and 53 minutes | "Mary, sign of hope for the people of God on their journey" | |
| 230th | October 9, 2022 | 2.5 million people | 5 hours and 10 minutes | "Mary, mother and teacher" | |
| 229th | October 10, 2021 | No procession was held due to the COVID-19 pandemic. | | "The gospel of the family in the house of Mary" | |
| 228th | October 11, 2020 | No procession was held due to the COVID-19 pandemic. | | "Hail Mary, full of grace" | |
| 227th | October 13, 2019 | 2 million people | 4 hours and 30 minutes | "Mary, mother of the church" | |
| 226th | October 14, 2018 | 1.1 million people | 4 hours and 57 minutes | "A young woman named Mary" | |
| 225th | October 8, 2017 | 2 million people | 5 hours | "Mary, star of evangelization" | |
| 224th | October 9, 2016 | 2 million people | 5 hours and 17 minutes | "Hail Mary, mother of mercy" | |
| 223rd | October 11, 2015 | 2 million people | 5 hours and 15 minutes | "Mary, Eucharistic woman" | |
| 222nd | October 12, 2014 | 2 million people | 5 hours and 25 minutes | "Teach your people to pray" | |
| 221st | October 13, 2013 | 2.1 million people | 6 hours and 05 minutes | "The Church in prayer united with Mary, mother of Jesus" | |
| 220th | October 14, 2012 | 2 million people | 6 hours | "To the Father, through Christ, in the Holy Spirit, with Mary and in Mary's way" | |
| 219th | October 9, 2011 | 2 million people | 5 hours and 30 minutes | "Do whatever He tells you" | |
| 218th | October 10, 2010 | 2.2 million people | 5 hours and 20 minutes | "Mary, the blessed one because she believed" | |
| 217th | October 11, 2009 | 2 million people | 5 hours and 23 minutes | "In Mary, the word became flesh" | |
| 216th | October 12, 2008 | 2 million people | 7 hours | "In Belém of Mary, we choose life as a mission" | |
| 215th | October 14, 2007 | 2 million people | 7 hours | "With the Queen of the Amazon, we form missionary communities" | |
| 214th | October 8, 2006 | 2 million people | 5 hours and 30 minutes | "With Mary, we learn to be disciples and missionaries of Jesus" | |
| 213th | October 9, 2005 | 2 million people | 5 hours | "With Mary, in Belém, we want to see Jesus" | |
| 212th | October 10, 2004 | 1.7 million people | 9 hours and 15 minutes | "You are daughter, wife, and mother of God, who is one and triune" | |
| 211th | October 12, 2003 | 2 million people | 5 hours | "Show the Virgin of Nazareth, contemplating the mysteries of Jesus' life" | |
| 210th | October 13, 2002 | 1.8 million people | 4 hours and 45 minutes | "Jesus Christ, through Mary, ever more known, loved, and followed" | |
| 209th | October 14, 2001 | 1.5 million people | 7 hours | "Be the Church with Mary, in the new millennium" | |
| 208th | October 8, 2000 | Unknown | 8 hours and 35 minutes | "Belém, with Mary, open your doors to Jesus the Savior" | |
| 207th | October 10, 1999 | 1.5 million people | 6 hours | "Through Mary, deliver us according to the Father's mercy" | |
| 206th | October 11, 1998 | Unknown | Unknown | "The Spirit unites us in one body, with Mary, mother of Jesus" | |
| 205th | October 12, 1997 | 1.5 million people | Unknown | "With Mary, on the road of Jesus, toward the new millennium" | |
| 204th | October 13, 1996 | 1.5 million people | Unknown | With Mary, mother of God, an organized, prosperous, and happy people | |
| 203rd | October 8, 1995 | Unknown | 3 hours and 45 minutes | With Mary, the hope of a world of brothers | |
| 202nd | October 9, 1994 | Unknown | Unknown | No theme | |
| 201st | October 10, 1993 | Unknown | Unknown | No theme | |
| 200th | October 11, 1992 | 2 million people | Unknown | No theme | |
| 199th | October 13, 1991 | 1 million people | Unknown | No theme | |
| 190th | October 10, 1982 | 800,000 people | Unknown | No theme | |
| 188th | October 12, 1980 | 800,000 people | Unknown | No theme | |
| 187th | October 14, 1979 | 700,000 people | Unknown | No theme | |
| 184th | October 10, 1976 | 500,000 people | Unknown | No theme | |
| 185th | October 12, 1975 | 400,000 people | Unknown | No theme | |
| 174th | October 9, 1966 | 400,000 people | Unknown | No theme | |
| 145th | October 10, 1937 | 200,000 people | Unknown | No theme | |
| 110th | October 12, 1902 | 25,000 people | Unknown | No theme | |
| 42nd | November 1835 | No procession was held due to the Cabanagem | | No theme | |
| 1st | September 8, 1793 | No information available on attendance, duration, or theme. It was the first Círio held. | | | |

== Círio de Nazaré in other cities ==
Similar processions to the one in Belém are held in several other cities in Pará and Brazil, including the Círio of Soure, Vigia, Santarém, Abaetetuba, Castanhal, Bragança, Breves, and Marabá. The city of Rio de Janeiro holds a procession in September in Copacabana. Processions also take place in Brasília, Rio Branco, Manaus, Macapá, and Recife, introduced by residents from Pará. In São Luís, the Círio follows the same format as Belém but occurs in the afternoon and is the second-largest procession in Maranhão, after the procession of São José de Ribamar.

== Broadcasting ==
The first live broadcasts of the Círio occurred during the radio era through Rádio Clube do Pará and Super Rádio Marajoara. Due to technical limitations in the 1950s, announcers followed the pilgrimage in cars and used fixed points for interviews, employing electrical wires, microphones, and telephone lines. The introduction of recorders in the 1960s facilitated external coverage. Sound trucks were first utilized in 1988, followed by loudspeakers affixed to lighting poles. Subsequently, these were strategically positioned along the designated route. In 1995, Rádio Nazaré FM began covering the Círio with prayers, hymns, and updates on the Berlin's location and tributes.

The first televised images of the Círio appeared in the 1950s via black-and-white films. In the 1960s, TV Marajoara and TV Guajará (now Boas Novas Belém) began broadcasting select moments of the pilgrimage. TV Marajoara used strategic locations, such as the Stevedores' Square, the Cathedral front, and Nazaré Square, with audio from Rádio Marajoara. In the 1970s, TV Marajoara adopted color images using Rede Tupi's microwave system and increased live coverage points in partnership with TV Guajará, forming the Paraense Television Network.

In 1976, TV Liberal Belém introduced real-time coverage, focusing on the passage in front of its headquarters on Nazaré Avenue and the Stevedores' tributes at the former O Liberal building. In 1983, TV Liberal broadcast the first aerial images using a helicopter. In 1997, the Círio was broadcast online globally using TV Liberal’s signal.

In 1988, RBA TV joined other stations in the Paraense Television Network, which was discontinued in the 2000s. In 1989, the Fluvial Pilgrimage was broadcast live by a Rede Manchete affiliate.

In 2002, TV Nazaré began broadcasting the Nazarene Fortnight programming live, becoming the official broadcaster of the Círio. In 2018, TV Nazaré broadcast the Transfer live for the first time. National broadcasts began in 1992 through the Network of Educational Stations, followed by TV Cultura, Rede Bandeirantes in 2008, and Amazon Sat in 2013. In 2024, Rede Bandeirantes and TV Brasil resumed national broadcasts in collaboration with TV Cultura do Pará.

In 2014, SBT Pará broadcast the Círio in high definition. In 2020 and 2021, due to the COVID-19 pandemic, stations aired special programs instead of the pilgrimage, with TV Nazaré and Rede Cultura do Pará providing images of the Aerial Círio. TV Círio, a free streaming service, was launched to cover pilgrimages, masses, and special programs. All pilgrimages of the Nazarene Fortnight are currently broadcast by Rede Cultura do Pará, SBT Pará (except in 2016 and 2017), TV Liberal, RecordTV Belém, RBA TV, TV Nazaré, and TV Círio.

== Image gallery ==
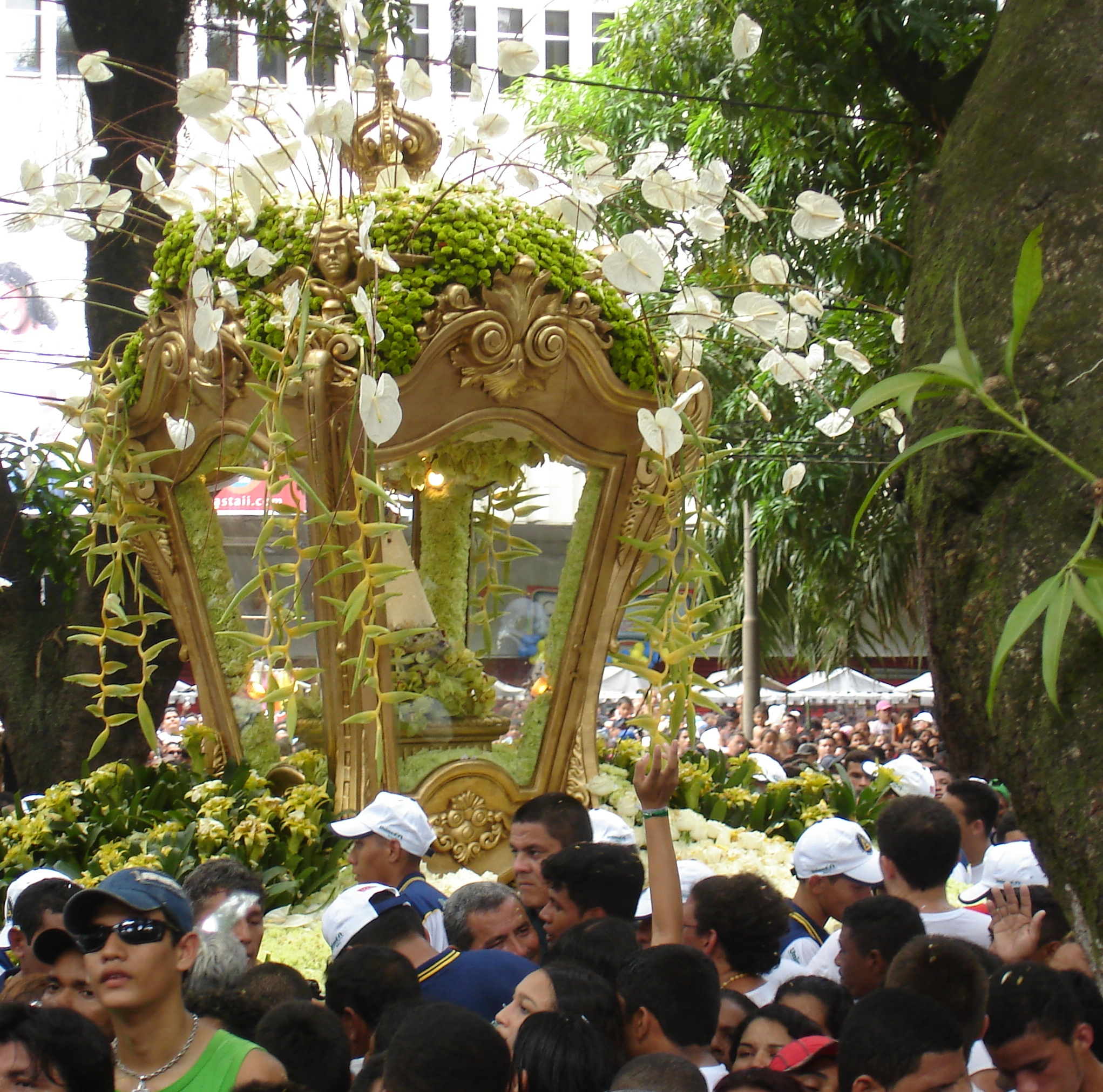
Berlin

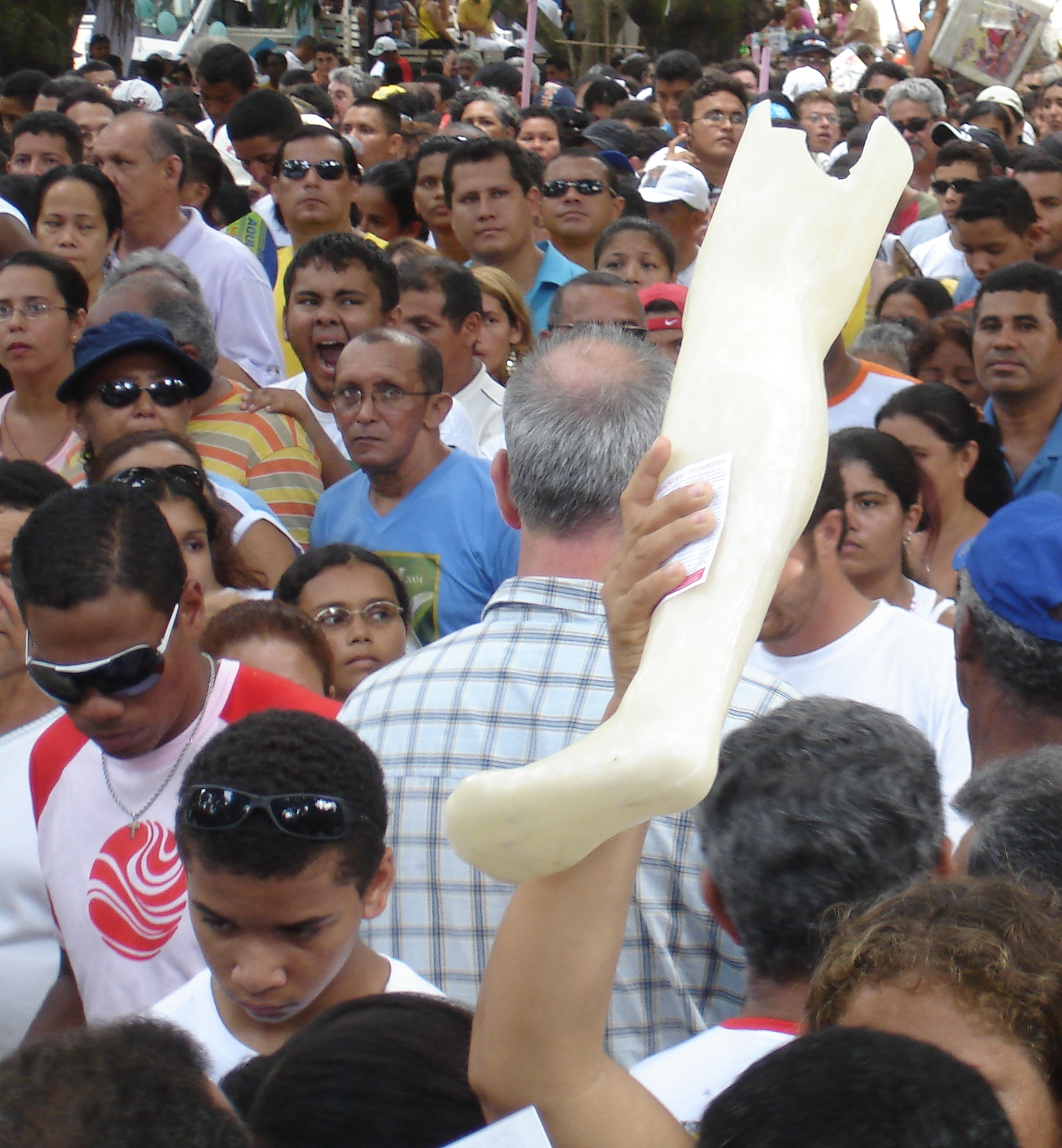
Ex-voto (wax leg)

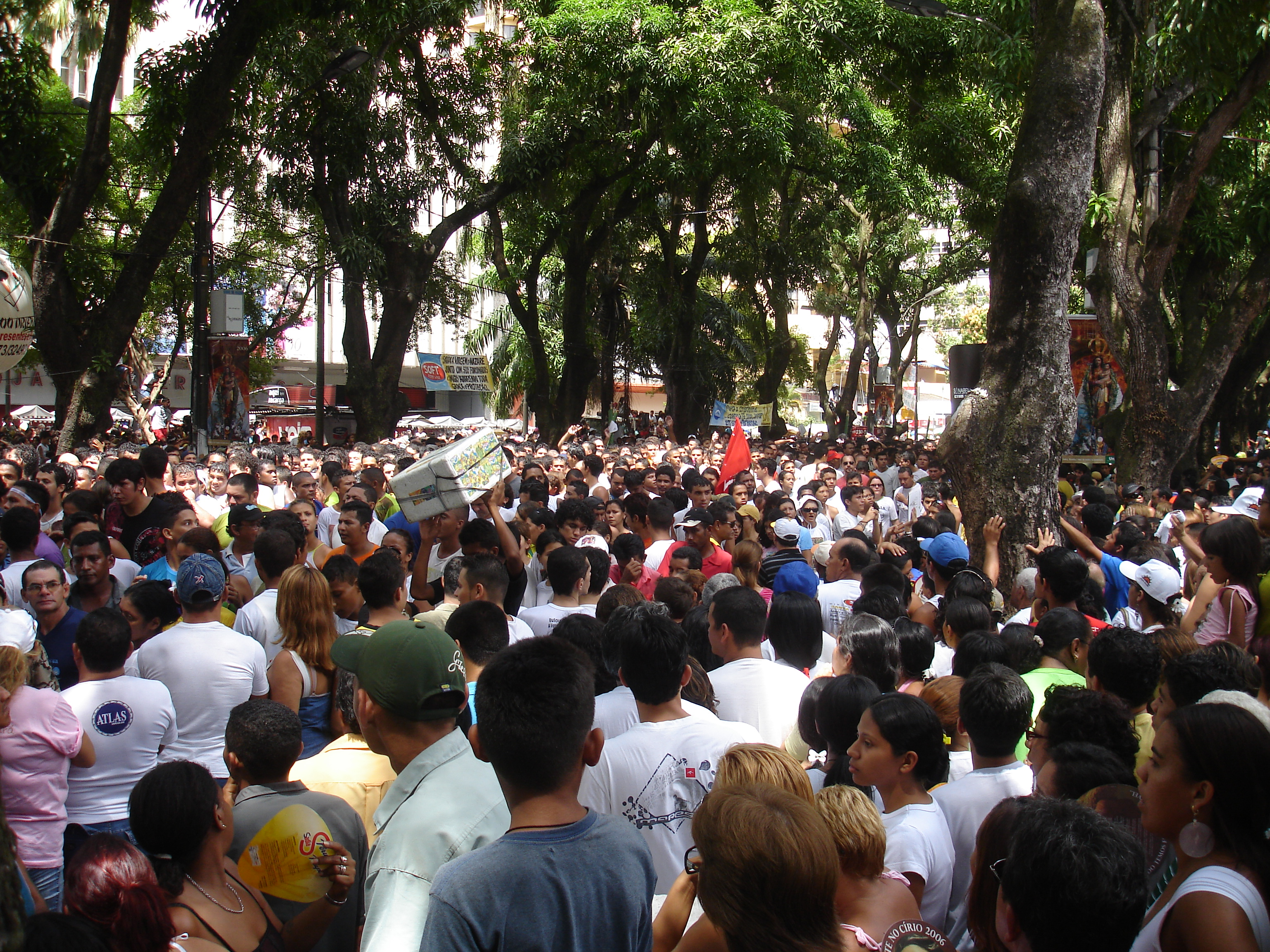
Procession passing through Presidente Vargas Avenue

== See also ==
- Basilica of Our Lady of Nazareth of Exile
- Our Lady of Grace Cathedral, Belém
