= Legend of Nazaré =

Portuguese legend from the Middle Ages

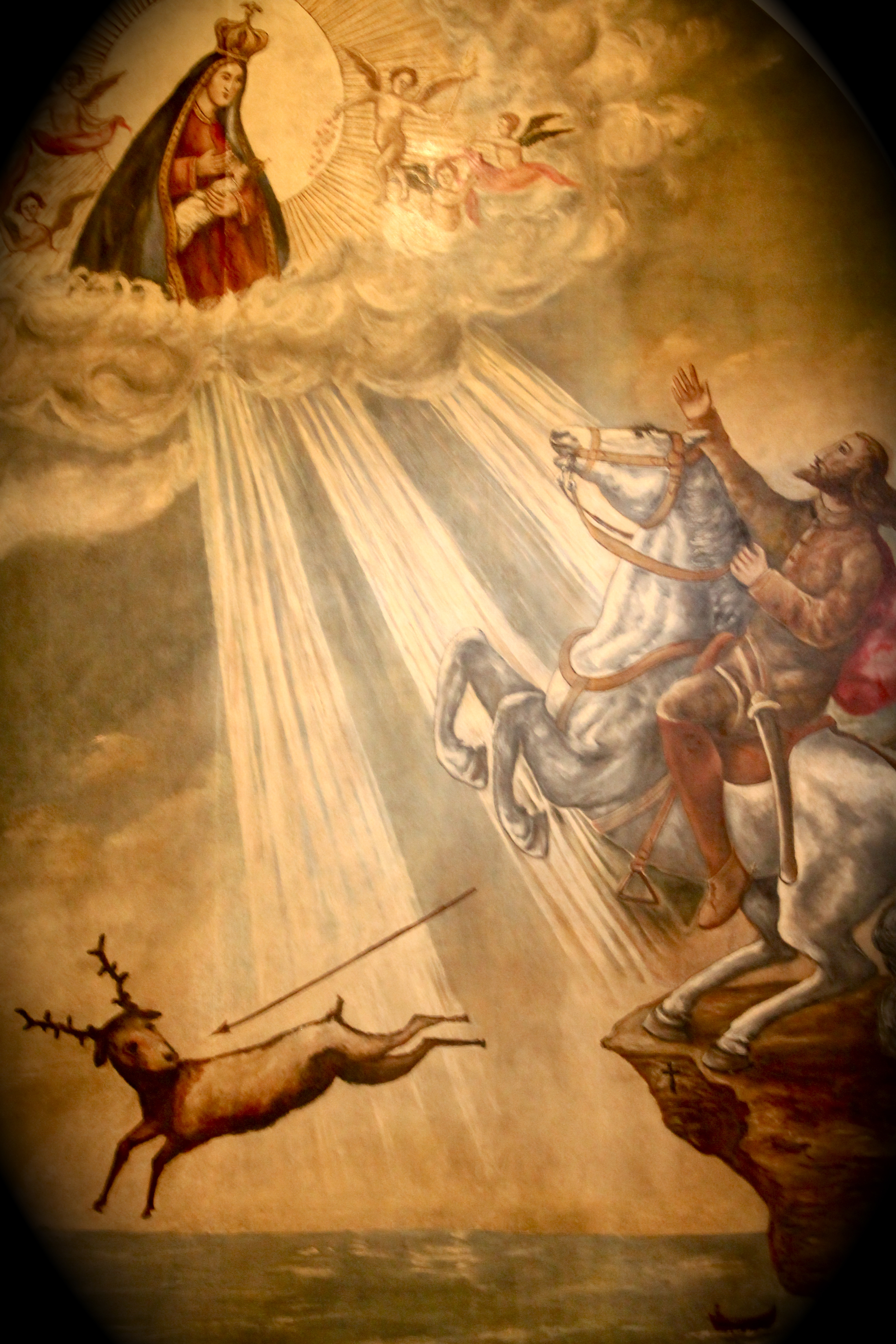
Representation of the miracle occurred with Dom Fuas Roupinho.

Portuguese: Senhora, Valei-me!

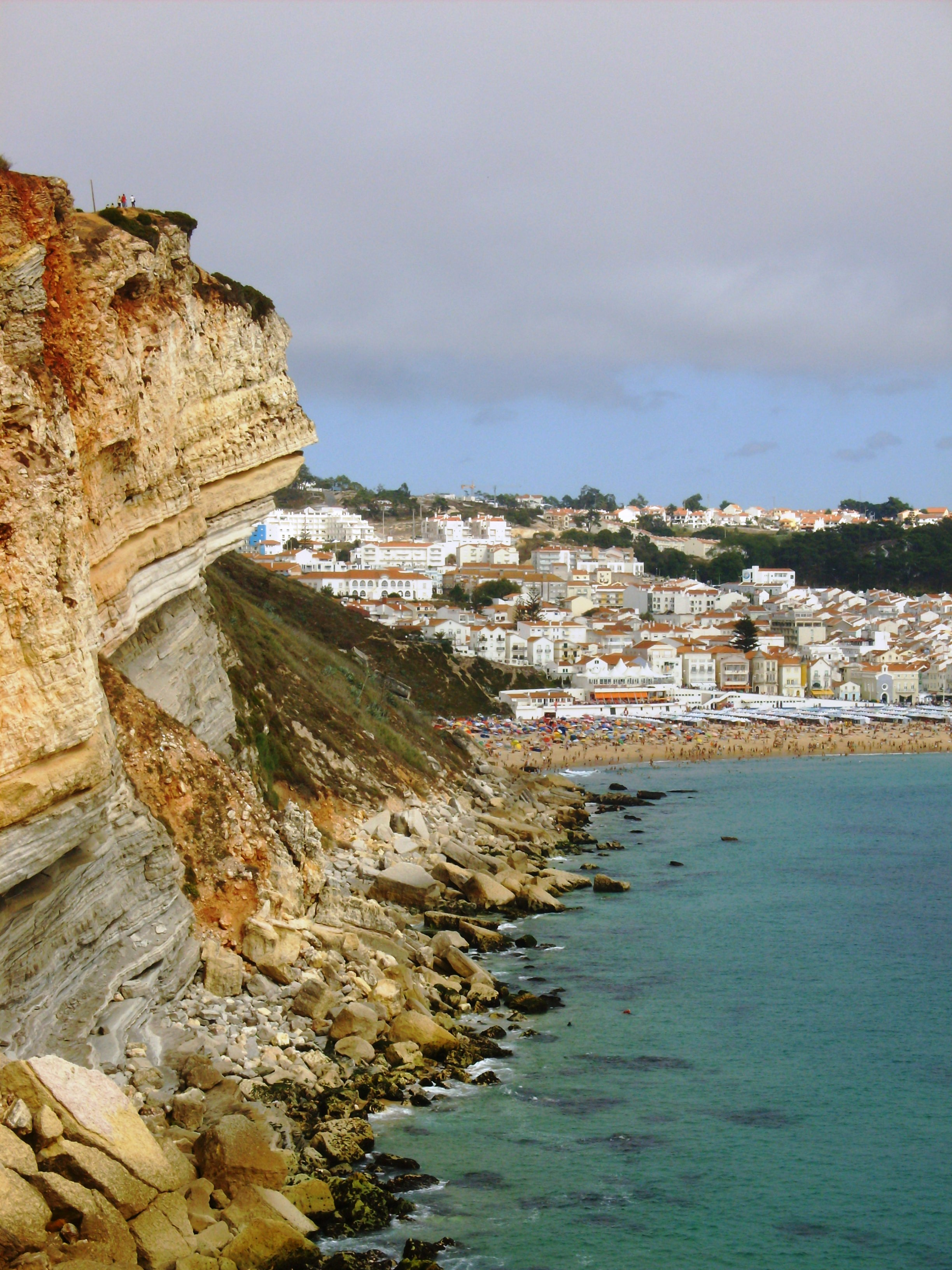
Nazaré, the cliff.

The Legend of Nazaré is a legend from Portuguese Middle Ages, centered in the town of Nazaré, Portugal. The tale includes Catholic elements of faith and divine intervention by Mary, mother of Jesus. The legend discusses the foundation of the Sanctuary of Our Lady of Nazaré and the alleged origins of the statue of Our Lady of Nazaré.

== Further history ==
The main altar

In 1377 because of the increased number of pilgrims, Fernando I of Portugal had a church built near the chapel and transferred the statue there. At the end of the sixteenth century, this church experienced the first of a series of reconstructions and enlargements. The existing building is the result of several interventions from the sixteenth to the nineteenth centuries. It is named Santuário de Nossa Senhora da Nazaré (Sanctuary of Our Lady of Nazaré).

== See also ==
- Memory Hermitage of Nazaré
