= Basilica of Our Lady of Nazareth of Exile =

Coordinates: 1.4527°S 48.4811°W

- Basílica Nossa Senhora de Nazaré do Desterro
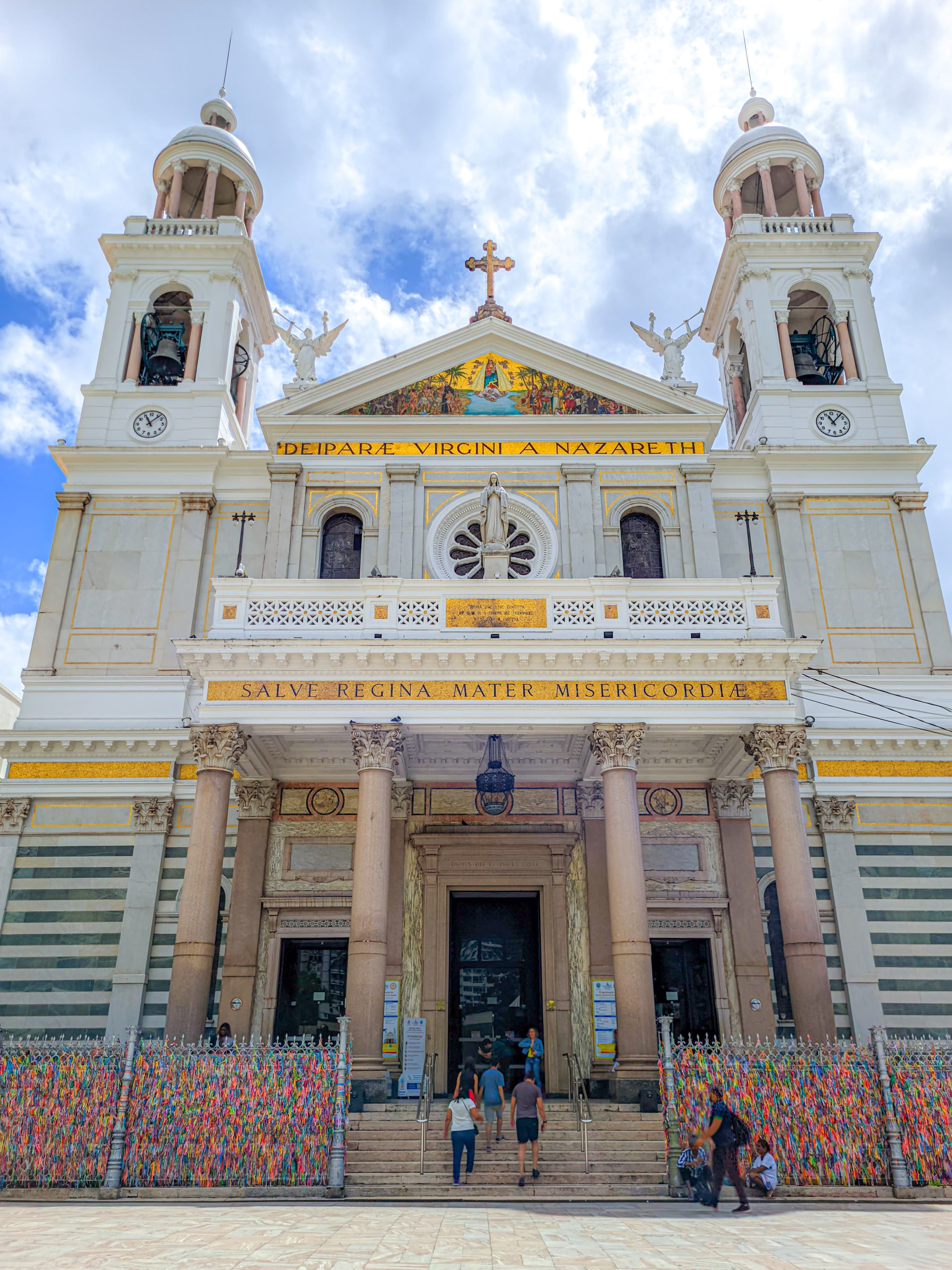
- Basilica of Our Lady of Nazareth of Exile
- Location: Belém, Brazil
- Country: Brazil
- Denomination: Roman Catholic Church

Architecture
- Style: Predominantly Neoclassical and eclectic

Specifications
- Length: 62 metres (203 ft)
- Width: 24 metres (79 ft)
- Height: 20 metres (66 ft)

Administration
- Archdiocese: Roman Catholic Archdiocese of Belém do Pará

The Basilica of Our Lady of Nazareth of Exile (also the Basilica of Belém; Portuguese: Basílica Nossa Senhora de Nazaré do Desterro) is a minor basilica of the Catholic Church located in the city of Belém, Pará, Brazil. Its construction started in 1909 at the place where the image of the Virgin of Nazareth was found by Plácido José de Souza (whose origins are controversial, with different versions) in the state of Pará, on the banks of the Murututu Igarapé.

The current structure of the basilica was designed in 1909 by Gino Coppedè, and was commissioned by Barnabite priests of the Genoa house. Coppedè planned the structure as a basilica rather than a parish church. It followed the design of Basilica of Saint Paul Outside the Walls in Rome, an eclectic, Neoclassical, 19th-century structure by Pasquale Belli and Luigi Poletti. Coppedè's design, controversially, had no steeples. As with Church of Saint Anne, designed by the Italian architect Landi, dual bell towers were added despite the intent of the architect. The municipal government of Belém argued that all churches in the Lusophone world should have two steeples. The cornerstone was placed on October 24, 1909, by the then Archbishop of Belem, Santino Maria Coutinho.

The basilica measures 62 metres (203 ft) long, 24 metres (79 ft) wide, and 20 metres (66 ft); its towers reach and additional 42 metres (138 ft) high. It has nine bells, the largest of which weighs more than 2 tons and is 1.8 metres (5.9 ft) in diameter.

Pope Pius XI declared the temple a basilica on 19 July 1923. Pope Pius XII granted a decree of pontifical coronation to its venerated Marian image on 9 July 1953 and was crowned on 15 August the same year. Pope Benedict XVI then elevated to the status of the Archdiocesan Marian Sanctuary on 31 May 2006, becoming the Basilica Sanctuary of the Virgin of Nazareth.

== Protected status ==
The Basilica of Our Lady of Nazareth was listed as a historic structure by the Department of Historic, Artistic and Cultural Heritage (DPHAC) of the state of Pará in 1992.

== See also ==
- Roman Catholicism in Brazil
- Our Lady of Nazareth

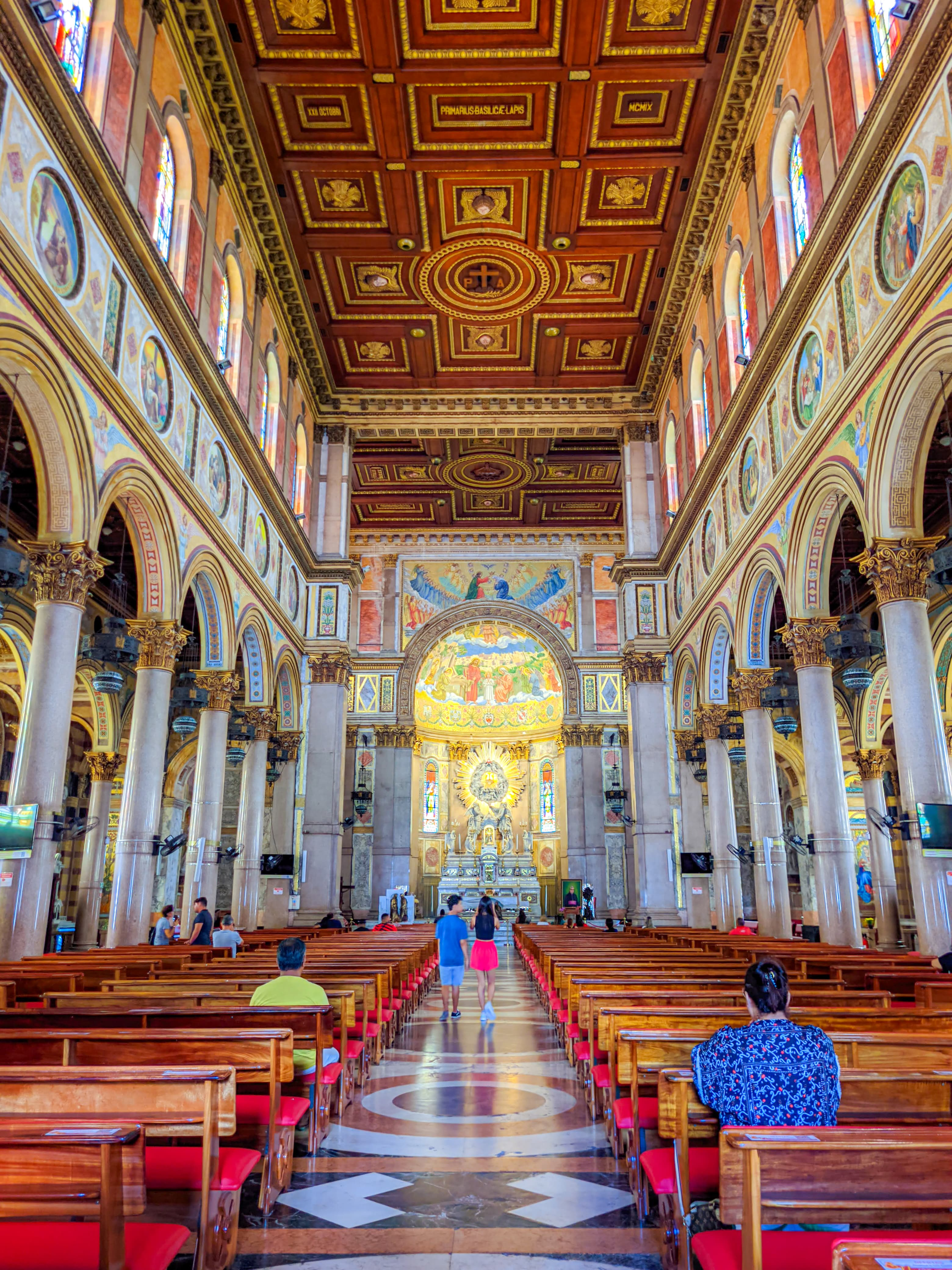
Internal view
