= Ermida da Memória da Nazaré =

Memory Hermitage
- Ermida da Memória
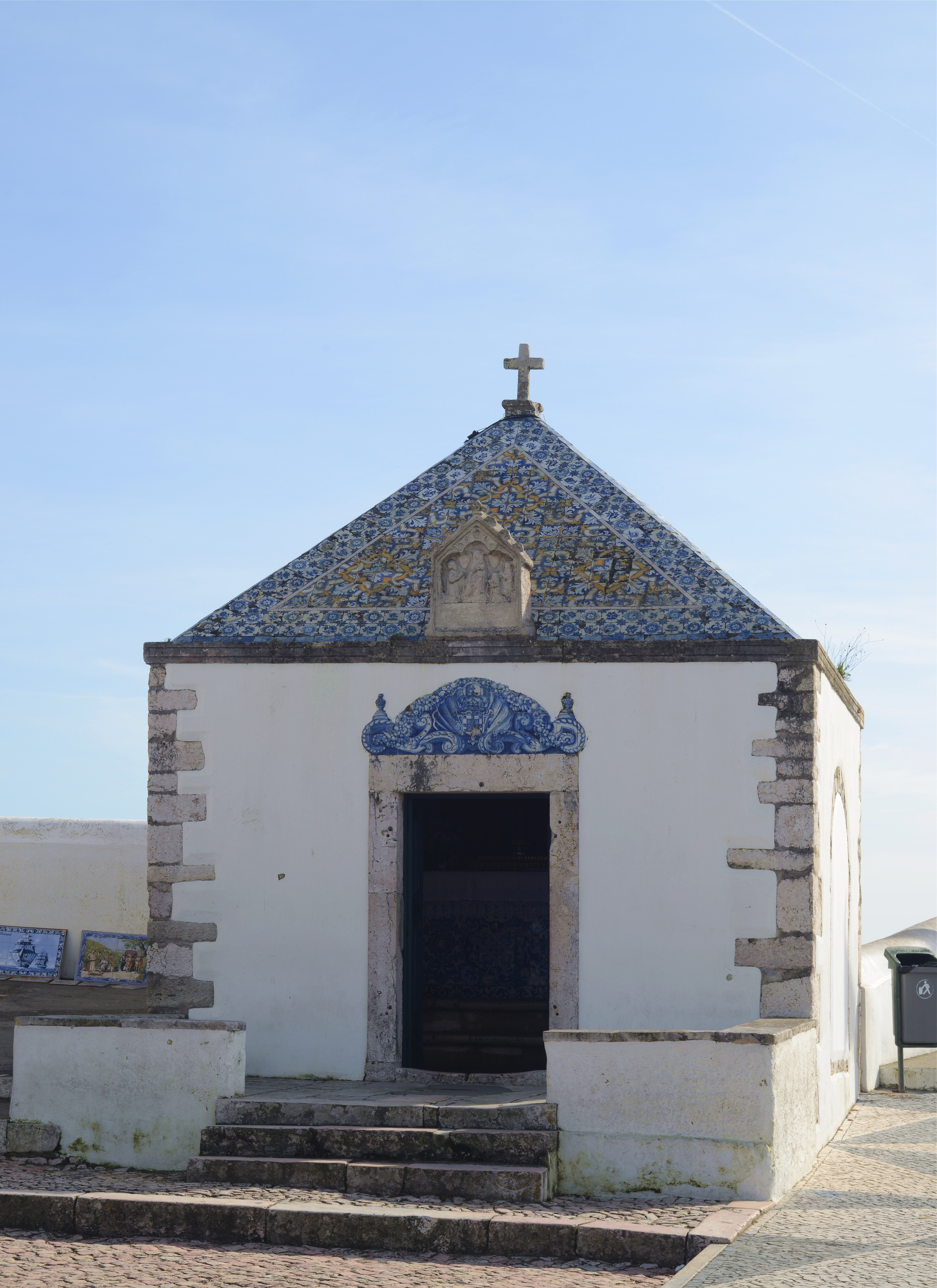
- Memory Hermitage
- 39°36′17″N 9°04′34″W
- Location: Nazaré
- Country: Portugal

History
- Status: Property of Public Interest

Administration
- Diocese: Patriarchate of Lisbon

Memory Hermitage, also known as the Chapel of Our Lady of Nazaré (Portuguese: Ermida da Memória / Capela de Nossa Senhora da Nazaré), is located on the edge of promontory in Nazaré, Portugal. It is a four-sided chapel decorated with blue and white tiles and has a pyramidal roof.

== History ==
According to the legend, Memory Hermitage was built by the order of the knight Dom Fuas Roupinho in 1182 after Our Lady of Nazaré saved him from falling off the cliff when he was following a deer on a horse. It happened where the original statue of Our Lady, sculpted by St. Joseph in her presence and then painted by St. Luke, was placed next to a small altar by Roderic, king of the Visigoths. The statue was brought to this place by Roderic in 714 along with a monk named Romano from the monastery located near the city of Mérida after the Battle of Guadalete. When the monk died, Roderic placed the statue on an altar in the grotto where the monk was buried. Therefore, the statue was preserved during centuries of Muslim rule in this region. This image was found in a cave in 1179 over which D.F. Roupinho had the hermitage constructed in 1182 on the edge of the cliff. In 1616 a historian of the Kingdom, Bernardo de Brito, visited Sitio to fulfill a vow, where he attempted to find the cave the image was found from. He excavated the basement of the Chapel with the help of other devotees, and succeeded in finding the cave. According to the legends, whoever attempted to go too far inside the cave, disappeared. Once a priest accompanied by his dog tried to enter the cave attached to a long rope and never came back, so a wall was built to prevent access to the remotest part of the cave and grids were placed in its entrance. Visitors can only see the entrance of the cave on which there is a niche the image of Our Lady placed.

== Features ==
=== Exterior ===
The ramparts of the first chapel were open with four arches to make the image visible from 4 sides, also from land and sea. Considering its deterioration, Ferdinand I ordered to close them in 1370. Above the entrance door there is a panel of tiles illustrating the coat of arm of Portugal. On the cornice of the hermitage there is a bas-relief from limestone which is the replica of the original one of 14th century. It's depicting Virgin of Nazaré with the Child in the arms, St. Brás and St. Bartholomew on the right, and Dom Rodrigo and monk Romano on the left. The original bas-relief is in the Rector Luis Nesi Museum functioning under the Sanctuary. The facade of the Chapel opposite to the beach Nazaré is decorated with the panel of tiles, illustrating episodes from the legend.

=== Interior ===
The interior part of the Hermitage is decorated with tiles from the 17th century. Master António Oliveira Bernardes added tiles of single figure and several Marian symbols. There are two floors inside the Hermitage linked with 6 steps stair made from lioz. The lower floor is lighted with the small window which is illuminating the place of the original statue. In the vault of the crypt, there is a tile panel illustrating the miracle about how Our Lady of Nazaré saved Knight D.Fuas Roupinho. On both sides of entrance there are two inscription scraped on the lioz wall. The inscription on the right is composed of the text by Monk Bernardo de Brito, transcribed from the "Monarquia Lusitana" in Latin, referring to Our Lady of Nazaré and to the origin of its cult in these places. The second inscription is a translation of the first one. The image of Our Lady of the Conception was removed from the altar and is being kept in the Rector Luis Nesi Museum with the aim to preserve it.

== Gallery ==
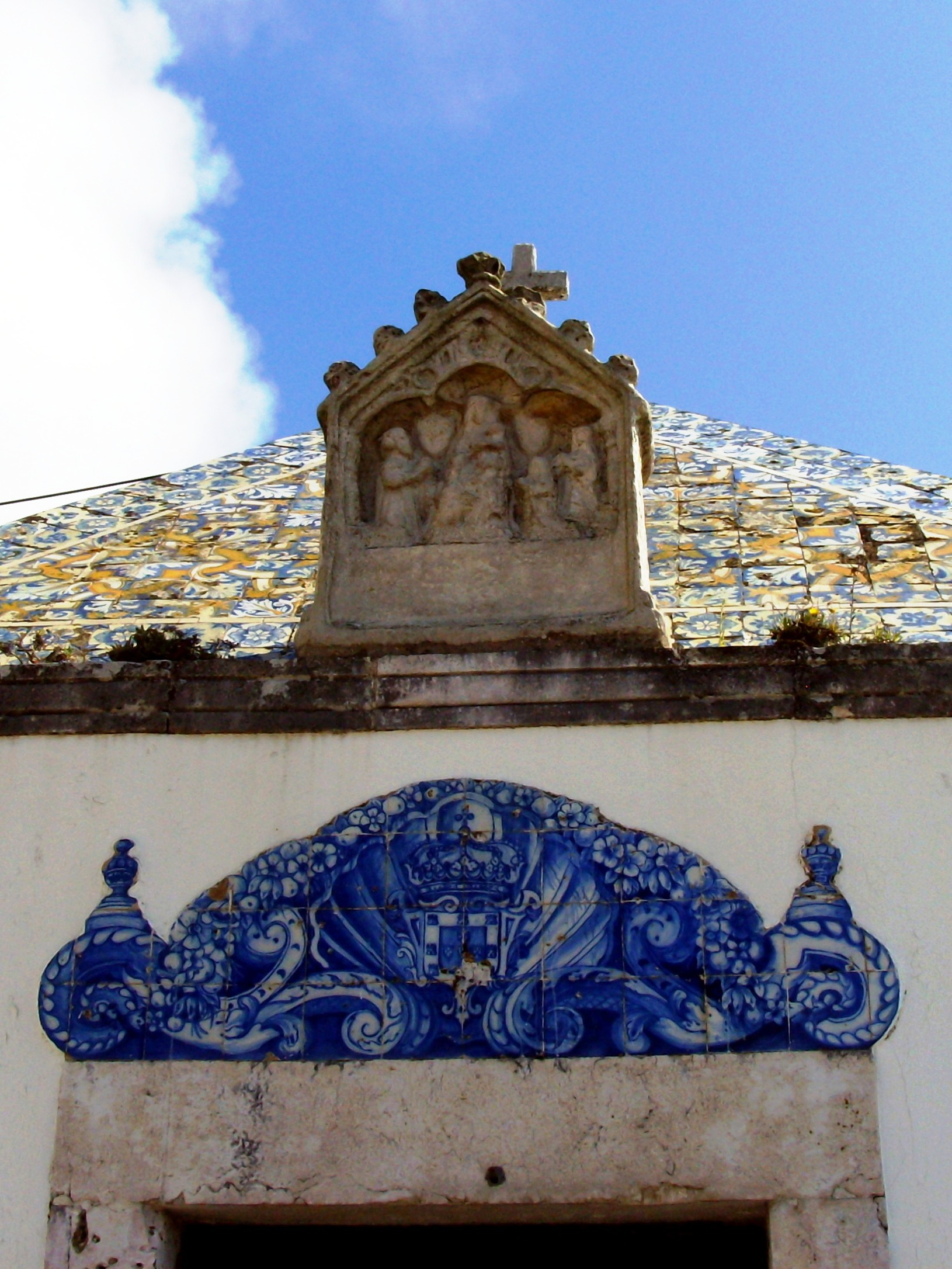
Entrance of the Memory Hermitage of Nazare

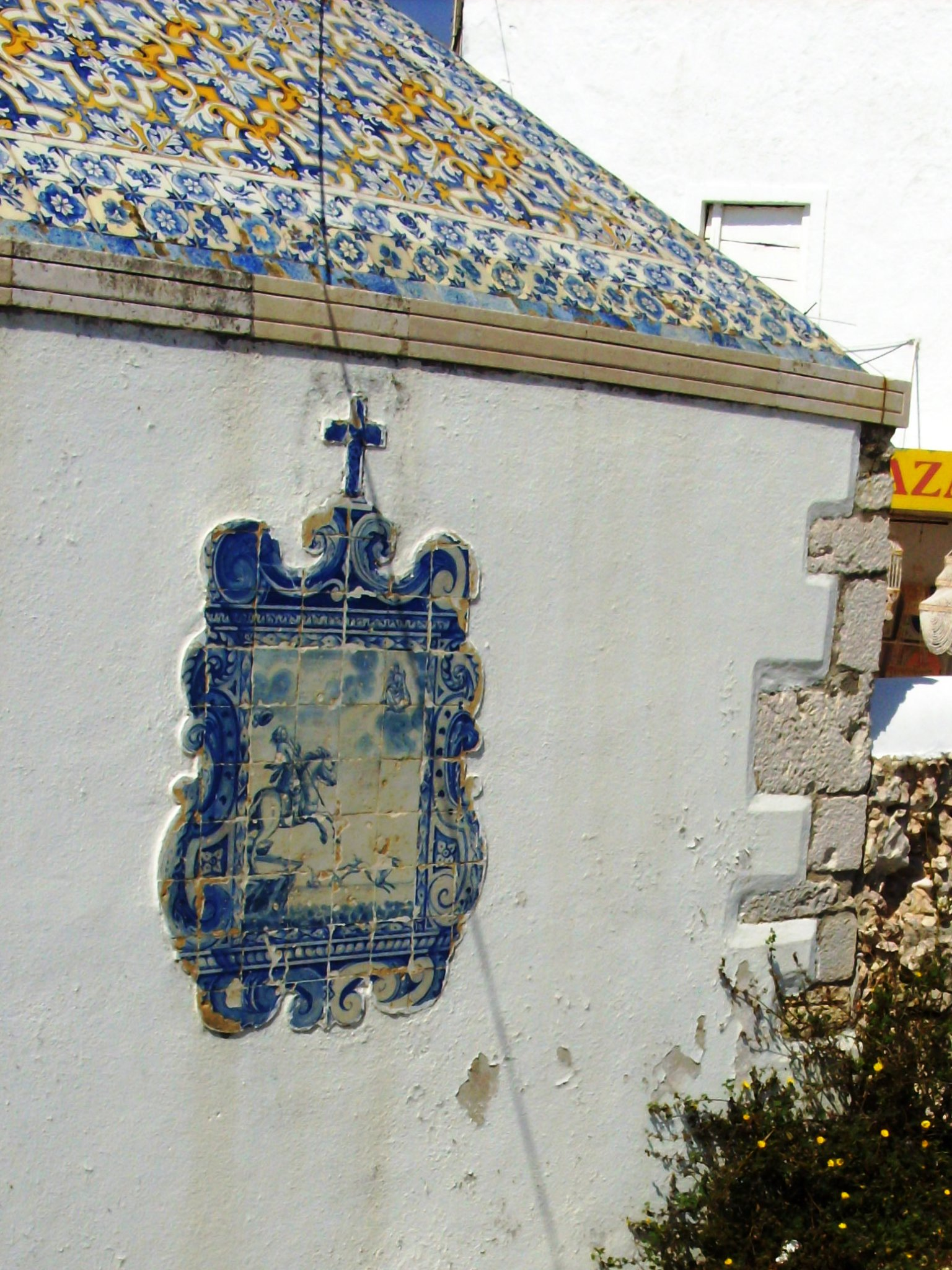
Facade of the Memory Hermitage of Nazare

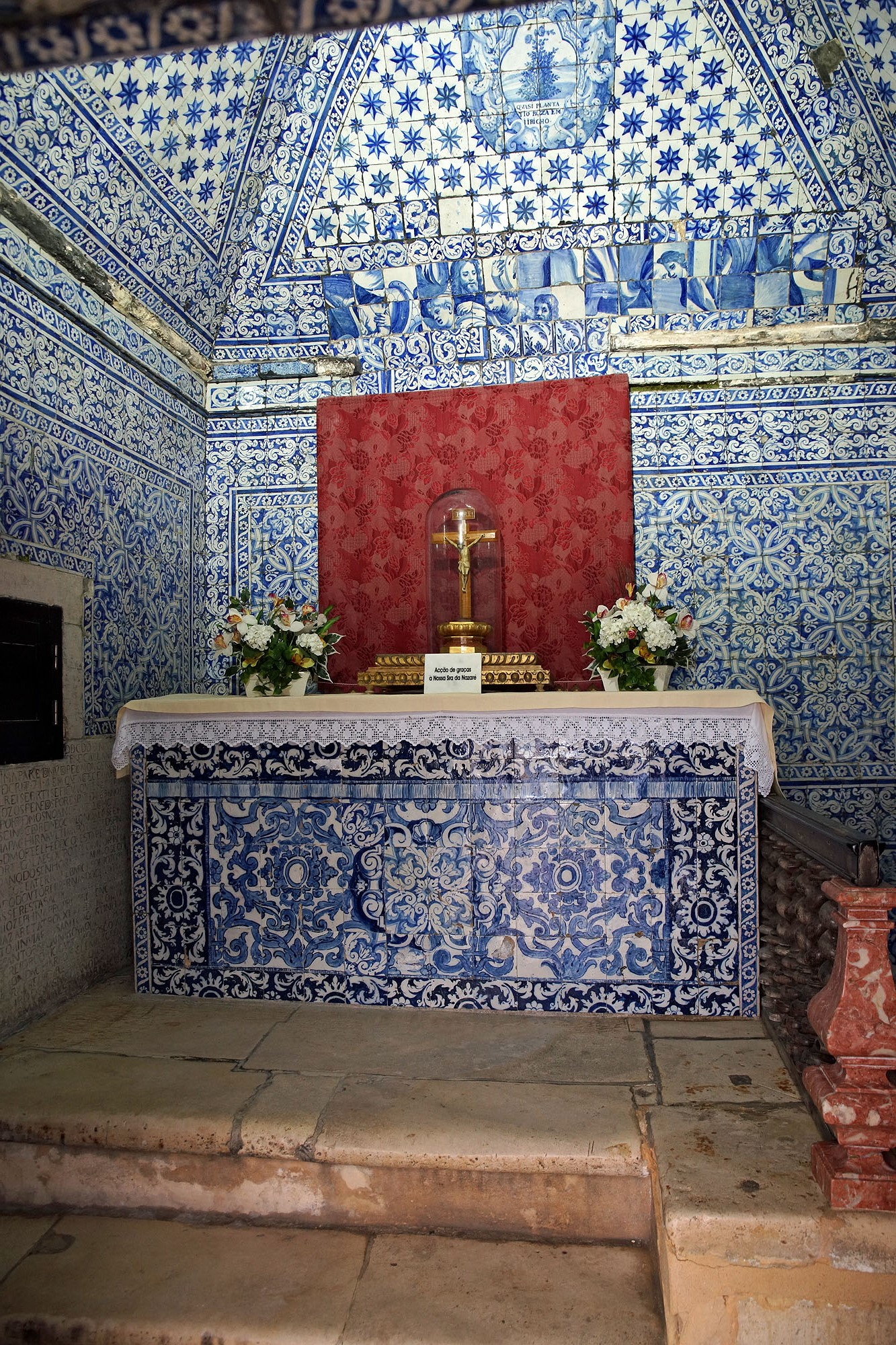
Inside the Memory hermitage

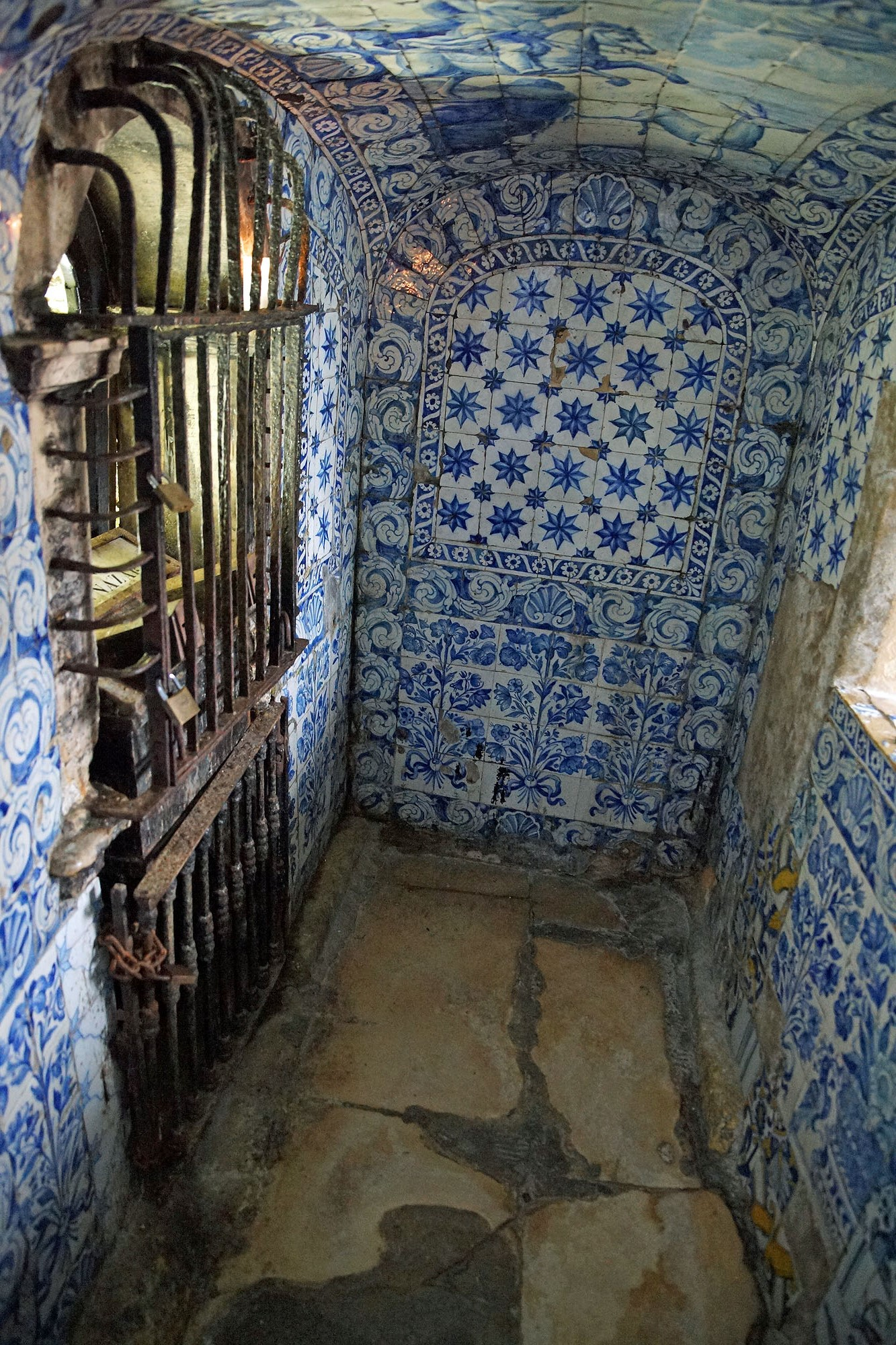
Lower floor of the Memory Hermitage

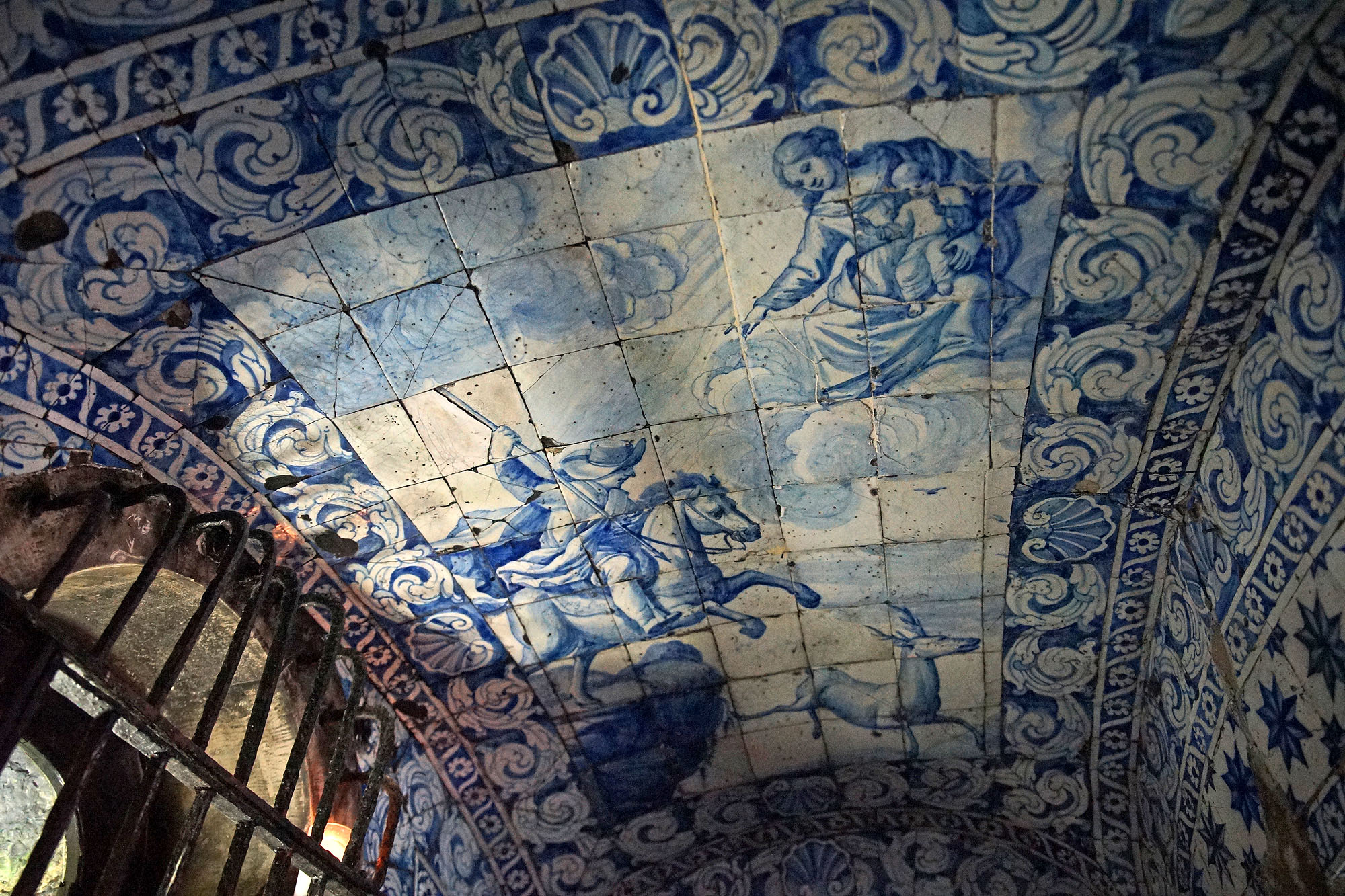
Panel of tiles illustrating the legend

== See also ==
- Legend of Nazaré
- Sanctuary of Our Lady of Nazaré
