= Sanctuary of Our Lady of Nazaré =

- Church of Our Lady of Nazaré
- Santuário de Nossa Senhora da Nazaré/Igreja de Nossa Senhora da Nazaré
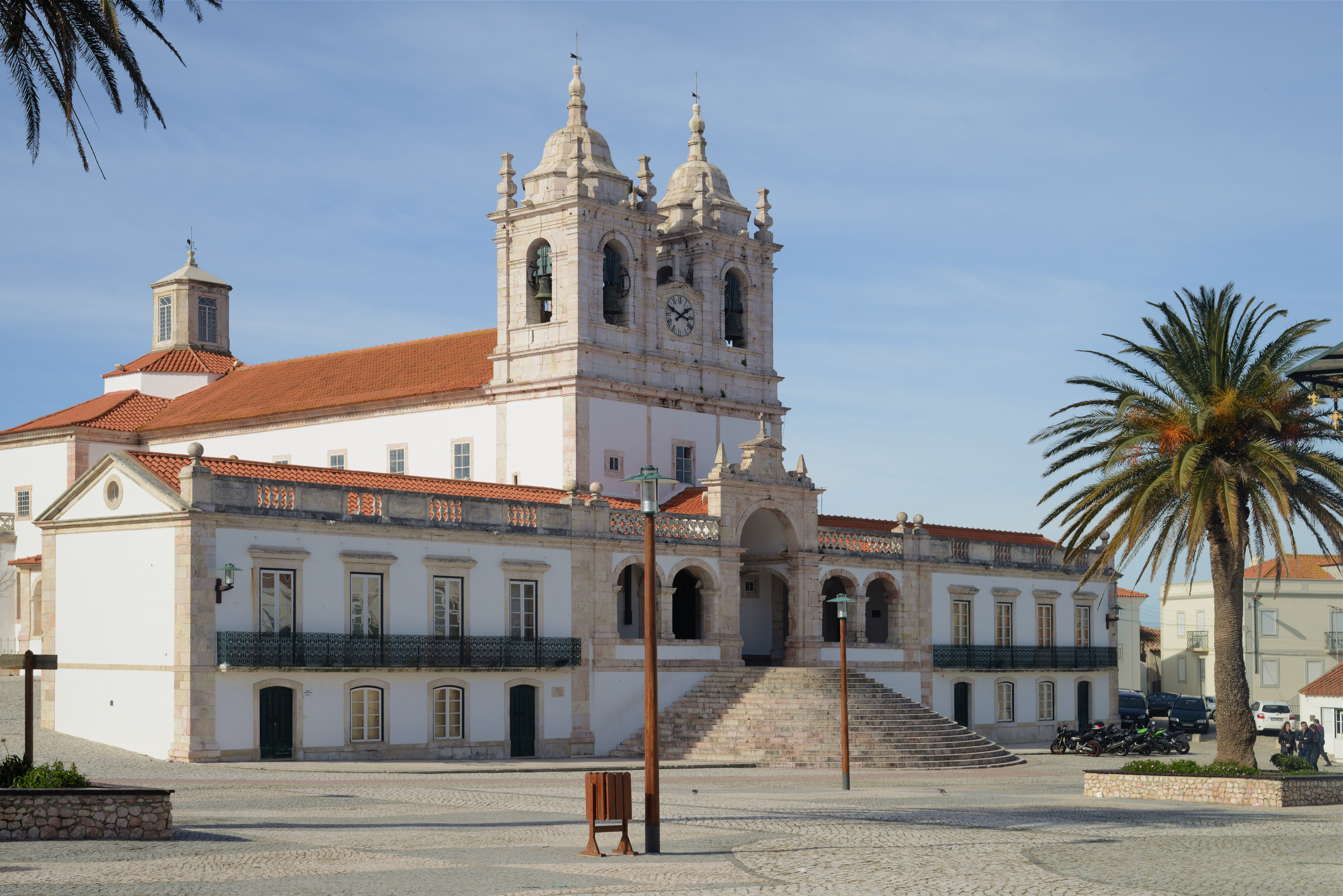
- Sanctuary of Our Lady of Nazaré
- 39.6055°N 9.0767°W
- Location: Nazaré
- Country: Portugal

History
- Status: Property of Public Interest

Architecture
- Style: Baroque

Administration
- Diocese: Patriarchate of Lisbon

The Sanctuary of Our Lady of Nazaré is a Marian shrine that memorializes an ancient miracle that occurred under the intercession of the Virgin Mary. It is located on the hilltop called O Sítio, overlooking Nazaré, in Portugal, and was founded in the 14th century.

== Overview ==
=== Construction ===
The church was founded in the 14th century on the occasion of the arrival of King Ferdinand on a pilgrimage to Our Lady of Nazaré. The king ordered works in the Ermida da Memoria, and decided to construct a new and improved place of cult, since the Hermitage did not have capacity to receive higher number of devotees of the Lady.

There were done some royal modifications on the temple, as Dom João I ordered some wooden porches. Dom João II remodeled the temple plan with enlarging it and building a new main chapel. King Manuel I replaced the wooden porches with some that remain up to the present day. The Church underwent various reformulations, especially in the main chapel. In the reign of Philip II, the portico was renovated and a new staircase was built. At the request of the Administrative Board, King Afonso VI ordered to do some renovation in Sanctuary. Changes were made in the structure of the temple, as the arch of the main chapel was enlarged and a new transept was added. The work was finished in 1691 and a Latin cross, similar to the current one was set in the church. In 1717 temple's front was renovated, and a new access to the belfry was constructed, which has two towers now. When the transept was built, the rector Father António Caria commissioned a Dutch company to add tile panels for the decoration of this new space. Before the end of 1708 Father Caria received the drawings and plans of the tiles for approval by the Administrative Board of the Royal House. In October 1709, the 6, 568 tiles by Dutch ceramist Williem Van der Klöet, with biblical episodes of Joseph and David and two scenes from Jonah's story, arrived at Sitio.

=== Interior design ===
The single nave in the shape of Latin cross is covered with a wooden painted ceiling. There is a painting on canvas at the entrance of the nave on the left, illustrating the legend of the appearance of Our Lady of Nazareth to D. Fuas Roupinho. The high altar is made of gold-toned altarpiece with marbled and Solomonic columns of the late 17th century. There is a small window on the Throne illustrating image of Nursing Madonna with the Child on her lap. The figures are crowned by diadems of 18th century, presented to the church by D. João VI. The sacred image is wrapped with a green cloak decorated with gold gifted to the Virgin by D.João V. The figures are crowned by diadems of 18th century, presented to the church by D. João VI. The sacred image is wrapped with a green cloak decorated with gold gifted by King John V to the Virgin. The main chapel is separated from the body of the church with an arcade made from pau-santo and a few pillars decorated with mosaic Italian marble of 19th century. The corridors of the Sacristy were covered with blue and white tiles by the Portuguese master António de Oliveira Bernardes in 1714. One of the panels illustrates the "Assumption of the Virgin", with symbols of Marian iconography. The remaining tiles in the corridors of the Sacristy were decorated by the master Manuel Borges.

== Gallery ==
Main façade and entrance steps

Nave looking towards the chancel

Chancel and high altarpiece

Nave looking towards the upper choir and organ

Azulejo panels in the right transept

Detail of the vault and gilded decoration of the arch

Sacristy with crucifix altar, paintings and chests

Stone washbasin in an azulejo-lined room

Vaulted corridor lined with azulejos

== See also ==
- Memory Hermitage of Nazaré
