= Chronological list of saints in the 9th century =

A list of people, who died during the 9th century, who have received recognition as Blessed (through beatification) or Saint (through canonization) from the Catholic Church:

Name	Birth	Birthplace	Death	Place of death	Notes
Anselm of Nonantola			803		
Maurontus			804		Abbot of The Abbey of St Victor; Bishop of Marseilles; venerated as a Saint by the Eastern Orthodox Church; descendant of Maurontius
Paulinus of Aquileia	726		804		
Urbitius (Urbez)			805		
Martyrs of Iona			806	Iona	68 monks killed by Viking raiders
Tarasius			806		Bishop of Constantinople
Tanco (Tancho, Tatta)			808		Bishop of Verden
Ludger	743		809		Bishop of Munster
William of Gellone			812		
John of Constantinople			813		Patriarch of Constantinople
John of Pavia			813		Bishop of Pavia
Angilbert (Homer)			814		
Blessed Charlemagne	742		814		1700s by Pope Benedict XIV
Plato of Sakkoudion			814		
Geminus			815		
Theophanes and Companions			815		
Leo III			816		pope
Theophanes the Chronicler	758		817		
Athanasius of Nicomedia			818		
Michael the Confessor			818		Bishop of Synnada
Anne (Euphemianus)			820		
Benedict of Angers			820		Bishop of Angers
Emilian			820		Bishop of Cyzicus
Benedict of Aniane	750		821		
Eigil (Aegilius)			822		
Adolphus and John			824		
Óengus (Aengus, Dengus, "the Culdee")			824		
Paschal I			824		pope
Blaithmaic mac Flainn	750	Ireland	825	Iona	martyr
George of Amastris			825		Bishop of Amastris Amasra
Ida of Herzfeld			825		
Paulinus			826		Bishop of Sinigaglia
Theodore the Studite	759		826		
Adalhard (Adelard)	753		827		
Hildegrin			827		Bishop of Châlons-sur-Marne
Angelelmus			828		Bishop of Auxerre
Apollinaris of Monte Cassino			828		
Nicephorus			828		
Antonius of Sorrento			830		
Glastian			830		Bishop of Kinglassie
Ymar			830		
Ansegisus	770		833		Saxon holy woman who was killed by marauding Danes
Wite			c. 830	Dorset	
Deusdedit			834		
Etheldritha (Alfreda)			834		
Sirian Abrahamites			835		
Pomposa			835		
Aigulf (Ayoul, Benedict of Aniane)	c.745-750	France	821	Germany	Bishop of Bourges
Peter of Atroa	773		837		
Frederick			838		Bishop of Utrecht
Gunioc			838		
Nicetas of Constantinople			838		
Agobard, Archbishop of Lyon			840		
Ansovinus			840		Bishop of Camerino
Arnulf			840		
Bolcan (Olcan of Kilmayle)			840		Bishop of Derban
Paul			840		Bishop of Prusa
Theophylact			840		
Aldericus			841		
Theodore and Theophanes			841		
Bernard (Barnard)	778		842		
Ardo Smaragdus			843		
Gohardus and Companions			843		
Paulinus			843		Bishop of Capua
Hildeman			844		Bishop of Beauvais
Benedict of Macerac			845		
Fulk			845		
Theophylact (Theophilus)			845		Bishop of Nicomedia
Joannicus	754		846		
Deochar (Gottlieb, Theutger)			847		
Methodius I			847		
Martyrs of Amorion			848		
Adalgis			850		Bishop of Novara
Badulfus			850		
Lufthildis (Leuchteldis)			850		
Martyrs of Bulgaria			850		
Maura of Troyes			850		
Medraid (Merald, Merault)			850		
Simeon			850		
Wistan			850		
Blessed Diarmaid			851		Bishop of Armagh
Flora and Mary			851		
Isaac of Cordoba	824		851		
Mary of Cordoba			851		
Nunilo and Alodia			851		
Paul of St. Zoilus			851		
Perfectus			851		
Peter			851		
Sanctius (Sancho)			851		
Theodemir			851		
Christopher			852		
Emilas			852		
Fandila			852		
George			852		
Gumesindus			852		
Leovigild			852		
Nathalia			852		
Rogellus			852		
Anastasius XVII			853		
Benildis			853		
Columba of Cordoba			853		
Abundius			854		
Odulf (Odulphus)			855		
Sandila			855		
Aldric	800		856		
Argimirius			856		
Aurea			856		
Elias			856		
Rabanus Maurus	784		856	Winkel	Abbot of Fulda, Archbishop of Mainz
Roderick and Solomon			857		
Eulogius of Cordova			859		
Gosbert			859		Bishop of Osnabruck
Leocritia (Lucretia)			859		
Meinuph (Magenulf, Meinulf, Magenulpus, Meen)			857 or 859		
Abbo			860		Bishop of Auxerre
Athanasia			860		
Paschasius Radbertus	786		860		
Meinrad of Einsiedeln			861		
Swithin (Swithun)			862		Bishop of Winchester
Feredarius			863		
Theodoric of Cambraiarras			863		Bishop of Cambrai-Arras
Laura			864		
Ansgar (Anskar)	801		865		
James of Sasseau			865		
Hunger			866		Bishop of Utrecht
Raoul of Turenne (Raoul, Radulf)			866		Bishop of Bourges
Lazarus Zographos			867		
Convoyon			868		
Annobert			869		Bishop of Seez
Cyril			869		
Eberhard of Friuli			869		
Badilo			870		
Beocca			870		
Cearan (Ciaran)			870		
Ebba ("The Younger")			870		
Edmund	840		870		
Egelred			870		
Hedda			870		
Arnulf			871		Bishop of Toul
Athanasius I (bishop of Naples)			872		Bishop of Naples
Altfrid			874		Bishop of Hildesheim
Constantine			874		
Ado of Vienne	800		875		
Adrian and Companions			875		
Clarus			875		
Egilo (Eigil)			875		
Remigius			875		Archbishop of Lyon
Donatus			876		Bishop of Fiesole
Ignatius of Constantinople	797	Constantinople	877	Constantinople	Patriarch of Constantinople
Neot			877		
Fintan			879		
Andrew of Fiesloe (Andrew the Scot)		Ireland	880	Ireland	
Maimbod (Mainboeuf)			880		
Martyrs of Ebsdorf			880		
Odo I of Beauvais	801		880		Bishop of Beauvais
Solange (Solangia)			880		
Theodoric of Ninden			880		Bishop of Ninden
Victor			880		
Egilhard			881		
Bertharius			884		
Eusebius of St Gall			884		
Athanasius			885		Bishop of Modon
Gerebald			885		Bishop of Chalon-sur-Saône
Hiero (Iero)			885		
Methodius			885		Bishop of Pannonia
Ansbald			886		
Joseph the Hymnographer			886		
Meriadoc (Meriasec)			886		Bishop of Vannes
Ansuinus			888		
Fidweten			888		
Gibardus			888		
Rembert			888		Archbishop of Hamburg-Bremen
Leo of Carentan	856		890		
Vintila			890		
Theodard (Audard)			893		
Aurelian			895		
Richardis	840		895		
Alfred the Great	849		899		
Amelberga of Susteren			900		
Benedict Revelli			900		Bishop of Albenga
Cuthman			900		
Gauderic			900		
Lambert of Saragossa			900		
Leo Luke			900		
Leo			900		Bishop of Rouen

== See also ==
- Christianity in the 9th century
