= Sisenandus of Beja =

Christian deacon and martyr

Saint Sisenandus of Beja
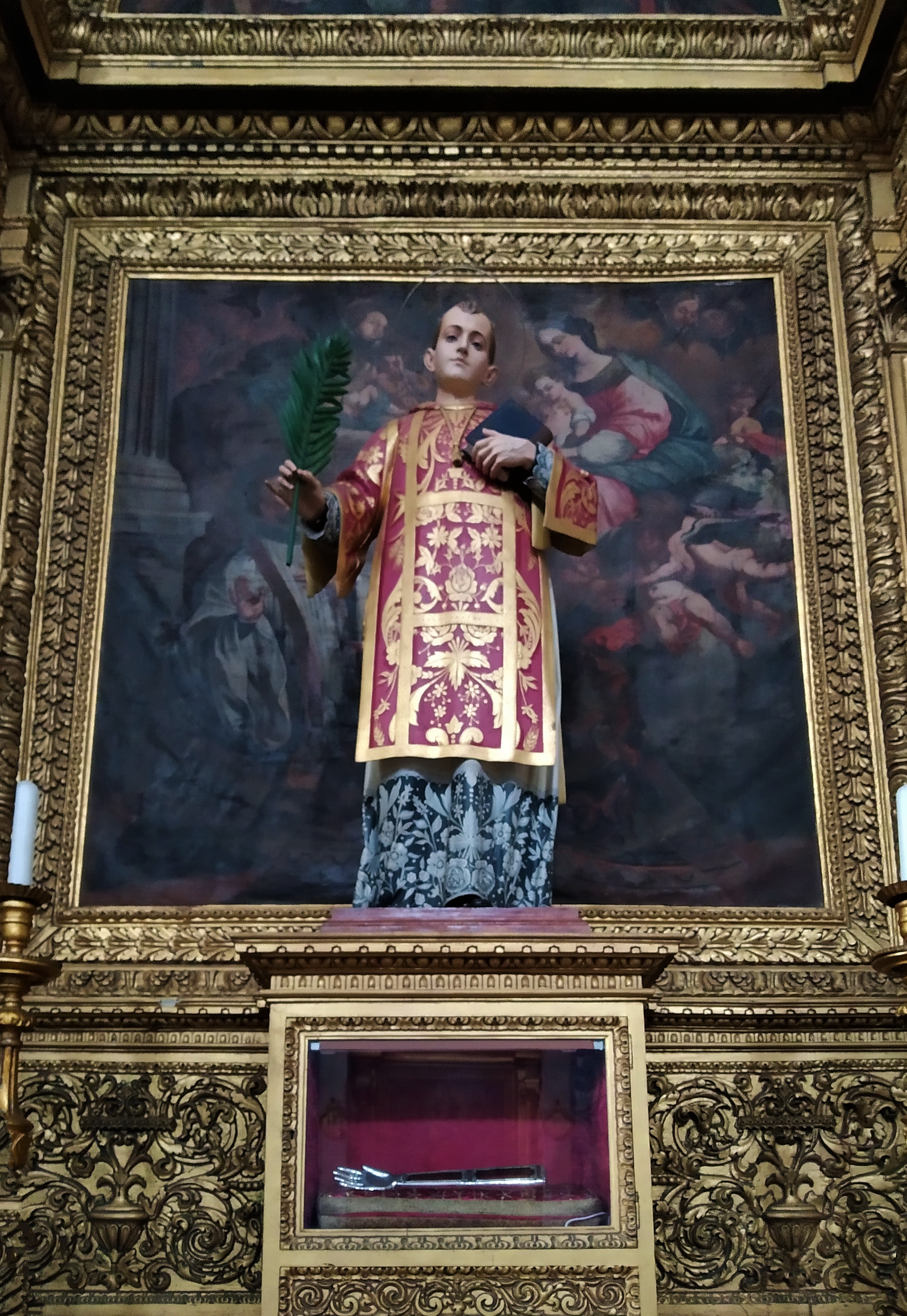
- Image and relic of Saint Sisenandus in Beja Cathedral, in Beja

Deacon and Martyr
- Born: c. 825; Baja, Al-Andalus (modern-day Beja, Portugal)
- Died: 16 July 851; Córdoba, Al-Andalus
- Canonized: 13 February 1598 by Pope Clement VIII (cultus confirmed)
- Major shrine: Cathedral of the Sacred Heart of Jesus, Beja
- Feast: 24 October

Sisenandus of Beja (Portuguese: Sisenando; died 16 July 851) was a Christian deacon and martyr who was put to death during the reign of Abd al-Rahman II, Emir of Córdoba, and is counted among the Martyrs of Córdoba.

== Life ==
Most of what is known about Sisenandus comes from Eulogius of Córdoba's coeval martyrology Memoriale Sanctorum. Its single known manuscript ended up forgotten for centuries in Oviedo Cathedral, until its rediscovery by Pedro Ponce de León, Bishop of Plasencia, who had it transcribed by historian Ambrosio de Morales and first published in 1574; interest in Sisenandus and the Martyrs of Córdoba at large only resurfaced after this date.

Sisenandus was born in an Iberian Peninsula under Islamic rule, after the Umayyad conquest of Hispania. Islamic authorities accorded Christians dhimmi status, which allowed them to practice their religion with certain restrictions, such as a prohibition on public displays of faith. These Christians, called Mozarabs, came to adopt elements of Arabic culture while retaining their own.

Juan Tamayo de Salazar, in his nationalistic Martyrologium Hispanum, mistakenly defends Sisenandus was born in modern-day Spain, under the erroneous premise that Pax Augusta was an ancient name for the city of Badajoz. Eulogius says he was from Beja ("denique leuita sanctissimus Sisenandus ex Pacensi oppido ortus"), and thence went to Córdoba as a young clerical student to conduct his studies at the Basilica of Saint Acisclus. There, he received Holy Orders as a deacon and as a fervorous preacher, soon after was arrested, tried, and martyred by order of Abd al-Rahman II, on 16 July 851. His remains were thrown into the Guadalquivir, and later salvaged and brought to the Church of San Pedro in Córdoba.

== Legacy ==
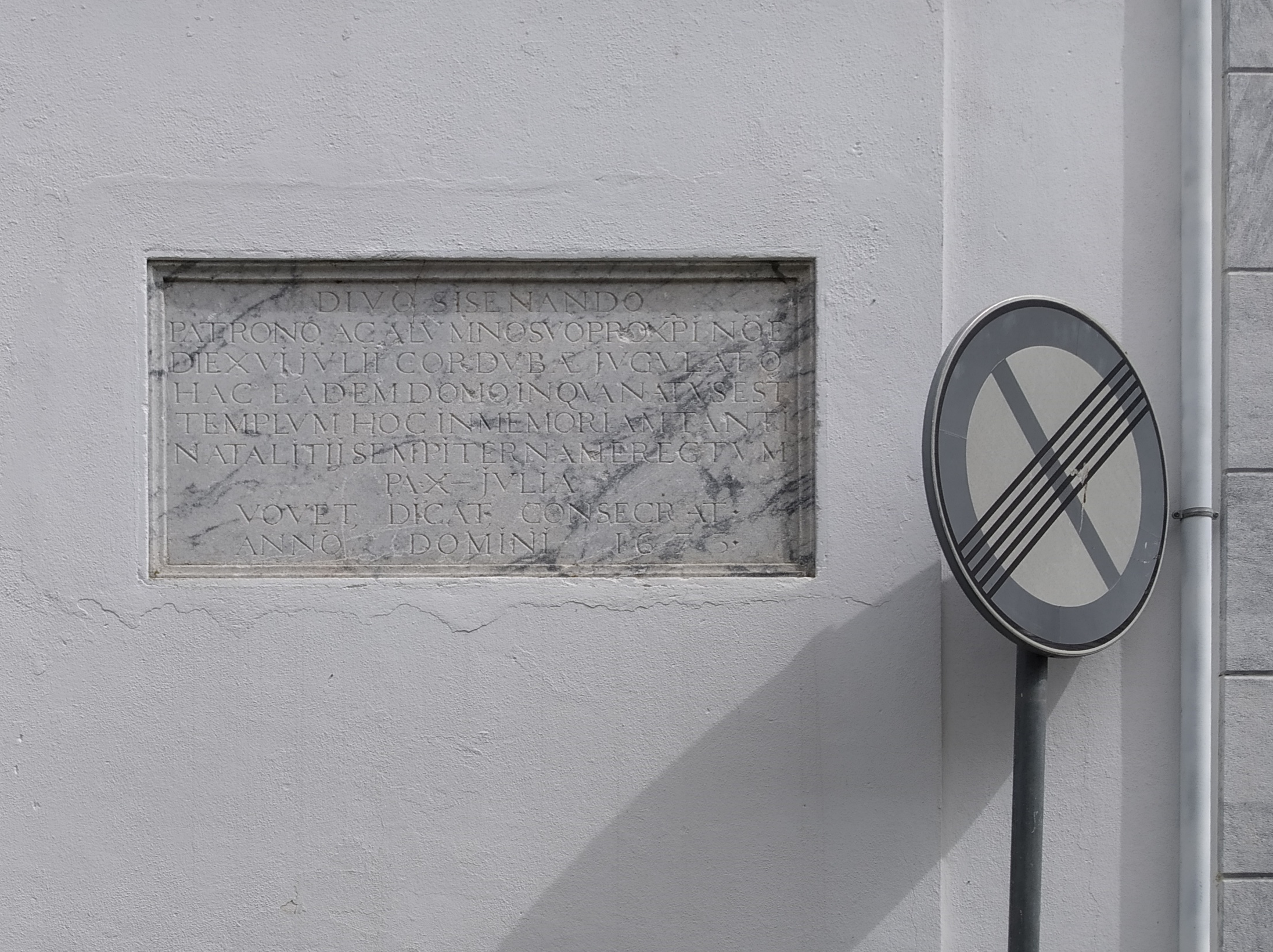
17th-century plaque marking the site of the chapel that formerly held Sisenandus's relics, in Beja.

After the first printed edition of Eulogius's Memoriale Sanctorum, there was renewed interest in the Martyrs of Córdoba. In the late 16th century, when Francisco de Reynoso y Baeza was Bishop of Córdoba, the city of Beja sent a delegation of procurators to ask the relics of Saint Sisenandus — or, at least, part of them — be brought to his birthplace; both the bishop and Philip II of Spain judged it a suitably devout demonstration of piety, and allowed a radial bone to be brought to Beja in the year 1600. The relic was at first kept under the tabernacle in the Church of Salvador, but then transferred to its own temple. As this chapel fell into disrepair and, eventually, abandonment, the relics were transferred to an altar in the Cathedral of St. James the Great, where they are kept to this day.

On 24 October 1651, Saint Sisenandus was decreed the patron saint of the city of Beja.
