= Flora and Maria =

Christian martyrs

Flora and María were the first two of nine female Christian Martyrs of Córdoba. After denouncing Islam before an Islamic judge, they were imprisoned. Though threatened "with being thrown upon the streets as prostitutes", they were eventually beheaded. They are commemorated on 24 November.

== Flora ==
Saint Flora of Córdoba
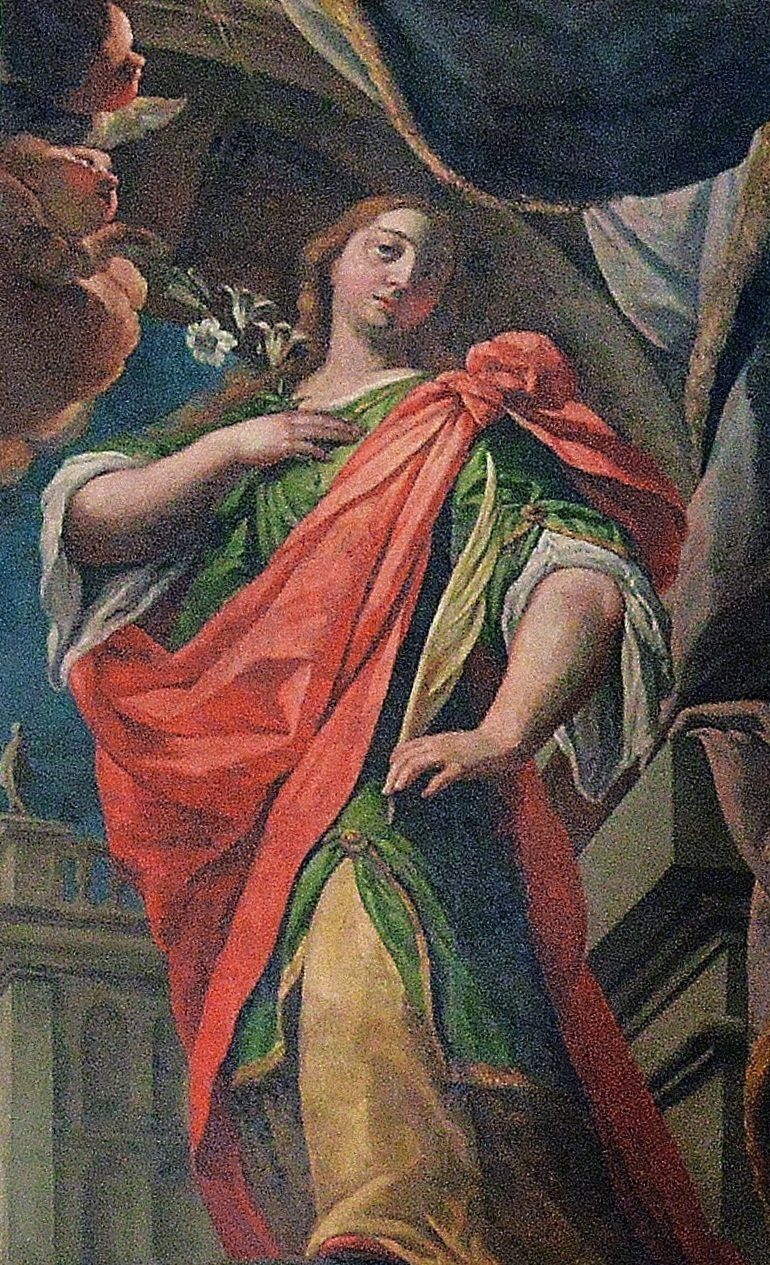
- Saint Flora depicted at the Mosque–Cathedral of Córdoba.

Virgin martyr
- Died: 24 November 851; Córdoba, Spain
- Cause of death: Executed by Beheading
- Venerated in: Roman Catholic Church
- Feast: 24 November

Saint Flora of Córdoba (Note: Also spelled as Flora of Cordova, Córdova, and Cordoue.) (Note: (Arabic: القديسة فلورا من قرطبة; Spanish: Santa Flora de Córdoba)) (died November 24, 851 AD) was a Mozarabic woman, she was venerated by the Roman Catholic Church as a virgin martyr, and was executed during the reign of Abd ar-Rahman II (r. 822–852).

Flora was born to an Islamic father and Christian mother, a native of Ausinianos. Her father died when she was young, and in turn, Flora and her sisters were brought up by her mother into Christianity. According to the hagiography by Eulogius of Córdoba, after Flora's elder brother asked her to convert to Islam, she refused and sought refuge elsewhere.

== María ==
María was born to a Christian father and Muslim mother. Her mother was baptised some time after she got married. Fearing charges of apostasy, the couple and their two children left their home in the town of Elche and moved to the village of Fronianus. María lost her mother at a young age, and her father sent her to convent in Cuteclara. The convent's abbess, Artemia, told María how she witnessed the execution of her two sons by the Muslim rulers thirty years prior. The story had a long-lasting impression on the girl.

María's older brother, Walabonsus, also received a religious education at the monastery of Saint Felix. The siblings, who were separated when María was sent to the convent and Walabonsus to the monastery, met again when Walabonsus was appointed one of the supervisors of María's convent. Walabonsus was executed by Muslim authorities on 16 July 851, and his martyrdom along with Artemia's story drove María to follow in her brother's footsteps.

== Imprisonment and martyrdom ==
Saint Flora (right) and Saint Pelagius (left)

Flora and María met at the church of Saint Acisclus. and decided to denounce Islam together. Before a Qadi (Islamic judge) Flora described how as a Christian she consecrated her virginity to god; they were subsequently imprisoned.

In jail, Flora was offered a full pardon if she "returned" to Islam, but she explained that the only beliefs she had ever held were Christian. This explanation was not accepted because according to Islamic law, a child born to even one Muslim parent should have adopted Islam as their religion. Sabigotho used to visit Flora and María in jail and once spent a night in their cell "as if she herself were shackled, not only to console the two soldiers, but to confide in them her own intention to die".

In accordance with Shari'a law, Flora and María were found guilty of two different crimes: Flora was executed for apostasy, and María for blasphemy. Before the executions, the young women were threatened "with being thrown upon the streets as prostitutes", which was an unbearable punishment for virgins. They were beheaded on 24 November 851.

Their bodies were left in the open for a day then thrown into the river. The body of María was recovered and taken to the convent, that of Flora was never recovered. Their heads were buried at the church of St Acisilus in Cordoba.

== Legacy ==
Flora and María were the first two of nine female Martyrs of Córdoba described by Eulogius of Córdoba in his Memorial of the Saints. Their example inspired other Christians to become martyrs.
