= Speraindeo =

Speraindeo (died 853) was a Córdoban Mozarabic abbot, teacher of Eulogius and Alvarus Paulus.

Few details are known about his life. He was the abbot of the Monastery of Santa Claire, near Córdoba, during the era of the emirate. Apart from his writing, he worked to conserve Latin Christian culture in Muslim territory. He was known for his audacity: his Apologetic against Muhammad — known only from fragments —, written during the most dangerous period of the Muslim invasion, condemned Christians who converted to Islam. Speraindeo's agitation of the Christian community in Córdoba resulted in an upwelling of religious fervor, and ultimately produced a wave of new martyrs collectively known as Martyrs of Córdoba. Among his disciples were Saint Eulogius, Alvarus Paulus, and Samson of Córdoba.
