= Saul of Córdoba =

Saul (Spanish: Saúl) was the bishop of Córdoba between 850 and 861.

Saul obtained the bishopric by means of simony. In a letter addressed to him, Paul Albar mentions the 400 solidi he had paid the eunuchs of the Umayyad emirate. Nevertheless, Eulogius of Córdoba praised him as a pastor in his Liber Apologeticus Martyrum.

Saul's episcopate coincided with the martyrs' movement in Córdoba. His metropolitan bishop, Reccafred, twice had him imprisoned for his sympathetic stance to the martyrs. On the first occasion in 851, he was imprisoned with Eulogius and many of his priests, as related by Paul Albar in his Vita Eulogii. He attended the council of Córdoba summoned by the emir in 852. There, while accepting the proposed prohibition on seeking martyrdom, he defended those who had already been killed. His second stint in prison, mentioned by Eulogius in his Memoriale Sanctorum, was spent alone. Saul took part in the burial and memorializing of the martyrs, as shown by Aimoin of Saint-Germain-des-Prés in his account of the translation of the relics of George, Aurelius and Natalia.

Saul left behind two writings in Latin: a letter on his "calamities" addressed to an anonymous bishop and a letter to Paul Albar dated 862. The latter is notable for a passage lumping together the Migetians of Saul's day with the Luciferians and Donatists, purists of centuries earlier. The three sects are labelled salsuginosas ('salty').

== Sources ==
- Cavadini, John C. (1993). The Last Christology of the West: Adoptionism in Spain and Gaul, 785–820. University of Pennsylvania Press. doi:10.9783/9781512801149.
- Gil, Juan, ed. (1973). Corpus Scriptorum Muzarabicorum. Vol. 2. Instituto Antonio de Nebrija.
- Isla Frez, Amancio (2020). "Migecianos, casianistas y la definición de una herejía (fin del siglo VIII – principio del IX)". Studia Historica. Historia Medieval. 38 (2): 189–219. doi:10.14201/shhme2020382189219. hdl:10366/146384. S2CID 234435024.
- Lara Olmo, Juan Carlos (1999). "El relato del traslado de los santos mártires Jorge, Aurelio y Natalia: un valioso escrito hagiográfico y documental histórico de mediados del siglo IX" (PDF). Hispania sacra. 51 (103): 55–89.
