= Recemundus =

Tenth-century Andalusian bishop and civil servant

Recemundus (Arabic: ربيع بن زيد الأسقف, romanized: Rabi ibn Sid al-Usquf or Rabi ibn Zaid, Castilian: Recemundo) was the Mozarabic bishop of Elvira and secretary of the caliph of Córdoba in the mid-10th century.

In 953, following a spate of undiplomatic letters between the two rulers, he served as ambassador for Abd al-Rahman III to German King (and future Holy Roman Emperor) Otto I. In Germany, he successfully normalised relations between the nominal rulers of Christendom and Islam(dom). It was while in Germany (956) that he met Liutprand of Cremona, the Italian bishop and diplomat, and convinced him to write a history of the times. The Antapodosis was dedicated to Recemundus.

Upon his return to Spain, he was rewarded with the vacant see of Elvira. He continued his work as an ambassador to Christendom, going to the other European emperor in Constantinople, and then to Jerusalem, the holiest city in the three great monotheistic faiths (Christianity, Islam, and Judaism).

In 961, Recemundus presented an Arabic calendar of Christian holidays (including some commemorating the Martyrs of Córdoba) to the new caliph, al-Hakam II.

== Sources ==
- Wintle, Justin. The Rough Guide History of Spain. Penguin Group, 2003.
- Gerli, E. Michael, ed. Routledge Encyclopedias of the Middle Ages: VIII Medieval Iberia, an Encyclopedia. "Recemund."
- Colbert, E. "The Martyrs of Córdoba (850–859): A Study of the Sources". Ph.D. Diss., Catholic University of America, 1962, 382–86.
- Dozy, R., ed. Le Calendrier de Cordoue. Trans. C. Pellat. 2d ed. Leiden, 1961.
