= Paul Albar =

Mozarab scholar, poet and theologian (800–861)

Paul Albar (Latin: Paulus Alvarus, Spanish: Paulo Álvaro or Álvaro de Córdoba; c. 800 – 861) was a Mozarab Andalusi scholar, poet and theologian of the Iberian Peninsula under Muslim rule. He is most notable for his writings around the time of a rising high civilization of Islam, owing to the Caliph's efforts. He also wrote the Vita Eulogii ('The Life of Eulogius'), a biography of his close friend and fellow theologian Eulogius of Córdoba. Although Christians living in Córdoba and the rest of Muslim Iberia during his time lived under relative religious freedom, Albar was amongst the Christians who perceived the many restrictions on the practice of their faith to be unacceptable persecution; they regarded with extreme scorn Christians who participated in the Muslim government, converted to Islam, or simply concealed their true beliefs. As a result of these religious tensions Albar's writings are characterized by contempt of all things Muslim and he considered Muhammed to have been the precursor to the Antichrist.

== Background ==
From the Umayyad conquest of Spain in 711 until the end of the Reconquista in 1492 the majority of the Iberian Peninsula came to be dominated by the Muslim state of Al-Andalus. During this period there were significant Christian and Jewish communities living under Muslim rule who were allowed to continue to practice their religion more or less freely. However, the so-called 'Martyrs of Córdoba' – about forty-eight Christians – were executed in Córdoba between 850 and 859 by Muslim authorities. Some of these Christians sought out martyrdom deliberately by verbally attacking Islam and Muhammed in areas of concentrated Muslim governance and religious worship, and consequently they were condemned for blasphemy. Others were accused of apostasy from Islam or of aiding Muslims who converted to Christianity. This sudden spike in religious tension resulted in increased persecutions of Christians, even moderate ones, which meant that the martyrs' actions were not always well received by more moderate Christians.

== Biography ==
As no biography of Albar exists, information about his life can only be found in letters written to and by him, as well as his own writings. According to one of his letters, he may have had Jewish background and been born into or converted to Christianity, or he might have been purely Christian; the uncertainty is due to his metaphorical use of the term "Jew" to possibly refer to God's chosen people rather than the ethnic/religious identity used today.

=== Education ===
Our more certain knowledge of Albar begins when he met his friend Eulogius for the first time while studying under Speraindeo, magister ('teacher') of young clerics. Albar and Eulogius developed a strong friendship which was to last until Eulogius's martyrdom, a friendship which developed into some sort of Platonic love. In his biography of Eulogius, Albar writes that Eulogius once said to him "let there be no other Albar but Eulogius, and may the whole love of Eulogius be settled nowhere but in Albar.'" The two students were perhaps overconfident in their learning and frequently debated issues of Christian doctrine that they did not understand well enough to have any meaningful contribution to make; later they destroyed the "volumes'" of their letters that resulted from these friendly but overzealous debates. They also each developed a love for poetry during this time which would be a secondary lifelong passion.

After his time as a student Albar appears not to have taken up any profession but rather remained a theologian for the rest of his life. He and Eulogius made it part of their lives' works to preserve Latin-Christian culture despite it becoming eroded by the ruling Muslim culture; in particular Albar saw the gradual replacement of Latin as the language of high culture and learning with Arabic as a problem he had to correct. One method of achieving this goal was to import Latin literature from the North into the South of Spain, such as Augustine's City of God which would not have been a rare volume under Christian rule.

Albar exchanged letters with a certain John of Seville, who sent him a summary of the Storia de Mahometh, a Latin biography of Muhammad.

=== Illness and the sacrament of penance ===
Sometime in the mid-850s Albar became seriously ill, the nature of which is unknown but it was severe enough for him to believe that he would not recover. Believing death to be close at hand he received the anointing of the sick, a common choice for those on their deathbeds; it was a sacrament that could only be performed once in one's lifetime, and the penitent would live the rest of his or her life according to a very strict set of rules. For most people, the onset of death alleviated this problem but for Albar it remained problematic because he recovered from his illness unexpectedly. As a result of being a living penitent he could not participate in communion until he had proved he could lead a virtuous life. His unfriendly relations with the clergy who performed the sacrament meant that he had to write to the in-hiding Bishop Saul of Córdoba to request that he be readmitted, which Saul refused. Albar's illness also caused him legal and property issues: Before and during his illness Albar had sold and repurchased some of his family's land which was granted to a monastery, and then immediately resold it to an unnamed official (seemingly under duress). The monastery later sued Albar when the official did not comply with the terms of its grant. Despite the fact that a man named Romanus, an important courtier, was exactly the sort of Christian that Albar deplored in his writings, he was forced to flatter Romanus for legal help in this case.

=== Persecutions of 850–859 ===
The extent to which Albar may have had a hand in guiding Christians to become martyrs is uncertain; however, he had very close ties to Eulogius who played a central role in motivating Christians not to actively provoke Muslim officials into arresting and executing them. On one occasion he and Eulogius met the soon-to-be-martyr Aurelius, to whom they certainly gave advice and encouragement. Unlike Eulogius, Albar did not choose to become a martyr and did not spend time in jail, which suggests that he chose not to publicly attack Islam in a setting where it might get him arrested for blasphemy. Instead, his main legacy from the persecutions is his documentation of them. Most true Christians generally did support the actions of the martyrs and were negatively impacted by the resulting persecutions. The martyrs therefore achieved the opposite of their goal; rather than rally the Christians against the Muslims, their deaths resulted in further distancing of moderate Christians from the radical cause. Albar's writings are consequently as much focused on convincing these moderates of his point of view – the sanctity of the martyrs – as they are a direct attack on Islam.

Albar, Eulogius, and earlier their mutual teacher Speraindeo were the first Iberian Christians who systematically and theologically attacked Islam in their writings. They also viewed the Christian community around them as divided by a distinct line. On one side were those who cooperated significantly with the Muslim officials and embraced Arabic culture and language, or at the least chose to conceal their Christian beliefs in public; on the other side lay Albar, Eulogius, and other devoted Christians including the martyrs who believed that no ground whatsoever could be given to the Muslims. If Christians and Muslims were to exist side-by-side, they believed, there should be no intermixing of their religion or culture, nor suppression of Christian expression. This was not only an ideological divide but also a physical divide, manifested in the temporary splitting of the church into two halves: one in support of the martyrs, and one against them.

== Main works ==
=== Writings against Islam ===
Jessica A. Coope observes in her book the Martyrs of Córdoba that Albar's writing, especially about Islam and Muhammed, "borders on hysterical'" but its execution was intelligent and calculated. In a short section of text Albar goes on to write:

Muslims are puffed up with pride, languid in the enjoyments of the fleshly acts, extravagant in eating, greedy usurpers in the acquisition of possessions... without honour, without truth, unfamiliar with kindness or compassion... fickle, crafty, cunning and indeed not halfway but completely befouled in the dregs of every impurity, deriding humility as insanity, rejecting chastity as though it were filthy, disparaging virginity as though it were the uncleanness of harlotry, putting the vices of the body before the virtues of the soul.

According to Coope, his goal was not to present an accurate picture of what Muslim society looked like but rather to use any means necessary to convince fellow Christians to hate Muslims and avoid associating with them. Albar's (and Eulogius's) self-appointed task was made easier by the fact their main target was Muslim court culture; the high degree of power and wealth that existed in the high court meant that it was simple and more believable to pick out material and physical obsessions, sinful in the Christian worldview, and exaggerate them.

=== Muhammed as the Praecursor Antichristi ===
Alvarus went to great lengths to prove that Muhammed was the praecursor antichristi, precursor to the antichrist, drawing on Gregory the Great's strategies of interpretation but using them with a specifically anti-Islamic goal. He first directly attacked Muhammed's character in the same manner as he did Muslims, depicting him as an immoral and sexually promiscuous figure; he called him a womanizer, the inspiration for all adulterous Muslim men, and considered Muhammed's paradise to be a supernatural brothel. Albar also attempted to justify identifying him as the antichrist by drawing on various sources from the New and Old Testaments. In Daniel, he used passages traditionally interpreted as referencing the antichrist but substituted Muhammed where necessary to make him the antagonist of the Christians: Daniel speaks of the eleventh horn resulting from the breakup of a 'fourth beast' (traditionally Rome), which Albar reinterpreted to mean that Muhammed the praecursor antichristi sprang from the breakup of Rome to crush the Christian kingdoms. Next, he connected the leviathan and the behemoth of Job 40 and 42, interpreted by Gregory as prefigurations of the antichrist, with Muhammed; he used these beasts as symbols for the Muslim-Christian antagonisms, especially in the surrounding context of the persecutions of the 850s.

== Other works ==
Alvarus also wrote the following works:

- Incipit Confessio Alvari – 'Confession of Alvarus' (P.L., CXXI, 397-412)
- Incipit Liber Epistolarum Alvari – a collection of letters (P.L., CXXI, 411-514)
- Indiculus Luminosus – moral treatise (P.L., CXXI, 513-556) - Meaning "The Little Letter of Lofty Eloquence." In this letter Álvaro complains that the talented Christian Mozarab youths of Islamic Spain could not even write a decent letter in Latin anymore, but they could do so in Classical Arabic better than the Arabs themselves.
- Incipiunt Versus – a collection of poems (P.L., CXXI, 555-566)
- Vita Vel Passio D. Eulogii – the life of Saint Eulogius of Córdoba (P.L., CXV, 705-724)
