= Saint Laura =

Spanish abbess and martyr

Saint Laura of Cordoba

Abbess and Martyr
- Born: 9th century Córdoba, Emirate of Córdoba
- Died: 864; Córdoba, Emirate of Córdoba
- Venerated in: Roman Catholic Church; Eastern Orthodox Church
- Feast: 19 October

Laura of Cordoba (Spanish: Santa Laura de Córdoba; died 864) was a Spanish Christian who lived in Muslim Spain during the 9th century. She was born in Córdoba, and became a nun at Cuteclara after her husband died. She eventually rose to become an abbess.

According to Saint Eulogius of Córdoba, she was martyred by Muslims, who took her captive and scalded her to death by placing her in a vat of boiling pitch. Her feast day is on 19 October; she is one of the Martyrs of Córdoba.

She is commemorated by the Estadio Santa Laura ("Saint Laura Stadium") in Santiago, Chile and the Humberstone and Santa Laura Saltpeter Works in northern Chile.

Thomas Love Peacock wrote a ballad about Saint Laura in his work Gryll Grange.
