= Aurea of Córdoba =

Christian nun and martyr

Saint Aurea of Córdoba

Martyr
- Born: 810; Córdoba, Spain
- Died: 856; Córdoba
- Canonized: Pre-congregation
- Feast: 19 July

Aurea of Córdoba (810–856) was a saint, nun, and martyr, part of the Martyrs of Córdoba, a group of 48 Christian martyrs executed during Muslim rule in al-Andalus. Aurea's feast day is 19 July.

== Life ==
Aurea was a widow who had been born into an Arab noble family; her father was a Muslim from Seville, and three members of her family were qadis, or Arab judges.

After her brothers John and Adulphus were executed for their apostasy from Islam in 825, Aurea went to live with her mother Artemia, who was also a nun, at the convent at Cuteclara for 30 years. She had also witnessed the deaths of three Christians who had been connected with her convent in the early 850s.

According to historian Kenneth B. Wolf, Aurea remained at Cuteclara without the knowledge of her relatives, but historians Jessica Coope and Reginald Haines stated that Aurea's relatives ignored her Christian faith, even though it was well known, for most of her adult life. Wolfe also stated that Aurea's Muslim relatives from Seville came to her convent, recognized her, and brought her before a judge to force her to recount her Christian faith. She was frightened into submission and released, but after "repenting of her compliance, and avowing herself truly a Christian", was arrested again and was executed in 856. Hagiographer Agnes Dunbar compared Aurea's regret and public confession during her second trial to St. Peter's denial of Christ in the Bible. Dunbar also stated that Aurea "was slain by a sword and hung on a giblet with her head down", although other sources state that she was beheaded. Her body was thrown into the Guadalquivir River and was never recovered.
