= Mozarabs =

Christians living under Muslim rule in Medieval Spain and Portugal

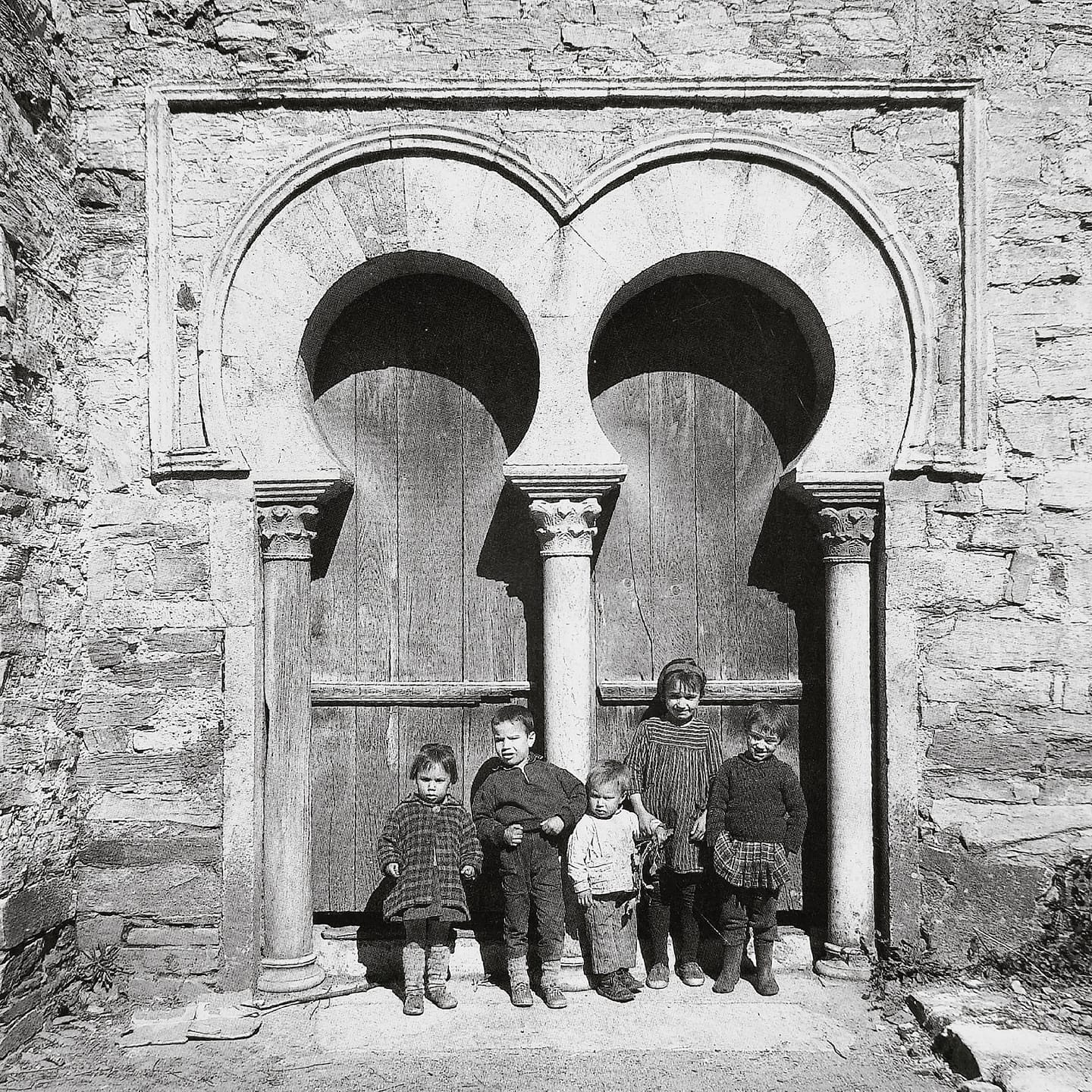
Mozarabic church of Santiago de Peñalba c. 1960

The Mozarabs (Note: /moʊˈzærəbz/ moh-ZARR-əbz; Spanish: mozárabes [moˈθaɾaβes]; Portuguese: moçárabes [muˈsaɾɐβɨʃ]; Catalan: mossàrabs [muˈsaɾəps].) (from Arabic: مُسْتَعْرَب, romanized: musta‘rab, lit. 'Arabized'), or more precisely Andalusi Christians, were the Christians of al-Andalus, or the territories of Iberia under Muslim rule from 711 to 1492. Following the Umayyad conquest of the Visigothic Kingdom in Hispania, the Christian population of much of Iberia came under Muslim control.

Initially, the vast majority of Mozarabs kept Christianity and their dialects descended from Latin. Gradually, the population converted to Islam—an estimated 50% by the year 951—and was influenced, in varying degrees, by Arab customs and knowledge, and sometimes acquired greater social status in doing so. The local Romance vernaculars, with an important contribution of Arabic and spoken by Christians and Muslims alike, are referred to as Andalusi Romance (also called Mozarabic language). Mozarabs were mostly Catholics of the Visigothic or Mozarabic Rite. Due to Sharia and fiqh being confessional and only applying to Muslims, the Christians paid the jizya tax, the only relevant Islamic law obligation, and kept Roman-derived, Visigothic-influenced civil law.

Most of the Mozarabs were descendants of local Christians and were primarily speakers of Romance varieties under Islamic rule. They also included those members of the former Visigothic ruling elite who did not convert to Islam or emigrate northwards after the Muslim conquest. Spanish Christians initially portrayed Muslims primarily as military or political enemies, but with time, Islam came to be seen as a religion and not merely a threat. Spanish Christians sought to discourage apostasy from Christianity and to defend Christian beliefs, but they increasingly became connected to the dar al-Islam (land of Islam), through shared culture, language, and regular interaction.

A few were Arab and Berber Christians coupled with Muslim converts to Christianity who, as Arabic speakers, felt at home among the original Mozarabs. A prominent example of a Muslim who became a Mozarab by embracing Christianity is the Andalusi rebel and anti-Umayyad military leader Umar ibn Hafsun. The Mozarabs of Muslim origin were descendants of those Muslims who converted to Christianity following the conquest of Toledo, and perhaps also following the expeditions of King Alfonso I of Aragon. These Mozarabs of Muslim origin who converted en masse at the end of the 11th century, many of them Muladí (ethnic Iberians previously converted to Islam), are distinct from the Mudéjars and Moriscos who converted gradually to Christianity between the 12th and 17th centuries.

Separate Mozarab enclaves were located in the large Muslim cities, especially Toledo, Córdoba, Zaragoza, and Seville.

== Name ==
Mozarab (Spanish: mozárabes [moˈθaɾaβes]; Portuguese: moçárabes [muˈsaɾɐβɨʃ]; Catalan: mossàrabs [muˈsaɾəps]; from Arabic: مُسْتَعْرَب, romanized: musta‘rab, lit. 'Arabized') is first documented in Christian sources from the 11th century; the term Mozarab was not used by Muslims to describe Christians. Contemporary Arabic sources described Christians as naṣārā (نصارى 'Nazarenes'), or imprecisely by their legal-religious status: ahl adh-dhimma (أهل الذمة 'people of the covenant') or mu‘āhidūn (معاهدون 'contractual partners').

The term Mozarab, now sometimes applied broadly to all Christians in al-Andalus, is imprecise; many Christians living in Islamic Spain resisted Arabization, for example.

== Status ==
Christians and Jews were designated as dhimmi under Sharia (Islamic law). Dhimmi were allowed to live within Muslim society, but were legally required to pay the jizya, a personal tax, and abide with a number of religious, social, and economic restrictions that came with their status. Despite their restrictions, the dhimmi were fully protected by the Muslim rulers and did not have to fight in case of war, because they paid the jizya.

As the universal nature of Roman law was eroded and replaced by Islamic law in part of the Iberian Peninsula, Sharia law allowed most ethnic groups in the medieval Islamic world to be judged by their own judges, under their own law: Mozarabs had their own tribunals and authorities. Some of them even held high offices in the Islamic administration under some rulers— a prominent example being that of Recemundus, a palace official, who, sometime between 961 and 976, wrote the famous Calendar of Córdoba for Abd ar-Rahman III, undertook various diplomatic missions in Germania and Byzantium, and was rewarded with the bishopric of Elvira (present-day Granada). Furthermore, in 1064, Emir Al-Muqtadir of Zaragoza sent Paternus, the Mozarabic bishop of Tortosa, as an envoy to king Ferdinand I of León in Santiago de Compostela, while the Christian Abu Umar ibn Gundisalvus, a Saqaliba (a Slav), served the same taifa ruler as the Wazir (Vizier, or the equivalent to prime minister).

Conversion to Islam was encouraged by the Umayyad caliphs and emirs of Córdoba. Many Mozarabs converted to Islam to avoid the heavy jizyah tax which they were subjected to as dhimmi. Conversion to Islam also opened up new horizons to the Mozarabs, alleviated their social position, ensured better living conditions, and broadened scope for more technically skilled and advanced work. Apostasy, however, for one who had been raised as a Muslim or had embraced Islam, was a crime punishable by death.

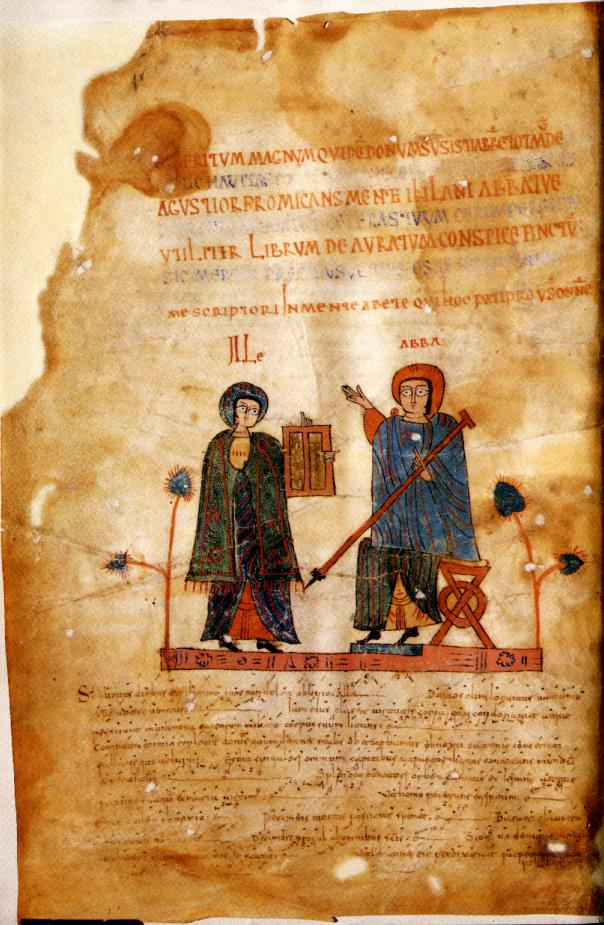
León Antiphonary Folio (11th-century), León Cathedral

Until the mid-9th century, relations between Muslims and the majority Christian population of Al-Andalus, were relatively cordial. Christian resistance to the first wave of Muslim conquerors was unsuccessful. In Murcia, a single surviving capitulation document must stand for many such agreements to render tribute in exchange for the protection of traditional liberties; in it, Theodomirus (Todmir in Arabic), Visigothic count of Orihuela, agrees to recognize Abd al-Aziz as overlord and to pay tribute consisting of a yearly cash payment supplemented with specific agricultural products. In exchange, Theodomir received Abd al-Aziz' promise to respect both his property and his jurisdiction in the province of Murcia. There was no change in the composition of the people on the land, and in cases like this one, even their Visigothic lords remained.

In the Moorish controlled region of Al-Garb Al-Andalus to the west of Al-Andalus, which included the modern region of Algarve and most of Portugal, Mozarabs constituted the majority of the population.

The Muslim geographer Ibn Hawqal, who visited the country in the middle of the 10th century, spoke of frequent revolts by Mozarab peasants employed on large estates, probably those of the ruling aristocracy. There is also substantial evidence that Mozarabs fought in the defense of the thaghr (front line fortress towns), participating in raids against Christian neighbours and struggles between Muslim factions. For instance, in 936, a significant number of Christians holed up in Calatayud with the rebel Mutarraf, only to be massacred in a desperate stand against the Caliphate forces.

There is very little evidence of any Christian resistance at Al-Andalus in the 9th century. Evidence points to a rapid attrition in the North. For instance, during the 1st centuries of Muslim rule, the Mozarab community of Lleida was apparently ruled by a qumis (count) and had its own judiciary, but there is no evidence of any such administration in the later period.

Although Mozarab merchants traded in Andalusi markets, they were neither influential nor numerous before the middle of the 12th century. This stemmed from commercial disinterest and disorganization in the early Middle Ages, rather than any specific or religious impediments set up by the Muslim rulers. Unlike Andalusi Muslims and Jews, Mozarabs had little interest in commerce because of their general perception of trade as lowly and despicable. This was in stark contrast to the greater respect accorded to merchants in Jewish and Muslim societies, where trade was frequently combined with other callings, such as politics, scholarship, or medicine.

It is often mistakenly assumed that Mozarab merchants forged a vital commercial and cultural link between the north and south across the Iberian frontiers. Mozarab refugees may have had influence in northern Iberian trade at places like Toledo, but there is no reason to believe that they engaged in commerce with their abandoned homeland. Most traffic between Al-Andalus and Christian regions remained in the hands of Jewish and Muslim traders until the dramatic shifts initiated by European commercial expansion throughout the 11th and 12th centuries. With the development of Italian maritime power and the southward expansion of the Christian Reconquista, Andalusi international trade came increasingly under the control of Christian traders from northern Iberia, southern France, and Italy. By the middle of the 13th century, it was an exclusively Christian concern.

There were frequent contacts between the Mozarabs in Al-Andalus and their co-religionists both in the Kingdom of Asturias and in the Marca Hispanica, the territory under Frankish influence to the northeast. The level of literary culture among the northern Christians was inferior to that of their Mozarab brethren in the historic cities to the south, due to the prosperity of Al-Andalus. For that reason, Christian refugees from Al-Andalus were always welcomed in the north, where their descendants came to form an influential element. Though impossible to quantify, the emigration of Mozarabs from the south was probably a significant factor in the growth of the Christian principalities and kingdoms of northern Iberia.

For most of the 9th and 10th centuries, Iberian Christian culture in the north was stimulated by the learning of Mozarab immigrants, who helped to accentuate its Christian identity and apparently played a major role in development of Iberian Christian ideology. The Mozarab scholars and clergy eagerly sought manuscripts, relics and traditions from the towns and monasteries of central and southern Iberia that had been the heartland of Visigothic Catholicism. Many Mozarabs also took part in the many regional revolts that formed the great fitna or unrest in the late 9th century.

The Caliphate of Cordoba

The ability of the Mozarabs to assimilate into Moorish culture while maintaining their Christian faith has often caused them to be depicted by Western scholars as having a strong allegiance to Catholicism and its cause. However, the historian Jaume Vicens Vives offers another view of the Mozarabs. He states that one of the Emperor Charlemagne's major offensives was to annihilate the Moorish frontier by taking Zaragoza, which was an important Mozarab stronghold. However, the offensive failed because the Mozarabs of the city refused to cooperate with the Catholic emperor. Vives concludes that the Mozarabs were primarily a self-absorbed group. They understood that they could gain a great deal by remaining in close contact with the Moors.

There was a steady rate of decline among the Mozarab population of Al-Andalus towards the end of the Reconquista. This was mainly caused by conversions, emigration towards the northern part of the peninsula during the upheavals of the 9th and early 10th centuries and also by the ethno-religious conflicts of the same period.

The American historian, Richard Bulliet, in a work based on the quantitative use of the onomastic data as furnished by scholarly biographical dictionaries, concluded that it was only in the 10th century when the Andalusi emirate was firmly established and developed into the greatest power of the western Mediterranean under Caliph Abd ar-Rahman III, that the numerical ratio of Muslims and Christians in Al-Andalus was reversed in favour of the former. Prior to the middle of this century, he asserts, the population of Al-Andalus was still half Christian.

The expansion of the Caliphate had come primarily through conversion and absorption, and only very secondarily through immigration. The remaining Mozarab community shrank into an increasingly fossilized remnant.

Relatively large numbers of Mozarab communities did, however, continue to exist up to the end of the taifa kingdoms; there were several parishes in Toledo when the Christians occupied the city in 1085, and abundant documentation in Arabic on the Mozarabs of this city is preserved. An apparently still significant Mozarab group, which is the subject of a number of passages in the Arabic chronicles dealing with El Cid's dominion over Valencia, was also to be found there during this same period. Similarly, the memoirs of the emir of Granada clearly indicate the existence of a relatively large rural Christian population in some parts of the Málaga region towards the end of the 11th century. Until the reconquest of Seville by the Christians in 1248, a Mozarab community existed there, though in the course of the 12th century Almoravid persecution had forced many Mozarabs in Al-Andalus to flee northward.

== Restrictions ==
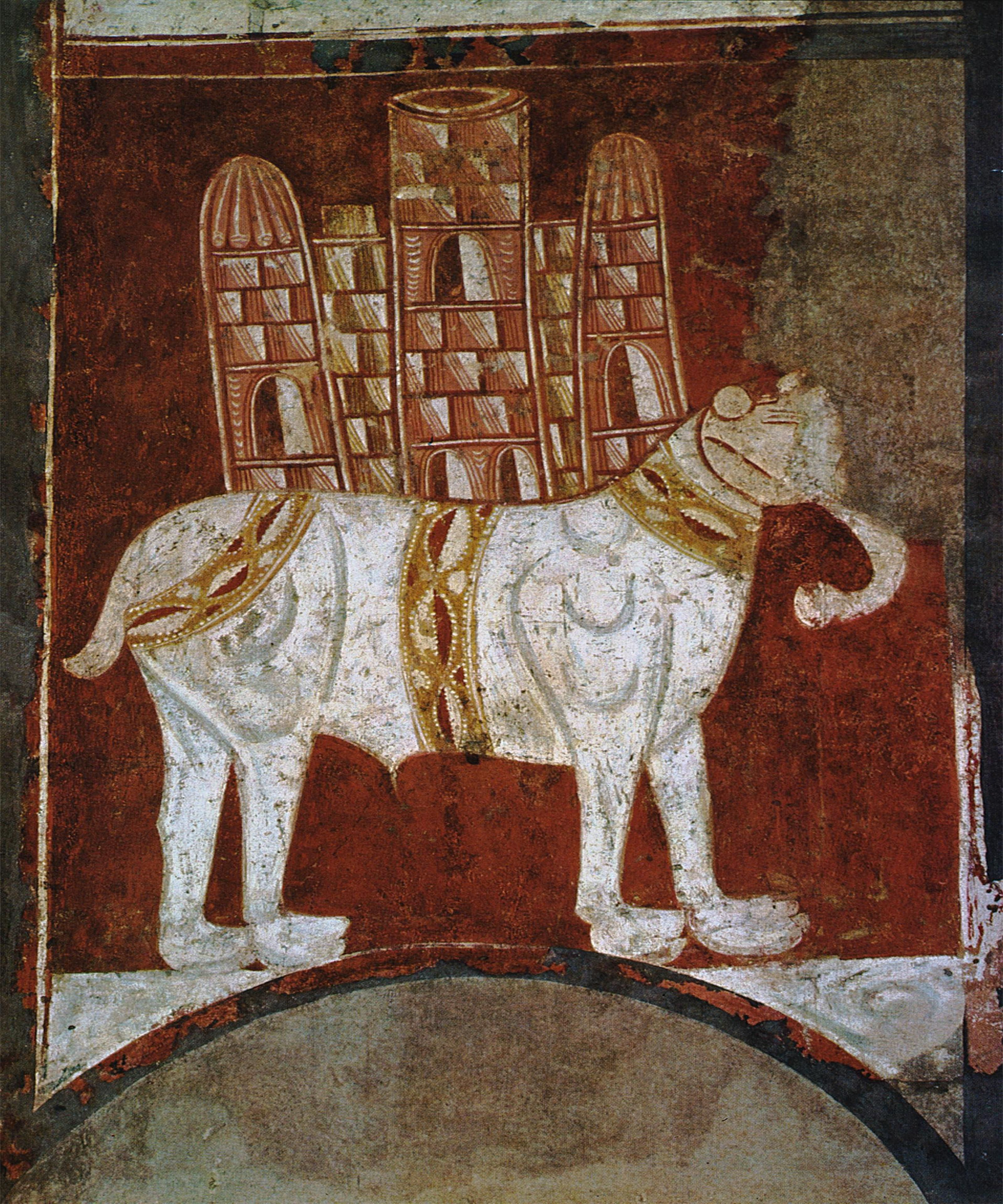
Mozarab mural painting from San Baudelio de Berlanga, now in the Prado Museum

Christians did not enjoy equal rights under Islamic rule, and their original guarantees, at first fairly broad, steadily diminished. They were still allowed to practice their own religion in private, but found their cultural autonomy increasingly reduced. Mozarabs inevitably lost more and more status, but they long maintained their dignity and the integrity of their culture, and they never lost personal and cultural contact with the Christian world.

In the generations that followed the conquest, Muslim rulers promulgated new statutes clearly disadvantageous to dhimmi. The construction of new churches and the sounding of church bells were eventually forbidden. But when Eulogius of Córdoba recorded the martyrology of the Martyrs of Córdoba during the decade after 850, it was apparent that at least four Christian basilicas remained in the city, including the church of Saint Acisclus that had sheltered the only holdouts in 711, and nine monasteries and convents in the city and its environs; nevertheless, their existence soon became precarious.

It is supposed that the Mozarabs were tolerated as dhimmi and valued taxpayers, and no Mozarab was condemned to death until the formation of the party led by the Christian leaders Eulogius (beheaded in 859) and Alvaro of Córdoba, whose intense faith led them to seek martyrdom by insulting Muhammad, and criticizing Islam. The Arabization of the Christians was opposed by Eulogius himself, who called for a more purely Christian culture stripped of Moorish influences. To this end, he led a revolt of the Mozarabs at Córdoba in which Christians martyred themselves to protest against Muslim rule.

However, Kenneth Baxter Wolf concludes that Eulogius was not the instigator of these persecutions but merely a hagiographer. This is consistent with other historical records of two Christians executed in 860, and shortly after a third one. The subsequent executions were in 888–912 and 913–920. Still more executions were recorded in Córdoba: Eugenia in 923; a boy, Pelagius, in 926 (for refusal to convert to Islam and submit to the caliph's sexual advances); and Argentea in 931. According to Wolf, there is no reason to believe that they stopped even then.

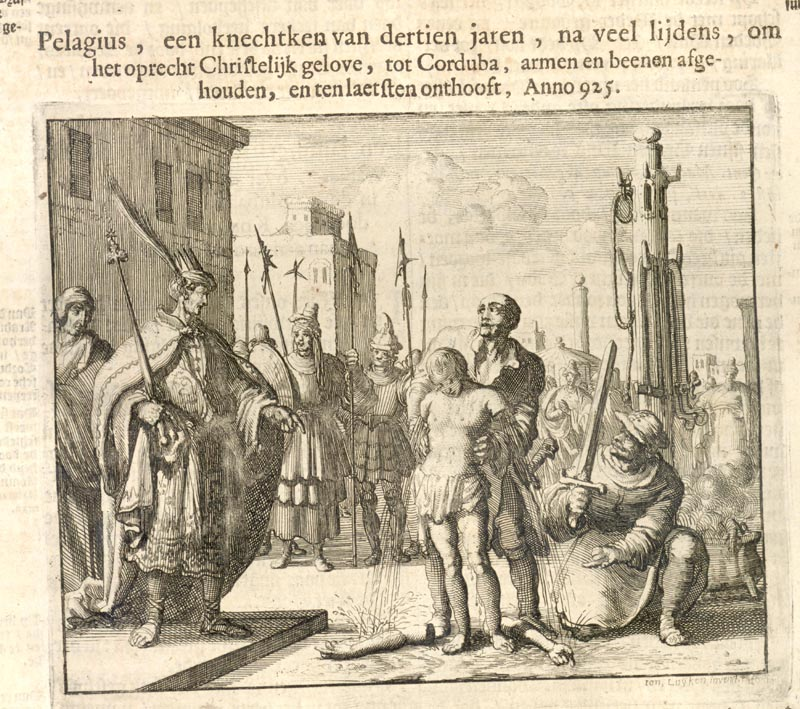
Pelagius is depicted in the 1660 Martyrs Mirror.

Eulogius's writings documenting stories of the Córdoba martyrs of 851–59, encouraged by him to defy Muslim authorities with blasphemies and embrace martyrdom, contrast these Christians with the earlier official Christianity of the Visigoths, by Reccared, the previous bishop of Córdoba, who counseled tolerance and mutual forbearance with the Muslim authorities. However, since then Christians became increasingly alienated not only because they could not build new churches or ring church bells, but primarily because they were excluded from most positions of political, military, or social authority and suffered many other indignities as unequals under the Islamic law. By the mid-9th century, as the episode of the Córdoba martyrs reveals, there was a clear Christian opposition against the systematic pressure by a variety of legal and financial instruments of Islam, resisting their conversion and absorption into Muslim culture.

The initial official reaction to the Córdoba martyrs was to round up and imprison the leaders of the Christian community. Towards the end of the decade of the martyrs, Eulogius's martyrology begins to record the closing of Christian monasteries and convents.

As previously with the Muslims, so as the Reconquista advanced, the Mozarabs integrated into the Christian kingdoms, where the kings privileged those who settled the frontier lands. They also migrated north to the Frankish kingdom in times of persecution.

Significantly large numbers of Mozarabs settled in the Ebro valley. King Alfonso VI of Castile induced Mozarab settlers by promising them lands and rewards. His importation of Mozarab settlers from Al-Andalus was very unusual because of its startling nature. According to the Anglo-Norman historian, Orderic Vitalis, some 10,000 Mozarabs were sent by Alfonso for settlement on the Ebro. Mozarabs were scarce in Tudela or Zaragossa, but were more common in a place such as Calahorra, conquered by the Kingdom of Navarre in 1045.

== Language ==
During the early stages of Romance language development in Iberia, a set of closely related Romance dialects was spoken in Muslim areas of the Peninsula by the general population. These closely related historic dialects are today known as the Mozarabic language, though there never was a common standard.

This archaic Romance language is first documented in writing in the Peninsula in the form of choruses (kharjas) in Arabic and Hebrew lyrics called muwashshahs. As they were written in Arabic and Hebrew alphabet the vowels have had to be reconstructed.

Mozarab had a significant impact in the formation of Portuguese, Spanish and Catalan, transmitting to these many words of Andalusi Arabic origin. The northward migration of Mozarabs explains the presence of Arabic toponyms in places where the Muslim presence did not last long.

The cultural language of Mozarabs continued to be Latin, but as time passed, young Mozarabs studied and even excelled at Arabic. The implantation of Arabic as the vernacular by the Moorish conquerors led the Christian polemicist Petrus Alvarus of Córdoba to famously lament the decline of spoken Latin among the local Christians.

=== Names ===
The use of Arabic cognomens by the Mozarab communities of Al-Andalus is emblematic of the adoption by the Christians of the outward manifestations of Arab-language Islamic culture. The Mozarabs employed Arabic-style names such as Zaheid ibn Zafar, Pesencano ibn Azafar, Ibn Gafif, Ibn Gharsiya (Garcia), Ibn Mardanish (Martinez), Ibn Faranda (Fernandez), in purely Christian contexts. This demonstrates that they had acculturated thoroughly and that their Arabic names were not mere aliases adopted to facilitate their movement within Muslim society. Conversely, some Christian names such as Lope and Fortun entered the local Arabic lexicon (Lubb and Fortun), and others were adopted in translated form (such as Sa'ad for Felix). In the witness lists, Mozarabs identified themselves with undeniably Arabic names such as al-Aziz, and Ibn Uthman. Several Mozarabs also used the name Al-Quti (The Goth), and some may have been actual descendants from the family of the Pre-Islamic Visigothic Christian king, Wittiza.

== Culture and religion ==
There are but few remains of Christian scholarly discourse in Muslim Iberia. What remains in Arabic are translations of the Gospels and the Psalms, anti-Islamic tracts and a translation of a church history. To this should be added literary remains in Latin which remained the language of the liturgy.

There is evidence of a limited cultural borrowing from the Mozarabs by the Muslim community in Al-Andalus. For instance, the Muslims' adoption of the Christian solar calendar and holidays was an exclusively Andalusi phenomenon. In Al-Andalus, the Islamic lunar calendar was supplemented by the local solar calendar, which were more useful for agricultural and navigational purposes. Like the local Mozarabs, the Muslims of Al-Andalus were notoriously heavy drinkers. Muslims also celebrated traditional Christian holidays sometimes with the sponsorship of their leaders, despite the fact that such fraternisation was generally opposed by the Ulema. The Muslims also hedged their metaphysical bets through the use of Roman Catholic sacraments.

In the earliest period of Muslim domination of Iberia, there is evidence of extensive interaction between the two communities attested to by shared cemeteries and churches, bilingual coinage, and the continuity of late Roman pottery types. Furthermore, in the peninsula the conquerors did not settle in the amsar, the self-contained and deliberately isolated city camps set up alongside existing settlements elsewhere in the Muslim world with the intention of protecting Muslim settlers from corrupting indigenous influences.

The Arab and mostly Berber immigrants who settled in the existing towns were drawn into broad contact with natives. Their immigration, though limited in numbers, introduced new agricultural and hydraulic technologies, new craft industries, and Levantine techniques of shipbuilding. They were accompanied by an Arabic-language culture that brought with it the higher learning and science of the classical and post-classical Levantine world. The emir of Córdoba, Abd ar-Rahman I's policy of allowing the ethnic Arab politico-military elite to practice agriculture further encouraged economic and cultural contact and cohesion. Moreover, the interaction of foreign and native elements, fostered by intermarriage and contact in day-to-day commercial and social life rapidly stimulated acculturation between the two groups.

The heterodox features of Mozarabic culture inevitably became more prominent. However, Christian women often married Muslim men and their children were raised as Muslims. Even within Mozarab families, legal divorce eventually came to be practised along Islamic lines. Some Mozarab men were even circumcised. Ordination of the clergy ultimately drifted far from canonical norms, breaking apostolic succession, and various Muslim sources claim that concubinage and fornication among the clergy was extremely widespread.

Some Christian authorities (Álvaro and Eulogius of Córdoba) were scandalized at the treatment of Christians, and began encouraging the public declarations of the faith as a way to reinforce the faith of the Christian community and protest the Islamic laws that Christians saw as unjust. Eulogius composed tractates and martyrologies for Christians during this time.

The forty-eight Christians (mostly monks) known as the Martyrs of Córdoba were martyred between the years 850 and 859, being decapitated for publicly proclaiming their Christian beliefs. Dhimmi (non-Muslims living under Muslim rule) were not allowed to speak of their faith to Muslims under penalty of death.

Wolf points out that it is important to distinguish between the motivations of the individual martyrs, and those of Eulogius and Alvarus in writing the Memoriale. Jessica A. Coope says that while it would be wrong to ascribe a single motive to all forty-eight, she suggests that it reflects a protest against the process of assimilation. They demonstrated a determination to assert Christian identity.

The Mozarab population was badly affected by the hardening of relations between the Christians and the Muslims during the Almoravid period. In 1099, the people of Granada, by order of the Almoravid emir, Yusuf ibn Tashfin, acting on the advice of his Ulema, destroyed the main Mozarab church of the Christian community.

The Mozarabs remained apart from the influence of French Catholic religious orders, such as the Cistercians – highly influential in northern Christian Iberia, and conserved in their masses the Visigothic rite, also known as the Mozarabic Rite. The Christian kingdoms of the north, though, changed to the Latin liturgical rites and appointed northerners as bishops for the reconquered sees. Nowadays, the Mozarabic Rite is allowed by a papal privilege at the Mozarab Chapel of the Cathedral of Toledo, where it is held daily. The Poor Clare church in Madrid, La Inmaculada y San Pascual, also holds weekly Mozarabic masses. A Mozarab brotherhood is still active in Toledo. Since Toledo was the most deeply rooted centre where they remained firm, the Gothic rite was identified and came to be known as the "Toledan rite".

In 1080, Pope Gregory VII called the council of Burgos, where it was agreed to unify the Latin liturgical rite in all Christian lands. In 1085, Toledo was reconquered and there was a subsequent attempt to reintroduce the ecumenical standards of Rome. The reaction of the Toledan people was such that the king refused to implement it, and in 1101 enacted the "Fuero (Code of laws) of the Mozarabs", which awarded them privileges. He specified that it applied only to the Castilians, Mozarabs, and Franks of the city.

During both his first marriage to Agnes of Aquitaine and his second marriage to Constance of Burgundy, both of whom were devout Catholics, King Alfonso VI of Castile was under constant pressure to eradicate the Mozarabic Rite. A popular legend states that Alfonso VI submitted the Mozarab liturgy and its Roman counterpart to ordeal by fire, putting the fix in for the Catholic rite. Hence, the Mozarab liturgy was abolished in 1086. The Mozarabic Chapel in the Cathedral of Toledo still uses the Mozarabic Rite and music.

In 1126, a great number of Mozarabs were expelled to North Africa by the Almoravids. Other Mozarabs fled to Northern Iberia. This constituted the end of the Mozarabic culture in Al-Andalus. For a while, both in North Africa and in Northern Iberia, the Mozarabs managed to maintain their own separate cultural identity for generations. Many of the North Africans returned to their recently freed former homelands as the Reconquista unfolded.

Over the course of the 12th and 13th centuries, there unrolled a steady process of the impoverishment of Mozarab cultivators, as more and more land came under control of magnates and ecclesiastical corporations. The latter, under the influence of the Benedictine bishop of Cluny Bernard, and the Archbishop of Toledo Rodrigo Jiménez de Rada, who was himself the principal buyer of Mozarab property in the early 13th century fomented a segregationalist policy under the cloak of religious nationalism. Jiménez de Rada's bias is symbolized in his coining of the semi-erudite etymology of the word Mozarab from Mixti Arabi, connoting the contamination of this group by overexposure to infidel customs, if not by migration.

At Toledo, King Alfonso VI of Castile did not recognize the Mozarabs as a separate legal community, and thus accentuated a steady decline which led to the complete absorption of the Mozarabs by the general community by the end of the 15th century. As a result, the Mozarabic culture had been practically lost. Cardinal Francisco Jiménez de Cisneros, aware of the Mozarabic liturgy historical value and liturgical richness, undertook the task of guaranteeing its continuation, and to this end gathered all the codices and texts to be found in the city. After they had been carefully studied by specialists, they were classified and in 1502 the Missal and Breviary were printed. They revitalized the faith and a chapel was instituted at the cathedral, with its own priests which still exists today.

The Mozarab Missal of Silos is the oldest Western manuscript on paper, written in the 11th century. The Mozarab community in Toledo continues to thrive to this day. It is made of 1,300 families whose genealogies can be traced back to the ancient Mozarabs.

== Debates on population ==
There is a long-running debate about how many of the population of Al-Andalus were Mozarabs. Some maintain that the Mozarabs were part of a historical continuum of Latinized Christians that represented the majority of the population of Al-Andalus, while others argue that the Christian population was relatively small in the areas under Muslim rule. The former camp bases their position on the work of Francisco Javier Simonet, whose works Glosario de voces ibéricas y latinas usadas entre los mozárabes (1888) and Historia de los mozárabes de España supported the idea that the indigenous Christian community of Al-Andalus formed the majority of the population. Other historians argue that the work of Simonet and those who preceded him in studying this question did not use sources properly, and that there is no historical evidence that can be used to make a definitive pronouncement on the ethnic composition of Al-Andalus society. According to scholar Josephine Labanyi, at the end of the 11th century there were about 75,000 Christians in the Emirate of Granada or roughly 15% of the population of Islamic Iberia.

== Literature ==
The literature of the Mozarabs is bilingual in Latin and Arabic. Mozarabs were originally those Christians living under Islamic rule following their own Mozarabic rite. Many continued to live under Christian rule while keeping their distinctive rite down to the 14th century. The switch from a predominantly Latinate culture to an Arabic one was already well underway in the mid-9th century. The use of Arabic by Mozarabs rapidly declined in the late 13th century.

Among the Latin works of early Mozarabic culture, historiography is especially important, since it constitutes the earliest record from al-Andalus of the conquest period. There are two main works, the Chronicle of 741 and the Chronicle of 754.

At the height of the Córdoban martyrs' movement (850–859), Albarus of Córdoba wrote a treatise in Latin, Indiculus luminosus, defending the martyrs and decrying the movement towards Arabic among his fellow Mozarabs. A generation later, Ḥafṣ ibn Albar al-Qūtī, finished a rhymed verse translation of the Psalms from the Latin Vulgate in 889. Although it survives in only one manuscript, it was a popular text and is quoted by Muslim and Jewish authors. Ḥafṣ also wrote a book of Christian answers to Muslim questions about their faith called The Book of the Fifty-Seven Questions. It is lost, but there are excerpts in the work of al-Qurṭubī, who praises Ḥafṣ' command of Arabic as the best among the Mozarabs. The 11th-century writer Ibn Gabirol also quotes from a lost work of Ḥafṣ al-Qūtī.

== See also ==
- Musta'arabi Jews
- Muwallad
- Mozarabic art and architecture
