= Nunilo and Alodia =

Child martyrs

Saints Nunilo and Alodia
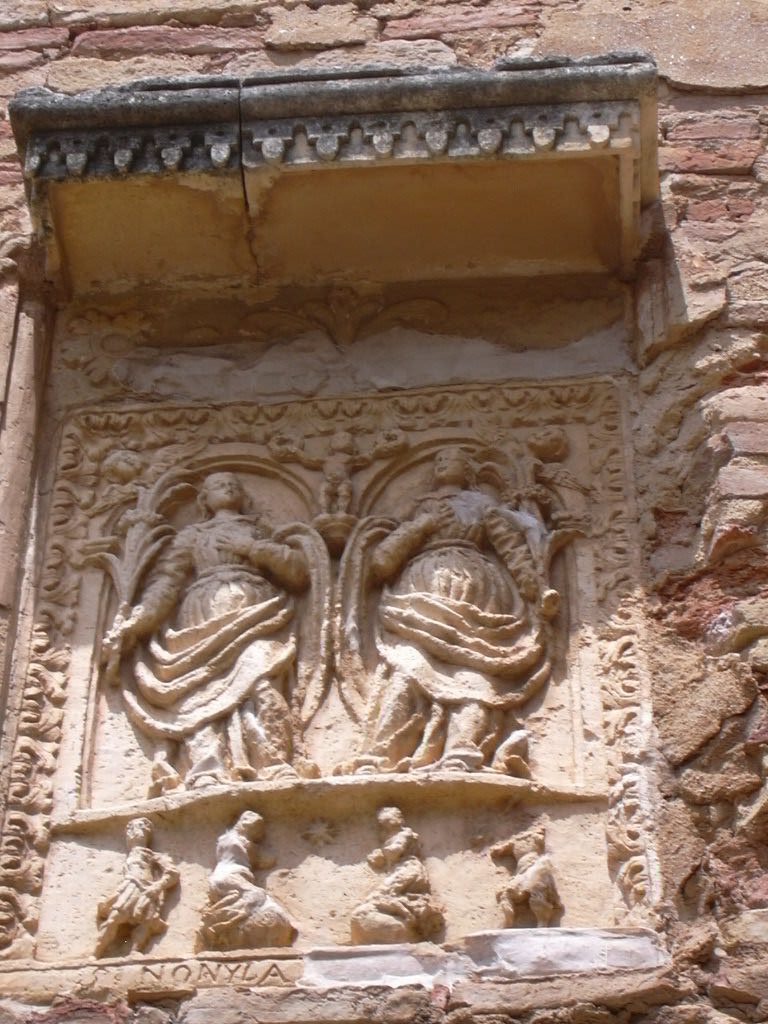
- Carving of Nunilo and Alodia on the collegiate church of Alquézar. The base of the carving reads "Nonyla", but her sister's name has been broken off

Virgins and martyrs
- Born: Huesca, Spain
- Died: October 22, 851
- Feast: October 22

Nunilo and Alodia (also called Nunilone and Alódia; died c. 851) were a pair of child martyrs from Huesca in north-eastern Spain. They appear in the Roman Martyrology and in the calendars of the Mozarabic rite. Their martyrdom is described by Eulogius of Córdoba in 851 in his account of the Cordoban martyrs in the Memoriale Sanctorum, even though they were from Huesca because of their addition to the Roman Martyrology. Eulogius describes in the Sanctorum how religiously mixed families functioned during the early Islamic period. According to art historian Julie Harris, the sisters "received more detailed treatment" in the Passional of Cardeña, during the eleventh century. Scholar Christian C. Sahner calls the sisters' story "dubious," but states that "the general circumstances of their lives are consistent with what we know about the internal dynamics of mixed families".

Nunilo and Alodia were sisters born into "a rich family"; art historian Julie Harris called them, like many martyrs of the same period, "the product of a mixed marriage". Their mother was Christian and their father was Muslim, but he allowed them to be raised in their mother's faith. When their father died, their mother remarried another "prominent" Muslim man, "who was not as tolerant" and was "an adherent of an obstinate conquering paganism", so in defiance of his prohibition that they attend church and demand that they marry and convert to Islam, they were sent to live with their aunt, who was also Christian, in Castile.

In 851, Abd ar-Rahman II issued a decree that all Christian children to a Muslim father had to convert to their father's religion or be executed. After repeated failed attempts to get Nunilo and Alodia to agree to convert, they were arrested, put in solitary confinement, then "handed over to women of dubious morality to make them change their lifestyle", and "were also pestered by many suitors to marry". The sisters still refused, so they were beheaded in Huesca, Spain, on October 22, 851. Their feast day is October 22.

The exact date of their martyrdom is uncertain. Eulogius asserts that they were martyred in 851, a date that has been generally adopted. However, scholars have long questioned Eulogius' recorded chronology. Art historian Ann Rosemary Christys has proposed that the sisters may have been killed earlier in the ninth century, possibly around 813, although the evidence remains inconclusive.

The relics of Nunilo and Alodia were translated to the Monastery of Leyre in Navarre during the ninth century, though the exact date remains unclear. The Acta Sanctorum gives the year 880 for the translation, but this may reflect a misreading of the Hispanic era as Anno Domini (AD), which would instead correspond to 842 and places the sisters’ martyrdom around 813.

The Leyre Casket, an ivory casket produced in 1005 in the Caliphate of Córdoba (756–1031), was later brought to the Monastery of Leyre, though the circumstances of its transfer remain undocumented; there, it was repurposed as a reliquary to contain the relics of Nunilo and Alodia. According to art historian Julie Harris, this conversion may have coincided with the consecration of the monastery's crypt in 1057. When the monastery was suppressed in 1836, Nunilo and Alodia's relics were moved to San Ginés Church in Arrecife.

== Works cited ==
- Sahner, Christian C. (2018). Christian Martyrs under Islam: Religious Violence and the Making of the Muslim World. Princeton, New Jersey: Princeton University Press. ISBN 9780691179100.
