= Theophylact of Nicomedia =

Bishop of Nicomedia

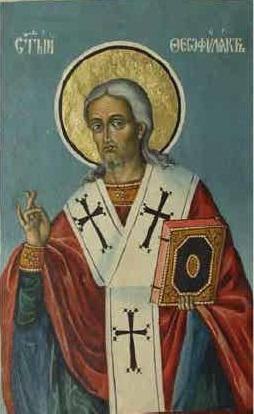
Fresco of Theophylact of Nicomedia in Archangels Chapel in the Rila Monastery, Bulgaria, 1835.

Theophylact or Theophylaktos (d. 845 AD) became bishop of Nicomedia in Asia Minor during the Iconoclastic Controversy of the eighth century.

== Life ==
Theophylactus was from Constantinople. He had an excellent education, and gained a reputation for wisdom. After several years in the monastery, he was made Bishop of Nicomedia. He was well known for having built churches, hospices, and homes for wanderers. He generously distributed alms, was the guardian of orphans, widows and the sick, and personally attended those afflicted with leprosy, not hesitating to wash their wounds.

During the iconoclast reign of Leo the Armenian (813-820 AD), Theophylaktos argued vigorously for the use of art in the Church. The emperor sent him into exile.

He is recognized as a Saint in the Eastern Orthodox Church for his tireless defense of the faith, for miraculous deeds attributed to him, and for his Christian spirit.

His life is commemorated on March 8.
