= Acisclus =

Christian martyr (d. 304)

Saint Acisclus
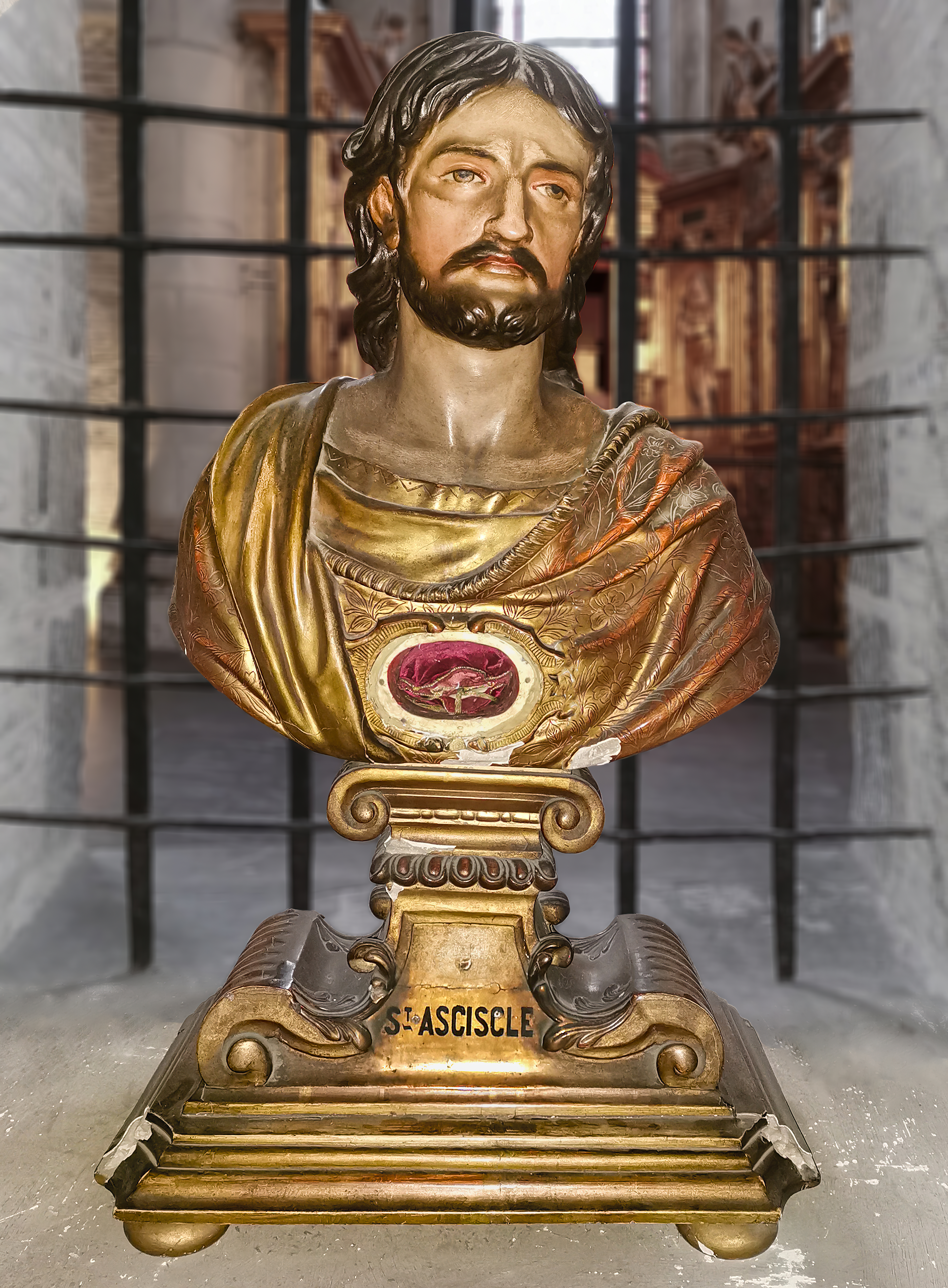
- Reliquary of Acisclus, Saint-Sernin basilica crypt

Martyr
- Born: 3rd century Córdoba, Hispania Baetica, Roman Empire
- Died: 304; Córdoba, Hispania Baetica, Roman Empire
- Venerated in: Catholic Church, Eastern Orthodox Church
- Feast: 17 November
- Attributes: with Saint Victoria, his sister, crowned with roses
- Patronage: Córdoba, Spain

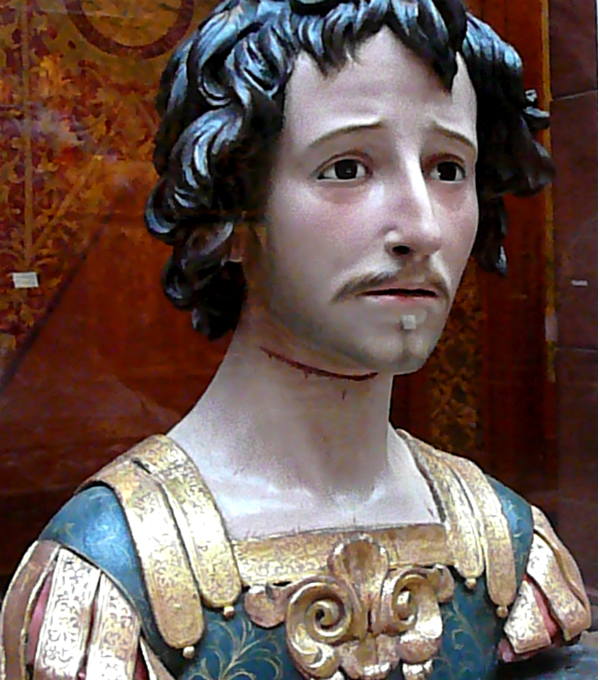
The red slit in the neck in this bust of St. Acisclus at the Hispanic Society refers to his decapitation at the order of the Roman governor of Cordoba. The often juvenile representation of the saint may refer to the governor's taunt, "think about the beauty of your youth, lest you perish."

Saint Acisclus (also Ascylus, Ocysellus; Spanish: Acisclo; French: Aciscle) (died 304) was a martyr of Córdoba, in Hispania Baetica. His life is mentioned by Eulogius of Cordoba. He suffered martyrdom during the Diocletianic Persecution along with his sister Victoria. Their feast day is 17 November. There is doubt about the historical veracity of Victoria's existence, but both martyrs were honored in the Mozarabic liturgy.

After they were arrested, Acisclus and Victoria were tortured. According to tradition, Victoria was killed by arrows and Acisclus was beheaded.

One tenth century passio relates that the Roman prefect of Córdoba, Dion, an "iniquitous persecutor of Christians," had Acisclus and Victoria cast into a fiery furnace. However, when he heard Acisclus and Victoria sing songs of joy from within the furnace, Dion had them bound to stones and cast into the Guadalquivir. They were soon floating unharmed on the river's surface. He then suspended them over a fire. The fire, however, raged out of control and killed hundreds of pagans. The two saints then submitted to martyrdom, having proved their point and demonstrated their faith.

Their home was turned into a church. During the ninth century, some of the Martyrs of Córdoba were associated with this church, including Perfectus, a priest there.

== Veneration ==
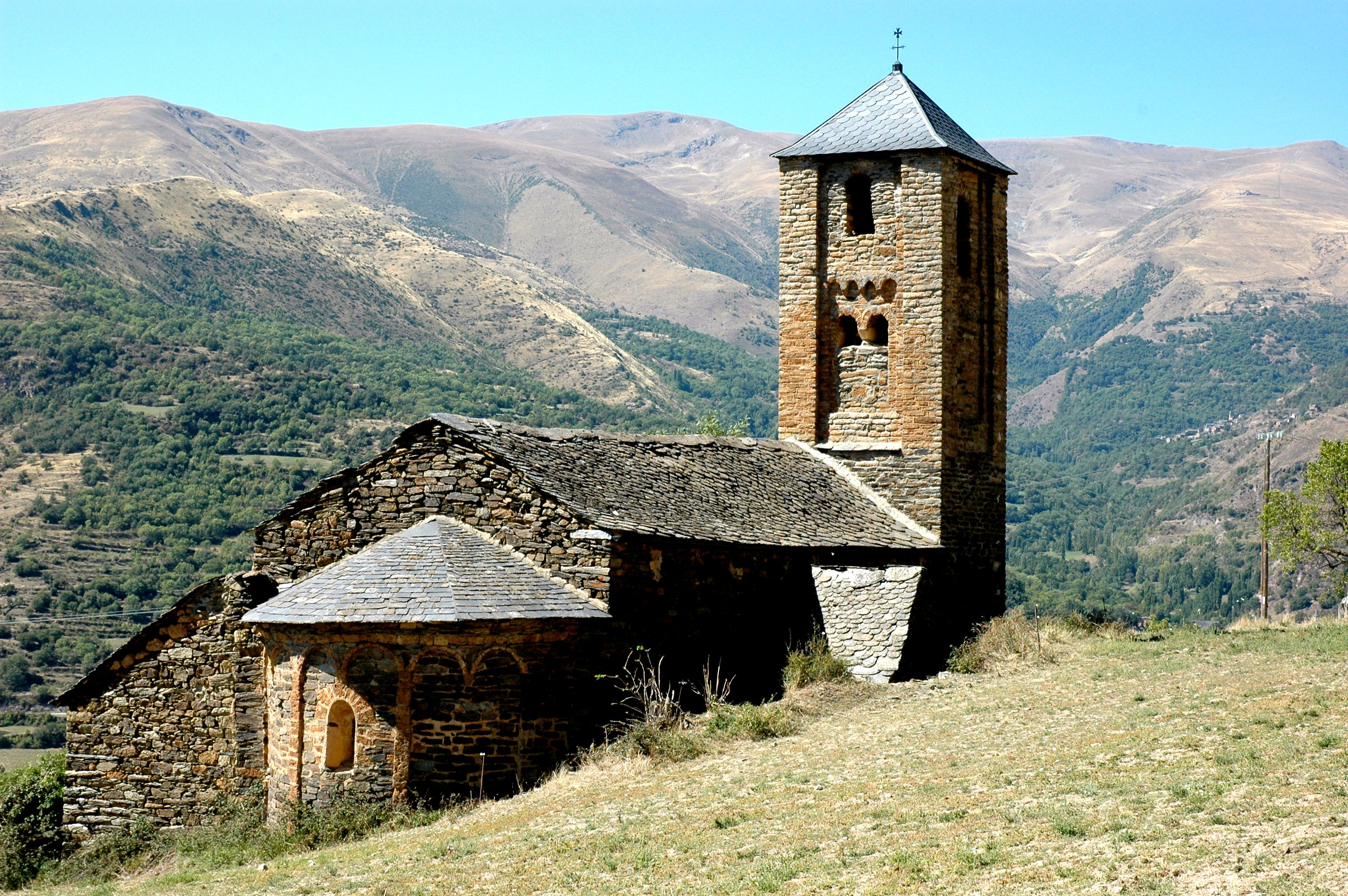
Church of Sant Acisclus y Santa Victoria de Surp.

Acisclus, along with his sister Victoria, are patron saints of Córdoba, and their cult was venerated throughout Hispania and southern France, especially in Provence. There was a minor church dedicated to Saint Acisclus on the slopes of Montserrat.

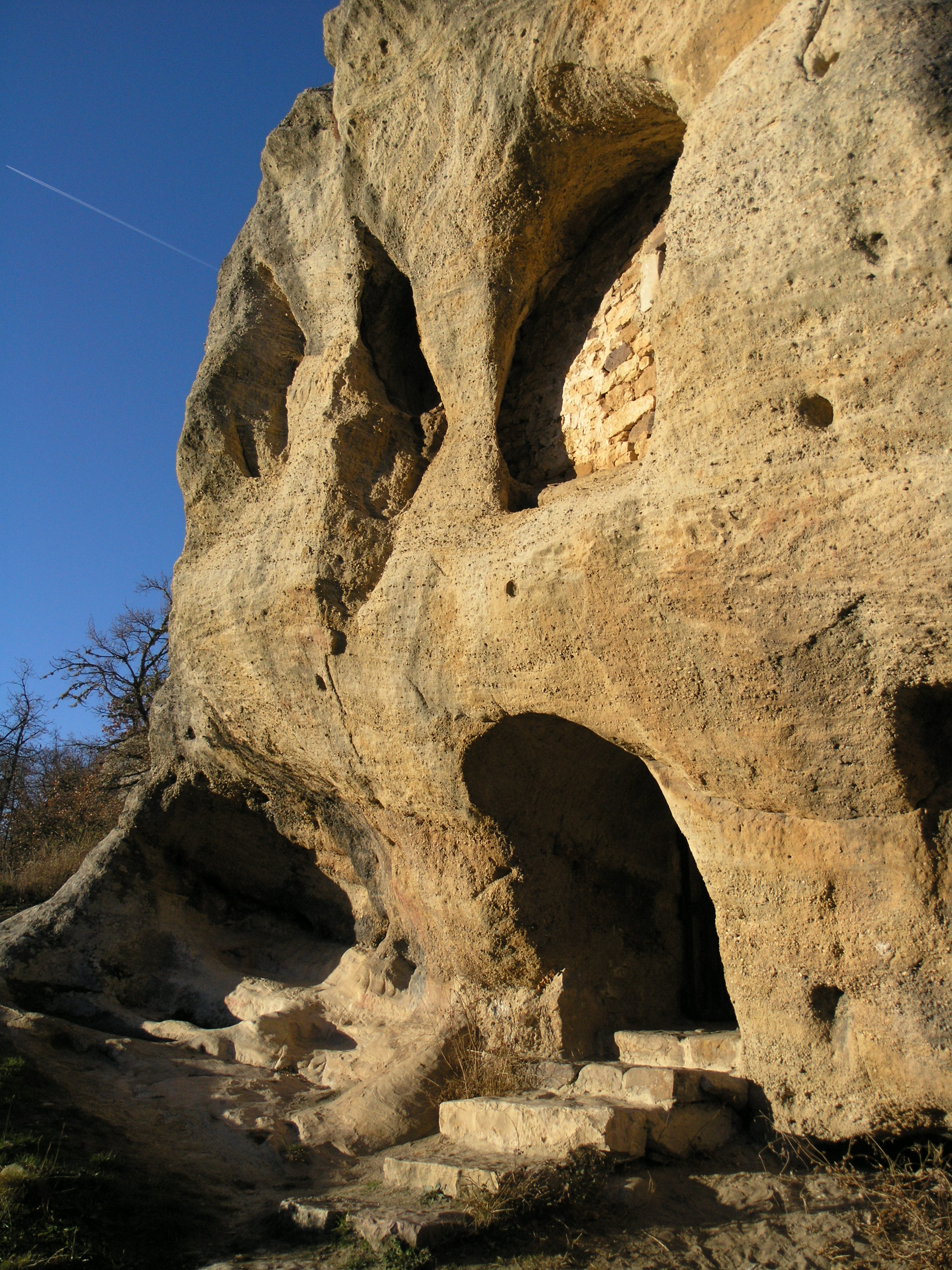
Chapel of Saints Acisclo and Victoria, in Arroyuelos (Valderredible, Spain). Cave church.

== Iconography ==
Acisclus and Victoria are represented in art as a young man and woman crowned with roses.

== Sources ==
- Saint of the Day: Acisclus
- Martyrdom without Miracles, Christian Martyrs in Muslim Hispania
- "Patronage and Piety: Montserrat and the Royal House of Medieval Catalonia-Aragon" Detailed history of the abbey (PDF)
- "Passio SS. Martyrum Aciscli & Victoriae" (in Latin, in xps format), in Enrique Florez, España Sagrada (Madrid: Antonio Marin, 1753), X, 485–491.
