= Aurelius and Natalia =

9th-century Andalusian Christian martyrs

- Died: 852, Córdoba, Al-Andalus
- Martyred by: Abd ar-Rahman II
- Means of martyrdom: Decapitation
- Venerated in: Roman Catholic Church; Eastern Orthodox Church
- Feast: 27 July

Aurelius and Natalia (died 852) were a married Christian couple who were executed by Abd ar-Rahman II, the Emir of Córdoba for refusing to renounce their faith. They are considered martyrs and saints by the Catholic Church and the Eastern Orthodox Church.

== Biography ==
Aurelius was born in Seville to a wealthy family. His father was a Muslim Arab and his mother a Christian Spaniard. Becoming an orphan as a child, Aurelius was raised by his aunt, who may have secretly been a Christian. At that time, Christians were being persecuted in the Moorish kingdoms in Spain.

When he was older, Aurelius, now a Christian, married Sabigotho, a girl from a Muslim family. After their marriage, Sabigotho decided to convert to Christianity and assumed the Christian name Natalia. Living in the Umayyad state of Córdoba, the couple had a daughter and secretly practised Christianity. According to Islamic rules, it is a capital offense to convert from Islam to Christianity.

One day, Aurelius witnessed the public whipping of a Christian merchant who had publicly proclaimed his Christianity. Horrified by this event, Aurelius and Natalia decided that they could no longer hide their beliefs. They put aside funds for their daughter and gave the rest of their money to the poor. They then began to openly proclaim their faith and minister to Christians in prison.

Having previously been Muslims, Aurelius and Natalia were arrested under Sharia Law as apostates. The courts gave them four days to recant, but they refused. On July 27, 852, the couple were beheaded.

== Veneration ==
The feast day for Aurelius and Natalia is 27 July. They are counted among the Martyrs of Córdoba, 48 Christians who were executed in that city between 850 and 859 AD

According to Catholic Exchange, the significance of Aurelius and Natalia is that it is futile for Christians to try and hide their faith in Christ, and that He will honor before God those who have the courage to speak up.

The relics of Saint Aurelius are enshrined in an altar in the Metropolitan Cathedral Basilica of Santa María la Antigua in Panama City, Panama.

== Sources ==
- Attwater, Donald and Catherine Rachel John. The Penguin Dictionary of Saints. 3rd edition. New York: Penguin Books, 1993. ISBN 0-14-051312-4.
- Bornos, Ángel (May 2007). Los santos más populares (in Spanish). Ediciones Robinbook. ISBN 978-84-7927-902-8.
- Butler, Alban; Burns, Paul (1 January 1995). Butler's Lives of the Saints. A&C Black. ISBN 978-0-86012-256-2.
- Gracia, Roberto Grao (6 February 2020). El siglo de los Laicos (in Spanish). Punto Rojo Libros. ISBN 978-84-18416-19-4.
