= Cathedral of St. James the Great, Beja =

Coordinates: 38.0170°N 7.8645°W

Cathedral of St. James the Great
- Sé Catedral de São Tiago Maior
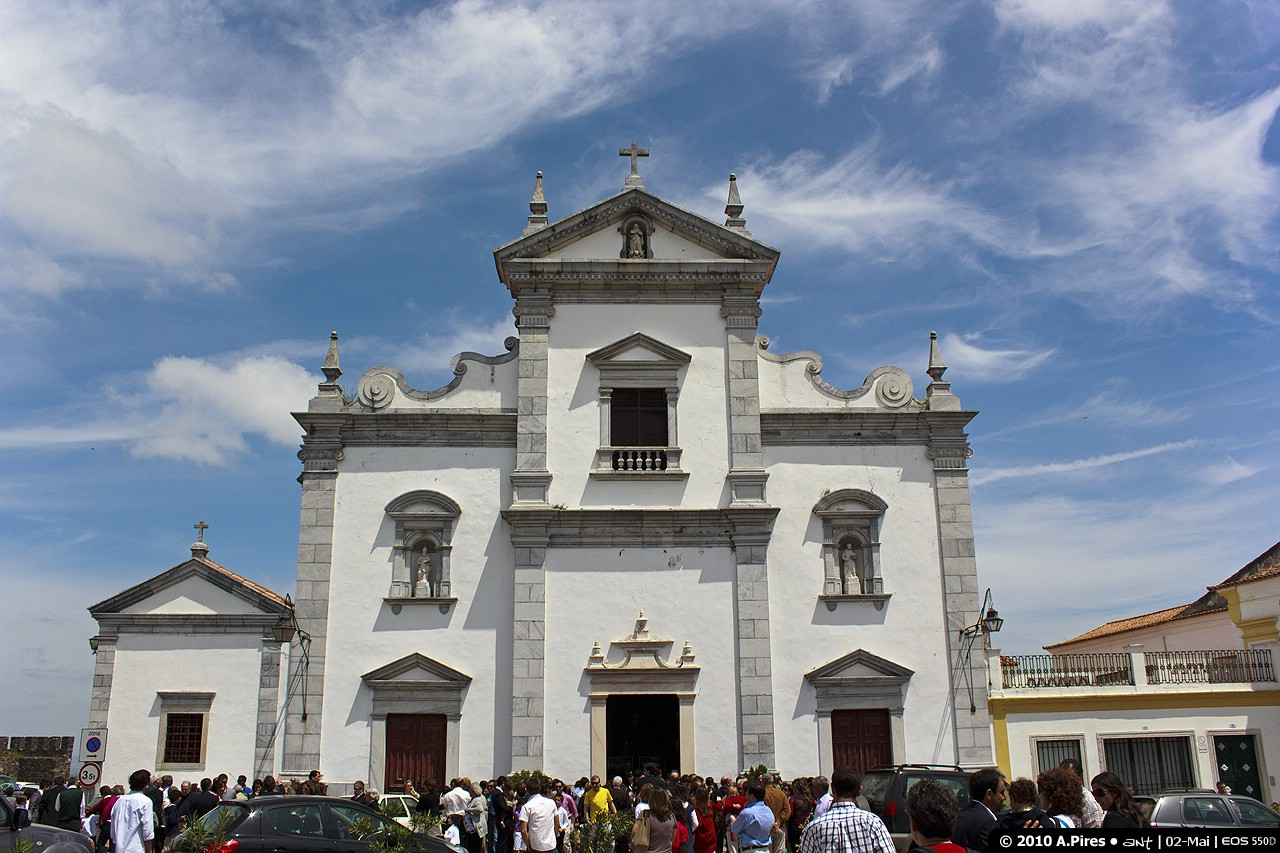
- Cathedral of St. James the Great
- Location: Beja
- Country: Portugal
- Denomination: Roman Catholic Church

The Cathedral of St. James the Great (Portuguese: Sé Catedral de São Tiago Maior) also called Beja Cathedral It is a religious building belonging to the Catholic Church and serves as the cathedral in Beja, Portugal, and the seat of the Diocese of Beja (Dioecesis Beiensis).

== See also ==
- Roman Catholicism in Portugal
