= Eulogius of Córdoba =

Spanish Orthodox bishop and saint

Saint Eulogius of Córdoba
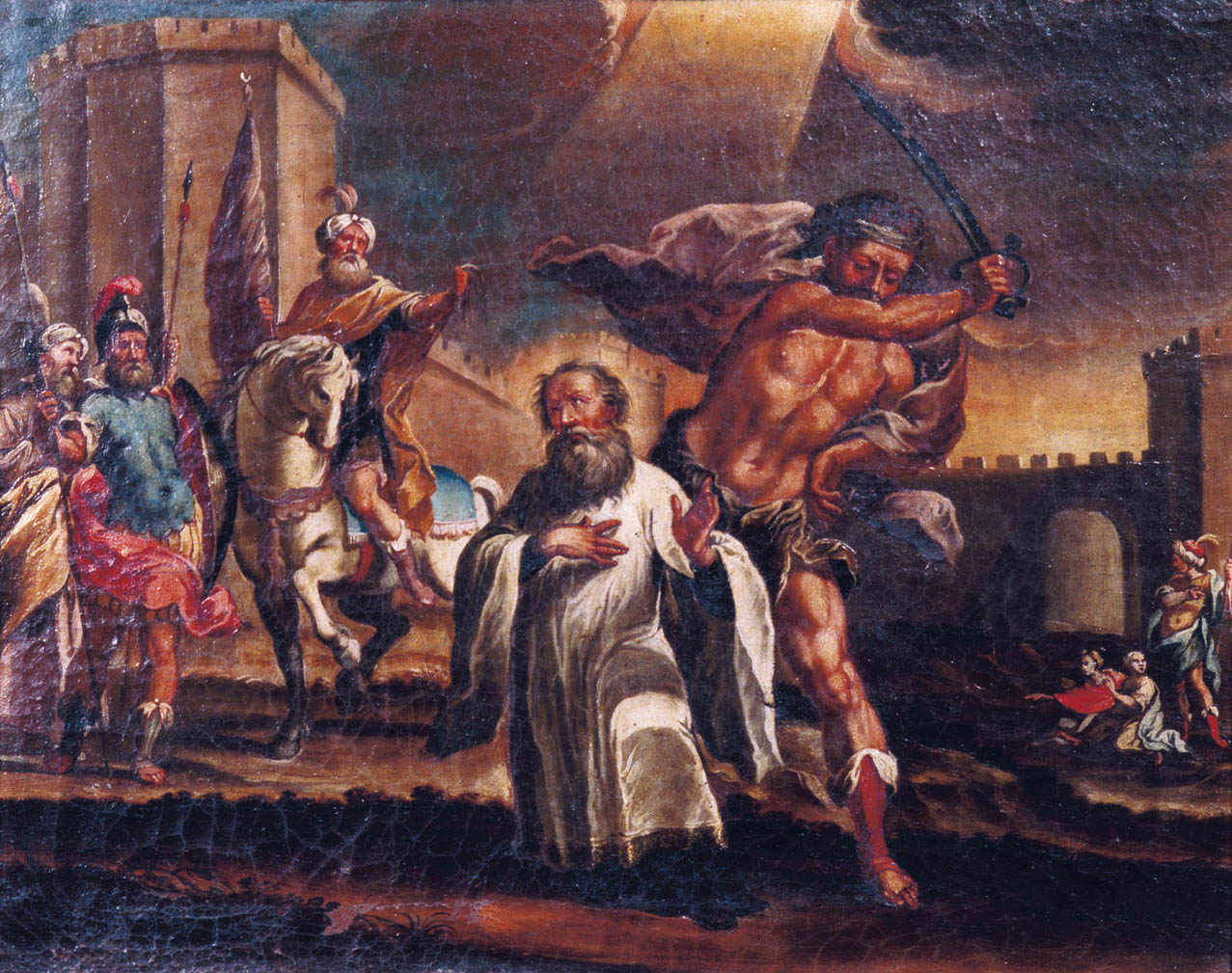
- The Martyrdom of Saint Eulogius of Córdoba, at Córdoba Cathedral, by an unknown artist of the 17th century.

Priest and Martyr
- Born: prior to 819; Córdoba, Caliphate of Cordoba (modern day Spain)
- Died: 11 March 859 (aged 39–40); Córdoba, Caliphate of Cordoba
- Venerated in: Orthodox Church, Roman Catholic Church
- Canonized: Pre-Congregation
- Major shrine: Cathedral of Oviedo
- Feast: 11 March

Saint Eulogius of Córdoba (Spanish: San Eulogio de Córdoba (died 11 March 859)) was one of the Martyrs of Córdoba. He lived during the reigns of the Cordovan emirs Abd ar-Rahman II and Muhammad I (mid-9th century).

== Background ==
In the ninth century, the Moorish conquerors of the southern half of the Iberian Peninsula made Córdoba their capital. Christians were accorded a subaltern status, and subject to a monthly tax. Though restricted, they were permitted to worship. Some, like Eulogius's younger brother, rose to high positions in the government. In the large cities like Toledo and Córdoba, Christians in some cases observed the civil laws that applied during the time of Visigothic rule. The government was exercised by the comes (count), president of the council of senators.

During this time, the faithful could, it is true, worship freely, and retained their churches and property on condition of paying a tribute for every parish, cathedral, and monastery; frequently such tribute was increased at the will of the conqueror, and often the living had to pay for the dead. Many of the faithful then fled to Northern Spain; others took refuge in the monasteries of Sierras, and thus the number of Christians shrank eventually to small proportions.

Under Abd-er Rahman II there came a change in the attitude of the Arab rulers, and a fierce persecution ensued, during which many Christians were accused of abusing the memory of Mohammed, of entering mosques, and of conspiracy against the Government.

== Early life ==
It is not certain on what date or in what year of the 9th century he was born; it must have been before 819, because in 848 he was a highly esteemed priest among the Christians of Catalonia and Navarre, and priesthood was conferred only on men thirty years of age.

The family of the saint was of the senatorial class and held land in Córdoba from Roman times. The saint, like his five brothers, received an excellent education in accord with his good birth and under the guardianship of his mother Isabel. The youngest of the brothers, Joseph, held a high office in the palace of Abd-er-Rahman II; two other brothers, Alvarus and Isidore, were merchants and traded on a large scale as far as Central Europe. Of his sisters, Niola and Anulona, the first remained with her mother; the second was educated from infancy in a monastery where she later became a nun.

== Career ==
After completing his studies in the monastery of St. Zoilus, St. Eulogius continued to live with his family the better to care for his mother; also, perhaps, to study with famous masters, one of whom was Abbot Speraindeo, an illustrious writer of that time. He distinguished himself, by his virtue and learning, and, being made priest, was placed at the head of the chief ecclesiastical school at Cordova.

In the meantime he found a friend in the celebrated Alvarus Paulus, a fellow-student, and they cultivated together all branches of science, sacred and profane, within their reach. Their correspondence in prose and verse filled volumes; later they agreed to destroy it as too exuberant and lacking in polish. Alvarus married, but St. Eulogius preferred the ecclesiastical career, and was finally ordained a priest by Bishop Reccafred of Cordova.

During 848, Eulogius visited monasteries in northern Iberia, among them San Zacharias, where he received texts of St. Augustine, Horace, Juvenal and Virgil and brought them back to Cordoba.

== Character ==
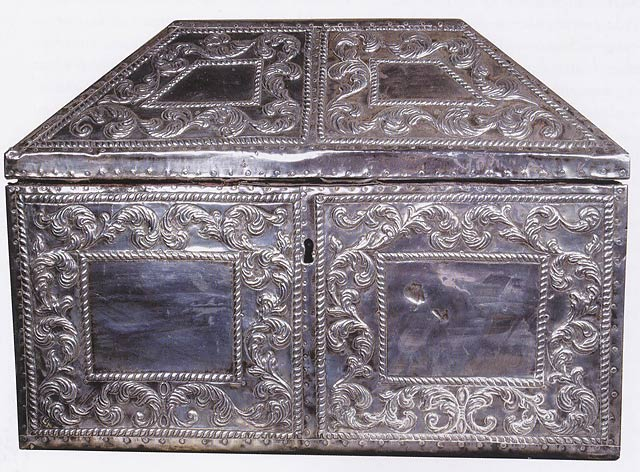
A silver reliquary containing the remains of Saints Eulogius and Leocritia of Cordoba, in Camara Santa, Oviedo Cathedral, Oviedo, Spain.

St. Eulogius's friend and biographer Paulus Alvarus affectionately described him as gentle, reverent, well-educated, steeped in Scripture, and so humble that he freely submitted to opinions of others less informed than he. He said that Eulogius had a pleasant demeanor and conducted his relationships with such kindness that everyone regarded him as a friend. A gifted leader, the most prominent among his charisma was the ability to give encouragement. As a priest serving in an occupied country, he used this gift to strengthen his friends in the face of danger.

This humility shone particularly on two occasions. In his youth he had decided to make a foot pilgrimage to Rome; notwithstanding his great fervour and his devotion to the sepulchre of the Prince of the Apostles (a notable proof of the union of the Mozarabic rite Church with Rome), he gave up his project, yielding to the advice of prudent friends. Again, during the Muslim persecution, in 850, after reading a passage of the works of St. Epiphanius he decided to refrain for a time from saying Mass that he might better defend the cause of the martyrs; however, at the request of his bishop, Saul of Córdoba, he put aside his scruples. His extant writings are proof that Alvarus did not exaggerate.

They give an account of what is most important from 848 to 859 in Iberian Christianity, both without and within the Muslim dominions, especially of the lives of the martyrs who suffered during the Muslim persecution, Queaque ipsa miserrima vidi, et quorum pars magna fui. (transl. and those terrible things I saw, and in which I played a great part)

However, in 850 the Muslims began to persecute Christians because some had spoken against Mohammed and converted Muslims to Christianity. They imprisoned the bishop and priests of Cordoba, including Eulogius. In jail, the saint read the Bible to his companions, exhorting them to faithfulness.

The earliest account of the Quran in a language other than Arabic is Sura al-Ahzab verse 37, translated in the Storia de Mahometh, which Eulogius copied into his Liber apologeticus around the year 857.

In 859, a virgin named Leocritia of a noble family of the Moors was converted and sought his protection against her irate parents. St. Eulogius hid her among friends for a time, but eventually they were all discovered and condemned to death. St. Eulogius was beheaded on 11 March 859, and St. Leocritia four days later on 15 March 859. Paul Alvarus' Life of Eulogius records that a dove was seen flying above his martyred body, portraying his peacefulness and innocence, which could not be killed despite the attempts of the angered Muslims.

St. Eulogius was chosen to fill the vacant Archepiscopal See of Toledo, but could not be consecrated as Archbishop of Toledo, owing to his imprisonment shortly before his execution by beheading. St. Eulogius left a perfect account of the orthodox doctrine which he defended, the intellectual culture which he propagated, the imprisonment and sufferings which he endured; in a word, his writings show that he followed to the letter the exhortation of St. Paul: Imitatores mei estote sicut et ego Christi ("follow my example, as I follow that of Christ").

St. Eulogius is buried in the Cathedral of Oviedo. His feast day is 11 March.

== See also ==
- Martyrs of Córdoba
- Saint Laura
- Nunilo and Alodia, martyred at Bosca
- Aurelius and Natalia
- Pelagius of Córdoba

== Sources ==
- Tolan, John, Medieval Christian Perceptions of Islam, New York: Routledge, 2000. ISBN 0-8153-1426-4
