= Martyrs of Córdoba =

Christian martyrs in medieval Islamic Spain

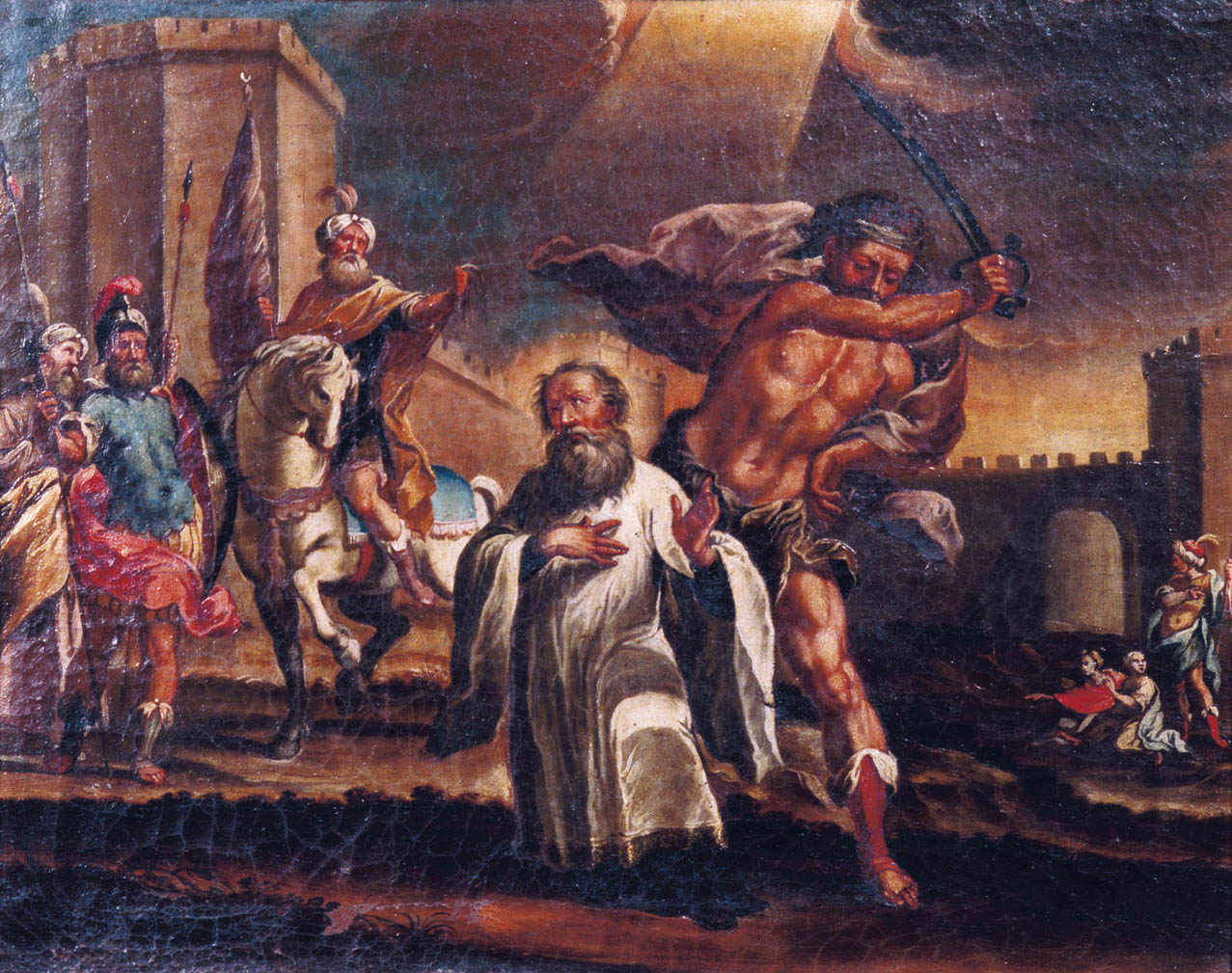
- The Martyrdom of Saint Eulogius of Córdoba, at Córdoba Cathedral, by an unknown artist of the 17th century.
- Died: Between 850 and 859, Córdoba, al-Andalus (modern-day Spain)
- Martyred by: Abd ar-Rahman II, Muhammad I of Córdoba
- Means of martyrdom: Decapitation
- Venerated in: Eastern Orthodox Church; Roman Catholic Church
- Notable martyrs: Aurelius and Natalia, Eulogius, Perfectus, Sisenandus, Roderick

The Martyrs of Córdoba were forty-eight Christian martyrs executed under the rule of the Muslim administration in al-Andalus for capital violations of Islamic law, namely blasphemy and apostasy, between 850 and 859 AD.

Some of the Christian martyrs were executed for apostasy and blasphemy after they appeared before the Muslim authorities and insulted the Islamic prophet Muhammad, although there was a minority case in which some of them were accused of such violations by witnesses. The witnesses at points have exaggerated the scale of the statements made by the martyrs. This was however rare, as the Mālikī judges would ask for a testimony. One example we have is the case of Perfectus who was accused of insulting Muhammad and was asked to testify. When he testified he stated that Muhammad had committed fornication and he thought of Islam as "a corrupt form of Christianity"; he was then executed for this. It has been stated he was aware of the punishment for making such a statement.

The Mālikī jurist al-Qayrawānī (d. 996) distinguished between two kinds of insult: an outright attack against Islam, made by ill intent and therefore punishable by death according to the Islamic death penalty, and a simple declaration of one's own religion. In this last case, the Christian could not be held accountable for this offense. If one insulted Islam beyond the needs of his religion, he or she would have to be executed. The lack of another source after Eulogius's own martyrdom has given way to the misimpression that there were fewer episodes later in the 9th century. There has also been skepticism on the account he himself was a "martyr". While Perfectus could have been liable for breaking the first law, he could not be held guilty on account of his religion. The attempt to persuade him and to dismiss his offense constitutes part of the legal proceeding and reveals a keen knowledge of local trial custom.

== Historical background ==
In 711 AD, a Muslim army of Moors from North Africa had invaded and conquered the territories that previously belonged to the Visigothic Kingdom, which comprised the Christian Iberia. Under their leader Tariq ibn-Ziyad, they landed at Gibraltar and brought most of the Iberian Peninsula under Islamic rule in an eight-year campaign. The Iberian Peninsula was called Al-Andalus by its Muslim rulers. When the Umayyad caliphs were deposed in Damascus in 750 AD, the dynasty relocated to Córdoba, ruling an emirate there; consequently the city gained in luxury and importance, as a center of Iberian Muslim culture.

Once the Muslims had conquered Iberia, they governed it in accordance with Islamic law (sharīʿa). Blasphemy and apostasy from Islam were both capital offenses. In the Islamic religion, blasphemy includes insulting Muhammad and the Muslim faith. Apostasy is the crime of converting away from Islam. Under Islamic law, anyone whose father is Muslim is automatically a Muslim at birth and will automatically be guilty of apostasy if they proclaim any faith other than Islam. Anyone found guilty of either blasphemy or apostasy was swiftly executed in accordance with the Islamic death penalty.

Since they are considered "People of the Book" in the Islamic religion, Christians under Muslim rule were subjected to the status of dhimmi (along with Jews, Samaritans, Gnostics, Mandeans, and Zoroastrians), which was inferior to the status of Muslims. During this time, Christians could retain their churches and property on condition of paying tributes (the jizya and kharaj taxes) for every parish, cathedral, and monastery; frequently such tribute was increased at the will of the conqueror. Christians also had to abstain from any public displays of their faith in the presence of Muslims, as such an act was considered blasphemy under Islamic law and punishable by death penalty. In order to escape and free themselves from the Muslim rule, many Christians fled to the Christian kingdoms in Northern Spain; others took refuge in the monasteries of Sierras. Still others converted in order to gain economic and political favors or to avoid the jizya tax, and thus the number of Christians in Al-Andalus shrank eventually to small proportions.

In 786 AD the Muslim caliph of Al-Andalus, Abd al-Rahman I, began the construction of the great mosque of Córdoba (now a Christian cathedral), and compelled many Christians to take part in the preparation of the site and foundations. The executions of the martyrs caused tension not only between Muslims and Christians, but within the entire Christian community of Al-Andalus. Abd al-Rahman II at first ordered the arrest and detention of the clerical leadership of the local Christian community of Córdoba. As the civil disobedience seemed to subside, the Christian clergymen were released in November 851 AD. When several months later there was a new wave of protests, the emir turned again to the Christian leaders as the ones most capable of controlling the Christian community. Instead of imprisoning them, he ordered them to convene a council in Córdoba to review the matter and develop some strategy for dealing with the dissidents internally. He gave the bishops a choice: Christians could stop the public dissent or face harassment, loss of jobs, and economic hardship. Upon the death of Abd-al Rahman II in 852 AD, his son and successor Muhammad I removed all Christian officials from their palace appointments.

Reccafred, bishop of Córdoba, urged compromise with the Muslim authorities. The closures of monasteries where some of the martyrs had lived occurred towards the middle of the 9th century. The Christian monk and Latinist scholar Eulogius, who has been venerated as a saint from the 9th century onwards, viewed the bishop as siding with Muslim authorities against the Iberian Christians. Eulogius encouraged the public declarations of the Christian faith as a way to reinforce the identity and cohesion of the Christian community in Al-Andalus and protest against the Islamic laws that Christians saw as unjust towards their rights and religion. He composed tractates and martyrologies, of which a single manuscript, containing his Documentum martyriale, the three books of his Memoriale sanctorum, and his Liber apologeticus martyrum was preserved in Oviedo, in the Christian Kingdom of Asturias, located in the far Northwestern coast of Hispania. The relics of Eulogius were moved there in 884 AD.

== Causes ==
Wolf points out that it is important to distinguish between the motivations of the individual martyrs, and those of Eulogius and Alvarus in writing the Memoriale. Jessica A. Coope says that while it would be wrong to ascribe a single motive to all forty-eight, she suggests that it reflects a protest against the process of assimilation. They demonstrated a determination to assert Christian identity. Wolf maintains that it is necessary to view the actions of the martyrs in the context of the penitential aspect of 9th century Iberian Christianity. "Martyrdom was in fact a perfect solution... Not only did it epitomize self-abnegation and separation from the world, but it guaranteed that there would be no opportunity to sin again."

== The executions ==
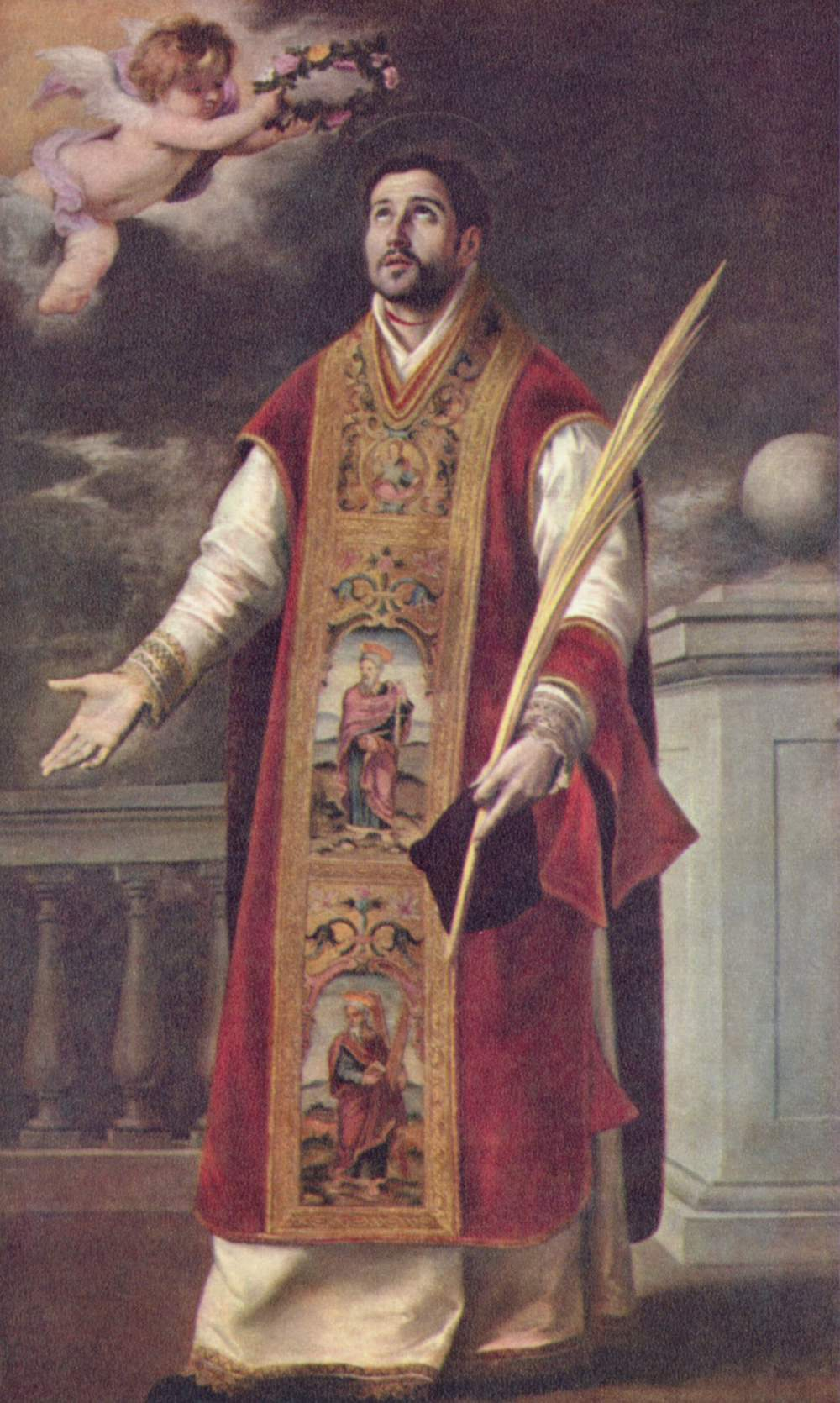
Roderick, a priest of Cabra, Spain, executed at Córdoba, Bartolomé Esteban Perez Murillo

The forty-eight Christians (mostly monks) were martyred in Córdoba, between the years 850 AD and 859 AD, being decapitated for announcing their apostasy publicly and blaspheming against Islam.

The detailed Acta of these martyrs were ascribed to the aptly named "Eulogius" ("blessing"), who was one of the last two to die. Although most of the martyrs of Córdoba were Hispanic, either Baeto-Roman or Visigothic, one name is from Septimania, another Arab or Berber, and another of indeterminate nationality. There were also connections with the Christian East: one of the martyrs was Syrian, another an Arab or Greek monk from Palestine, and two others had distinctive Greek names. The Greek element recalls the Byzantine interlude of power in southernmost Hispania Baetica: representatives of the Byzantine Empire had been invited to help settle a Visigothic dynastic struggle, but had stayed on, as a hoped-for spearhead to a "Reconquest" of the far west envisaged by emperor Justinian I.

== List of martyrs ==
The following list is from Kenneth Wolf's Christian Martyrs in Muslim Spain.

=== Charged with blasphemy ===
- Perfectus – April 18, 850. A priest in Córdoba beheaded for denouncing Islam and stating the prophet Muhammad committed fornication.
- Isaac – June 3, 851. Born to a wealthy Córdoban family, he was well educated and fluent in Arabic which helped him rise quickly to the position of exceptor rei publicae in the Moorish government. He resigned in order to become a monk at his family's monastery of Tábanos, a few miles from Córdoba. One day he left his retreat and returned to the emir's palace where he proclaimed his faith in Christ in front of the court. He was arrested and subsequently beheaded.
- Sancho – (also known as Sanctius, Sancius) June 5, 851. Born in Albi in Septimania (modern-day France), he was taken to Córdoba in Al-Andalus as a prisoner of war, educated at the royal court, and enrolled in the guards of the Emir. He was beheaded for the crime of blasphemy under unknown circumstances, just two weeks after the death of Isaac. The passio that Eulogius composed for Sanctius is unusually brief.

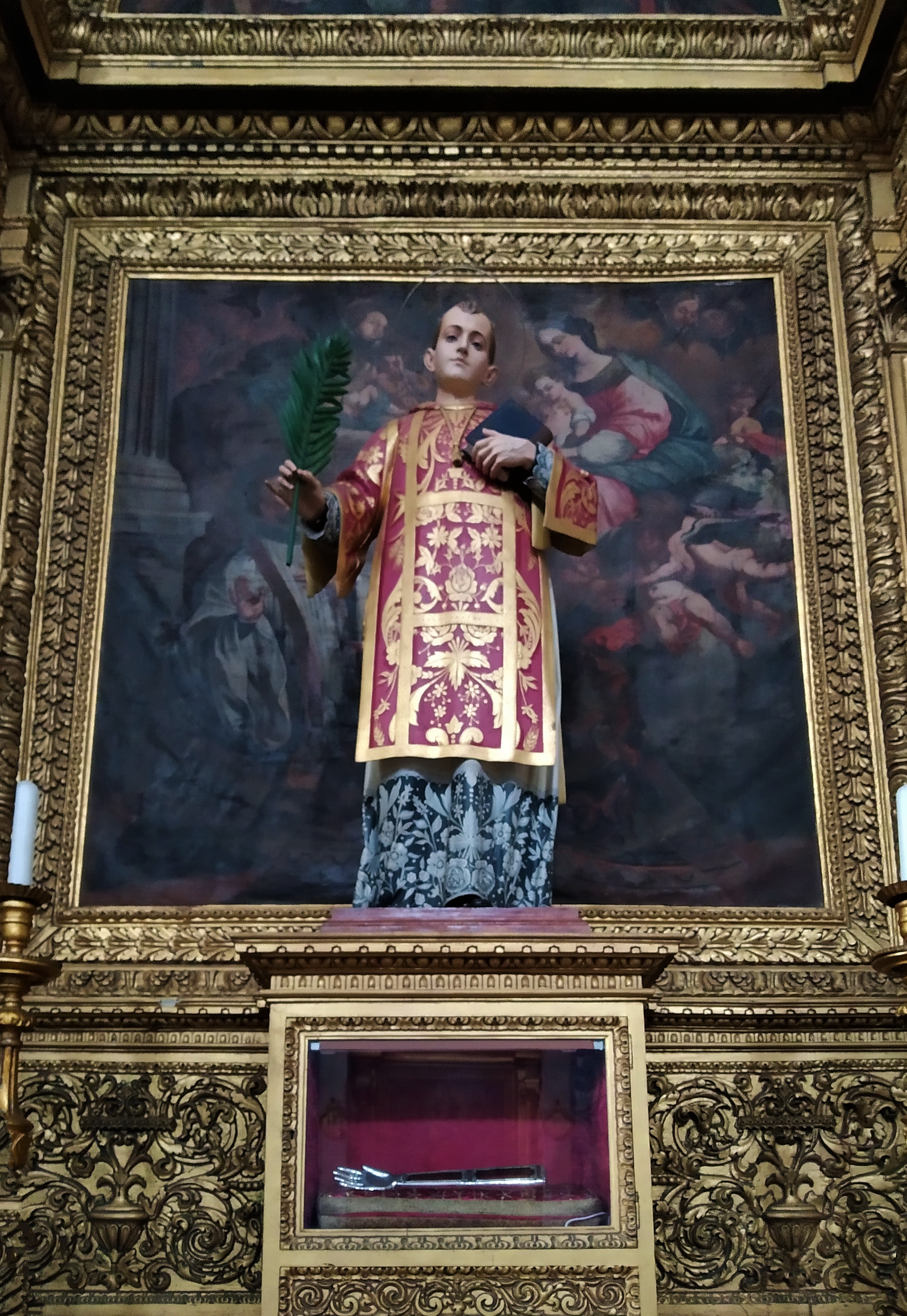
Altar and reliquary of Saint Sisenandus, Cathedral of St. James the Great, Beja

- Peter, Walabonsus, Sabinian, Wistremundus, Habentius and Jeremiah – June 7, 851. Peter was a priest; Walabonsus, a deacon; Sabinian and Wistremundus, monks of St Zoilus in Córdoba in Al-Andalus; Habentius, a monk of St Christopher's; Jeremiah, a very old man, had founded the monastery of Tábanos, near Córdoba. For publicly denouncing Muhammad they were executed under Abderrahman in Córdoba. Jeremiah was scourged to death; the others were beheaded.
- Sisenandus – July 16, 851. Born in Beja in Portugal, he became a deacon in the church of St Acisclus in Córdoba. He was beheaded under Abd ar-Rahman II.
- Paul of St Zoilus – July 20, 851. A deacon in Córdoba who belonged to the monastery of St Zoilus and who ministered to Christians imprisoned by the Muslims. He was beheaded; his relics are enshrined in the church of St Zoilus.
- Theodemir – July 25, 851. A monk executed in Córdoba in Al-Andalus under Abd ar-Rahman II.
- Flora and Maria – November 24, 851. These two women were both the offspring of marriages between a Christian and a Muslim. In addition, Maria was the sister of Walabonsus, who had been executed earlier. Flora's father, who died when she was very young, was a Muslim, and so her Christianity was legally defined as apostasy. Although Maria and Flora denounced Islam and proclaimed their Christian faith in court together, Maria was executed for blasphemy and Flora for apostasy.
- Gumesindus and Servusdei – January 13, 852. Gusemindus, a parish-priest, and Servusdei, a monk, were executed in Cordoba under Abd ar-Rahman II.
- Leovigild and Christopher – August 20, 852. Leovigild was a monk and pastor in Córdoba and Christopher a monk of the monastery of St Martin de La Rojana near Córdoba. They were executed in Córdoba under Abd ar-Rahman II.
- Emilas and Jeremiah – September 15, 852. Two young men, the former of whom was a deacon, imprisoned and beheaded in Cordoba under the Emir Abderrahman.
- Rogellus and Servus-Dei – September 16, 852. A monk and his young disciple executed in Córdoba for publicly denouncing Islam inside a mosque. They were the first Christian martyrs executed under Muhammad I.
- Fandilas – June 13, 853. A priest and Abbot of Peñamelaria near Córdoba. He was beheaded in Córdoba by order of Muhammad I.
- Anastasius, Felix, and Digna – June 14, 853. Anastasius was a deacon of the church of St. Acisclus in Córdoba, who became a monk at nearby Tábanos. Felix was born in Alcalá of a Berber family, became a monk in Asturias but joined the monastery at Tábanos, hoping for martyrdom. Digna belonged to the convent there.
- Benildis – June 15, 853. Anastasius' execution inspired this woman of Cordoba to choose martyrdom herself the next day. Her ashes were thrown into the Guadalquivir.
- Columba – September 17, 853. Born in Córdoba and a nun at Tábanos, she was detained with the rest of the nuns, to prevent them from giving themselves up to the courts, when the Emirate closed the monastery in 852. She escaped, openly denounced Muhammad and was beheaded.
- Pomposa – September 19, 853. Another nun, from the monastery of San Salvador at Peñamelaria. She escaped the imprisonment of the nuns, went before the court and was executed, despite protests from her fellow nuns.
- Abundius – July 11, 854. A parish priest in Ananelos, a village near Córdoba. He was arrested for having maligned Muhammad. Unlike most of the other martyrs, Abundius was betrayed by others and did not volunteer to face the Emir's court. He was beheaded and his body was thrown to the dogs. His feast day is celebrated on July 11.
- Amator, Peter and Louis – April 30, 855. Amator was born in Martos, near Córdoba, where he was an ordained priest. Together with a monk named Peter and a layman called Louis (Ludovicus), the brother of the previous martyr Paul, he was executed by the Emirate for blaspheming Islam.
- Witesindus – (also known as Witesind) 855. A Christian layman from Cabra, who had converted to Islam but later recanted; he was executed for apostasy.
- Elias, Paul and Isidore – April 17, 856. Elias, born in Beja in Portugal and a priest in Córdoba, was executed in his old age by the Moors, together with the young monks Paul and Isidore, two of his students. According to the "Great Synaxaristes", their feast day in the Eastern Orthodox Church is on April 30.
- Argymirus – (also known as Argimirus, Argimir) June 28, 856. Argimir, a nobleman from Cabra, was Emir Muhammad I's censor. He was deprived of his office on account of his faith and became a monk. He was accused by others of having insulted the prophet Muhammad and publicly proclaimed the divinity of Jesus. Argimir was offered mercy if he renounced Christianity and professed Islam; he refused, and was executed.

=== Charged with apostasy ===
- George, Aurelius and Sabigotho/Natalia; Felix and Liliosa – July 27 c. 852. Martyrs in Córdoba under Emir Abd ar-Rahman II. Aurelius and Felix, with their wives, Sanigotho (Natalia) and Liliosa, were Iberians whose family backgrounds, although religiously mixed, legally required them to profess Islam. After given four days to recant, they were condemned as apostates for revealing their previously secret Christian faith. The deacon George was a monk from Palestine who was arrested along with the two couples. Though offered a pardon as a foreigner, he chose to denounce Islam again and die with the others.
- Aurea of Córdoba (also known as Aura) – July 19, 856. Born in Córdoba in Al-Andalus and a daughter of Muslim parents. She witnessed the execution of her brothers, Adolphus and John on 27 September 822 (their feast day). In her widowhood she quietly became a Christian and a nun at Cuteclara, where she remained for more than 30 years. She was discovered by Muslim relatives, brought before a judge, and renounced her Christianity under duress. However, she regretted this, and continued to practice Christianity in secret. Her family brought charges against her again, and when she refused to recant her Christian faith again, was executed.
- Rudericus (Roderick) and Salomon (Solomon) – March 13, 857. Roderick was a priest in Cabra who was betrayed by his Muslim brother, who falsely accused him of converting to Islam and then returning to Christianity (i.e. apostasy). In prison he met his fellow-martyr, Salomon. They were both executed in Córdoba.
- Eulogius of Cordoba – March 11, 859. A prominent priest in Córdoba Al-Andalus during this period. Outstanding for his courage and learning, he encouraged some of the voluntary martyrs and wrote The Memorial of the Saints for their benefit. He himself was executed for aiding and abetting apostasy by hiding and protecting a young girl St. Leocritia that had converted from Islam.
- Leocritia (also known as Lucretia) – March 15, 859. A young girl in Córdoba. Her parents were Muslims, but she was converted to Christianity by a relative. On Eulogius's advice and with his aid, Leocritia escaped her home and went into hiding. Once found, both were arrested. Eulogius, after years of being in and out of prison and encouraging voluntary martyrdom, was executed for proselytization, and Leocritia for apostasy.
- Sandila (also known as Sandalus, Sandolus, Sandulf) – September 3 c. 855. Executed in Córdoba under the Emirate.

== See also ==
- Saint Laura
- Nunilo and Alodia, martyred at Bosca
- Aurelius and Natalia
- Pelagius of Córdoba
- Reconquista
