= Abd al-Rahman II =

Emir of Cordoba from 822 to 852

Abd al-Rahman al-Awsat عبد الرحمن الأوسط
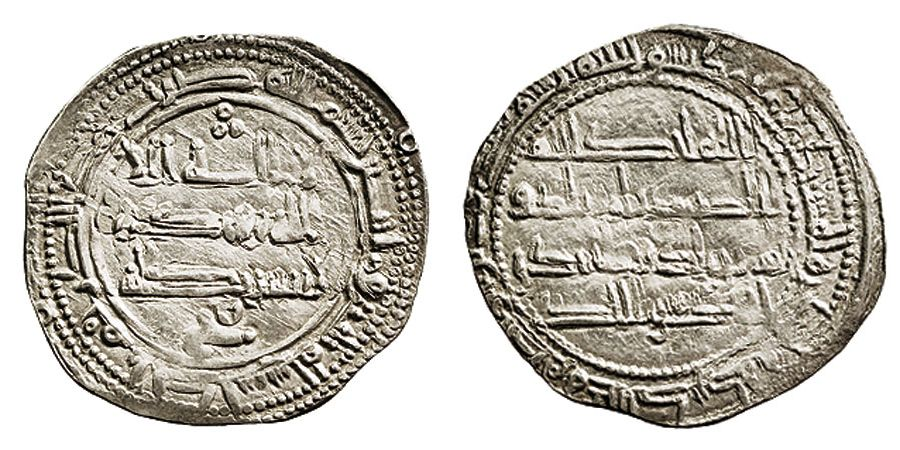
- Silver dirham coined during the reign of Abd al-Rahman II

4th Emir of Córdoba
- Reign: 21 May 822–852
- Predecessor: al-Hakam I
- Successor: Muhammad I
- Born: 792; Toledo, Emirate of Córdoba
- Died: 852 (aged 59–60); Córdoba, Emirate of Córdoba
- Issue: Muhammad I of Córdoba
- Dynasty: Umayyad (Marwanid)
- Father: al-Hakam I
- Mother: Halawah

Abd al-Rahman II (Arabic: عبد الرحمن الأوسط; 792–852) was the fourth Umayyad Emir of Córdoba in al-Andalus from 822 until his death in 852. A vigorous and effective frontier warrior, he was also well known as a patron of the arts.

Abd al-Rahman was born in Toledo in 792. He was the son of Emir al-Hakam I. In his youth he took part in the so-called "massacre of the ditch", when 72 nobles and hundreds of their attendants were massacred at a banquet by order of al-Hakam.

He succeeded his father as Emir of Córdoba in 822 and for 20 years engaged in nearly continuous warfare against Alfonso II of Asturias, whose southward advance he halted. In 825, he had a new city, Murcia, built, and proceeded to settle it with Arab loyalists to ensure stability. In 835, he confronted rebellious citizens of Mérida by having a large internal fortress built. In 837, he suppressed a revolt of Christians and Jews in Toledo with similar measures. He issued a decree by which the Christians were forbidden to seek martyrdom, and he had a Christian synod held to forbid martyrdom.

In 839 or 840, he sent an embassy under al-Ghazal to Constantinople to sign a pact with the Byzantine Empire against the Abbasids. Another embassy was sent which may have either gone to Ireland or Denmark, likely encouraging trade in fur and slaves.

In 844, Abd al-Rahman repulsed an assault by Vikings who had disembarked in Cádiz, conquered Seville (with the exception of its citadel) and attacked Córdoba itself. Thereafter he constructed a fleet and naval arsenal at Seville to repel future raids.

He responded to William of Septimania's requests of assistance in his struggle against Charles the Bald who had claimed lands William considered to be his.

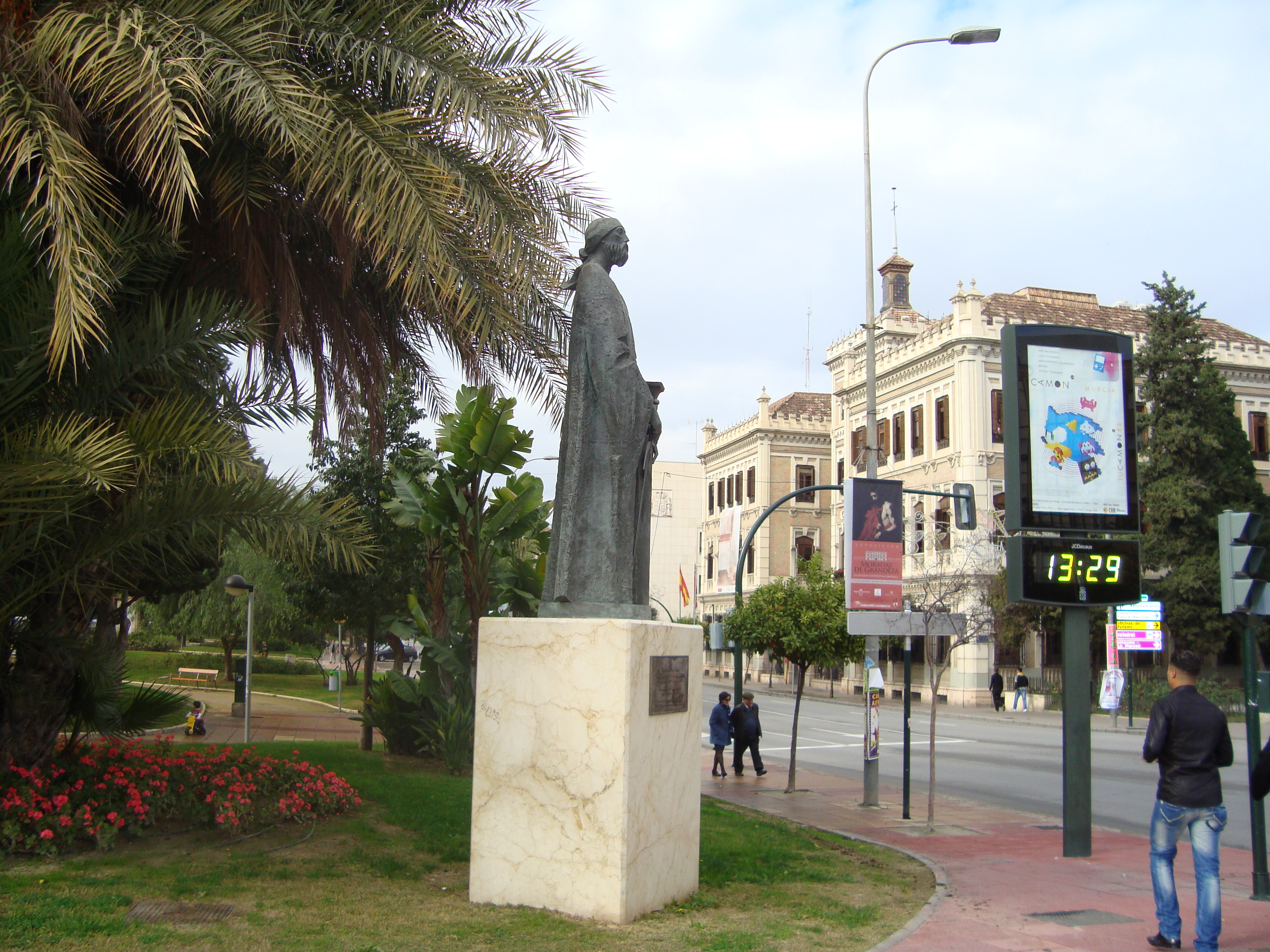
Statue of Abd al-Rahman II in Murcia, Spain

Abd al-Rahman was famous for his public building program in Córdoba. He made additions to the Mosque–Cathedral of Córdoba. A vigorous and effective frontier warrior, he was also well known as a patron of the arts. He was also involved in the execution of the "Martyrs of Córdoba", and was a patron of the great composer Ziryab. He died in 852 in Córdoba.

Abd al-Rahman II Banu Umayyah Cadet branch of the Banu Quraish Died: 852
Preceded by al-Hakam I	Emir of Córdoba; 822–852	Succeeded by Muhammad I
