= Mozarabic Universal History =

The Mozarabic Universal History (MUH) is an anonymous Arabic universal history known from a single incomplete copy in a manuscript from about 1300. In the 20th century, it was discovered in the library of the Great Mosque of Kairouan by Ḥasan Ḥusnī ʿAbd al-Wahhāb and identified byr Giorgio Levi Della Vida as a Mozarabic text. In its present state, it covers the period from downfall of the Israelite king Saul to the Arab conquest of Spain from a biblical and Christian perspective.

A page from the MUH (before attempted restoration in the 1980s)

== Synopsis and sources ==
In the analysis of Levi Della Vida, the MUH was modelled on the Chronicon of Jerome and the chronicles of Isidore of Seville. To Mayte Penelas, on the other hand, it is less a coherent narrative than "a series of reports that were selected according to criteria that are not immediately apparent." One of its primary sources is the Vulgate Bible, although its rendering of this material in Arabic is rather free. In one case, it contains Latin glosses in the margins.

The MUH has not been preserved complete. It is surmised to have begun with an account of Creation, but its beginning is lost. The earliest surviving passage is an account of David supplanting Saul as king derived from the biblical First Book of Samuel. It provides an overview of biblical history based on Samuel, Kings, Daniel, Esther and Maccabees. This material is supplemented at times from nonbiblical sources, such as Jerome's Commentary on Daniel. The few passages of secular history are taken from the Kitāb Hurūshiyūsh, an Arabic translation, abridgement and adaptation of Orosius' Seven Books of History Against the Pagans.

The MUH moves on from biblical sources in its account of early Christian history. It also begins to include more secular material. Its account of the dispersion of the Apostles depends either upon chapter 80 of Isidore's De ortu et obitu patrum—a chapter not written by Isidore—or else on a related source. It recounts the Mozarabic legend of the Seven Apostolic Men who taught the Spanish clergy to shave. The story of Simon Magus from Acts is retold with much embellishment not found in other legendary retellings.

The last episode in the MUH is the Arab conquest of Spain.

== Transmission ==
The MUH is preserved in a single manuscript copied about the year 1300 and once kept in the Great Mosque of Kairouan. Today, it is MS 2003/2 in the National Museum of Islamic Art in Raqqāda. It is an incomplete copy, the manuscript having lost its beginning. It conists of 50 leaves, but the MUH takes up only the first 27, with the remaining leaves containing two apologetic Christian–Muslim dialogues (the dialogue of the patriarch and the caliph and the dialogue of al-kathūliqī and al-aʿrābī) and a collection of quotations from the Bible. At fourteen lines per page, the surviving fragmentary MUH contains about 750 lines of text.

In the 20th century, the Tunisian antiquarian Ḥasan Ḥusnī ʿAbd al-Wahhāb recognized the unusual nature of the manuscript and had it photographed. He sent the photographs to Giorgio Levi Della Vida. Today, they are kept in the Istituto per l'Oriente Carlo Alfonso Nallino. Levi Della Vida published the first study of the manuscript, focussing on the MUH, in 1962. He identified it as Mozarab in origin on the basis of the Latin marginalia, but relied on Cardinal Eugène Tisserant to date the manuscript to the late 1200s or early 1300s. The first edition of the text appeared in 1971, when his rough transcription and Italian translation of the text were edited and published by Maria Nallino after his death. Two further pages of the text were edited by Penelas in 2003. An attempted restoration in the 1980s reduced the legibility of the surviving pages.

== Bibliography ==
- Kassis, Hanna E. (2000). "The Mozarabs, Part II". In María Rosa Menocal; Raymond P. Scheindlin; Michael Sells (eds.). The Literature of Al-Andalus. Cambridge History of Arabic Literature. Vol. 4. Cambridge University Press. pp. 420–434. doi:10.1017/chol9780521471596.029.
- Levi Della Vida, Giorgio (1962). "Un texte mozarabe d'histoire universelle". Études d'orientalisme dédiées à la mémoire de Lévi-Provençal. Vol. 1. G.-P. Maisonneuve et Larose. pp. 175–183.
- Levi Della Vida, Giorgio (1971). "Un texte mozarabe d'histoire universelle". In Maria Nallino (ed.). Note di storia letteraria arabo-ispanica. Istituto per l'Oriente. pp. 123–192.
- Penelas, Mayte (2003). "Novedades sobre el Texto mozárabe de historia universal de Qayrawān". Collectanea Christiana Orientalia. 1: 143–161.
- Penelas, Mayte (2007). "Contents of an Apologetic Nature in Ms. Raqqada 2003/2 (formerly Great Mosque of Kairouan 120/829)". In Juan Pedro Monferrer-Sala (ed.). Eastern Crossroads: Essays on Medieval Christian Legacy. Gorgias Press. pp. 273–299.
- Penelas, Mayte (2012). "Brief Note on Some Precious Photographs Housed at the IPOCAN". Oriente Moderno. 92: 21–28. doi:10.1163/22138617-09201003.
- Penelas, Mayte (2014). "Un nuevo testimonio de la circulación de obras orientales de apologética cristiana en al-Andalus". Collectanea Christiana Orientalia. 11: 75–113.
- Penelas, Mayte (2020). "Canonical and Non-Canonical Sources for Biblical History in Two Arabic Universal Histories Written by Christians in al-Andalus". Medieval Encounters. 26 (4–5): 415–442. doi:10.1163/15700674-12340081.
- Roisse, Philippe (2003). "Redécouverte d'un important manuscrit 'arabe chrétien' occidental: le ms. Raqqāda 2003/2 (olim Kairouan 1220/829)". Collectanea Christiana Orientalia. 1: 279–285.
