= Dialogue of al-kathūliqī and al-aʿrābī =

The dialogue of al-kathūliqī and al-aʿrābī is an anonymous Arabic text depicting a fictitious debate between anonymous interlocutors, one Christian and one Muslim. It is a theological and apologetic text, and a rare survival from the literature of the Christians of al-Andalus. It was brought to scholarly attention by Giorgio Levi Della Vida.

The dialogue is preserved in a single manuscript copied about the year 1300 and once kept in the Great Mosque of Kairouan. Today it is MS 2003/2 in the National Museum of Islamic Art in Raqqāda. The manuscript is in poor condition and the text of the dialogue is only mostly complete. Much of it, however, is illegible. Nine of fourteen pages (seven leaves) are extant, but only about four pages of dialogue can be reconstructed. The manuscript also contains the Mozarabic Universal History, the Apology of Timothy the Patriarch before the Caliph Mahdi and a selection of biblical quotations. The dialogue of al-kathūliqī and al-aʿrābī has yet to be identified with any other known work.

The main purpose of the dialogue is to demonstrate by reason that God is a Trinity. The Christian, described as al-kathūliqī (the Catholic), poses challenges to his Muslim interlocutoar, described as al-aʿrābī (the Arab), with the intent of proving the truth of Christianity. The scholar Samir Khalil Samir suggested that kathūliqī might mean catholicos, but the spelling suggests Catholic. The basic argument is that knowledge (al-ʿilm) and will (al-irāda) are coeternal and consubstantial with God and can be identified with the Son and the Holy Ghost, respectively. The Christian argues for the distinctly Catholic doctrine of the double procession of the Holy Ghost.

== Bibliography ==
- Burman, Thomas E. (1994). Religious Polemic and the Intellectual History of the Mozarabs, c. 1050–1250. Brill.
- Levi Della Vida, Giorgio (1971). "Un texte mozarabe d'histoire universelle". In Maria Nallino (ed.). Note di storia letteraria arabo-ispanica. Istituto per l'Oriente. pp. 123–192.
- Penelas, Mayte (2007). "Contents of an Apologetic Nature in Ms. Raqqada 2003/2 (formerly Great Mosque of Kairouan 120/829)". In Juan Pedro Monferrer-Sala (ed.). Eastern Crossroads: Essays on Medieval Christian Legacy. Gorgias Press. pp. 273–299.
- Penelas, Mayte (2012). "Brief Note on Some Precious Photographs Housed at the IPOCAN". Oriente Moderno. 92: 21–28. doi:10.1163/22138617-09201003.
- Penelas, Mayte (2014). "Un nuevo testimonio de la circulación de obras orientales de apologética cristiana en al-Andalus". Collectanea Christiana Orientalia. 11: 75–113.
- Penelas, Mayte (2020). "Canonical and Non-Canonical Sources for Biblical History in Two Arabic Universal Histories Written by Christians in al-Andalus". Medieval Encounters. 26 (4–5): 415–442. doi:10.1163/15700674-12340081.
- Roisse, Philippe (2003). "Redécouverte d'un important manuscrit 'arabe chrétien' occidental: le ms. Raqqāda 2003/2 (olim Kairouan 1220/829)". Collectanea Christiana Orientalia. 1: 279–285.
- Shagrir, Iris (2019). The Parable of the Three Rings and the Idea of Religious Toleration in European Culture. Translated by Ilana Goldberg. Palgrave Macmillan.
