= Raqqāda 2003/2 =

A page from the Universal History in Raqqāda 2003/2 after restoration

Raqqāda 2003/2 is a manuscript containing four works of Mozarabic literature. It was probably copied in Spain around 1300. The three texts are in Arabic with a few marginal notes in Latin. The manuscript is in poor and fragmentary condition, with much of it being illegible.

The manuscript today consists of 50 leaves of paper, mounted since restoration on Japan paper. The original binding is lost and the leaves remain loose, being stored in a box. The pages are 200 by 160 millimetres (7.9 in × 6.3 in). The ink is heavily faded. The main text is in black with extensive rubrics in red ink. Both paper and ink are from a single source and the copying is the work of a single scribe. The writing is in Maghrebi script of the same style as used in al-Andalus. The page numbering, supplied in pencil, is modern. As the manuscript is unbound, the leaves were numbered haphazardly and there are thus two numbering in use, based on the pages themselves and their reconstructed actual order.

Today, the manuscript bears the shelfmark 2003/2 in the National Museum of Islamic Art in Raqqāda, Tunisia. As late as 1967, it was in the library of the Great Mosque of Kairouan. under shelfmark 1220/829. By the early 1980s, it had been transferred to the museum. Prior to its receiving the shelfmark, museum staff knew it as the Taʾrīkh Yarūnim. An attempted restoration in the 1980s further damaged it, reducing the legibility of the surviving pages.

In the mid-20th century, the Tunisian antiquarian Ḥasan Ḥusnī ʿAbd al-Wahhāb recognized the unusual nature of the manuscript and had it photographed. He sent the photographs to Giorgio Levi Della Vida. Today, they are kept in the Istituto per l'Oriente Carlo Alfonso Nallino. Levi Della Vida published the first study of the manuscript in 1962. He identified it as Mozarab in origin on the basis of the Latin marginalia, but relied on Cardinal Eugène Tisserant to date the manuscript to the late 1200s or early 1300s. Philippe Roisse has question both conclusions, suggesting that it could have been copied in the 11th century within the Christian community in Kairouan.

The four texts in Raqqāda 2003/2 are:

- Mozarabic Universal History – known only from this manuscript
- Apology of Timothy the Patriarch before the Caliph Mahdi – a translation known only from this manuscript
- Dialogue of al-kathūliqī and al-aʿrābī – known only from this manuscript
- Collection of biblical quotations mostly drawn from Psalms and the Prophets

== Bibliography ==
- Burman, Thomas E. (1994). Religious Polemic and the Intellectual History of the Mozarabs, c. 1050–1250. Brill.
- Penelas, Mayte (2007). "Contents of an Apologetic Nature in Ms. Raqqada 2003/2 (formerly Great Mosque of Kairouan 120/829)". In Juan Pedro Monferrer-Sala (ed.). Eastern Crossroads: Essays on Medieval Christian Legacy. Gorgias Press. pp. 273–299.
- Penelas, Mayte (2012). "Brief Note on Some Precious Photographs Housed at the IPOCAN". Oriente Moderno. 92: 21–28. doi:10.1163/22138617-09201003.
- Penelas, Mayte (2014). "Un nuevo testimonio de la circulación de obras orientales de apologética cristiana en al-Andalus". Collectanea Christiana Orientalia. 11: 75–113.
- Penelas, Mayte (2020). "Canonical and Non-Canonical Sources for Biblical History in Two Arabic Universal Histories Written by Christians in al-Andalus". Medieval Encounters. 26 (4–5): 415–442. doi:10.1163/15700674-12340081.
- Roisse, Philippe (2003). "Redécouverte d'un important manuscrit 'arabe chrétien' occidental: le ms. Raqqāda 2003/2 (olim Kairouan 1220/829)". Collectanea Christiana Orientalia. 1: 279–285.
