= Mozarabic literature =

Mozarabic Christian-Arabic writings

Mozarabic literature (or Mozarab literature) is the literature of the Mozarabs, Christians living under Islamic rule in Spain and their Arabized descendants. They produced literature in both Latin and Arabic.

== Latin ==
Among Latin works, historiography is especially important, since it constitutes the earliest record from al-Andalus of the conquest period. There are two main works from this period, the Chronicle of 741 and the Chronicle of 754. They derived their "literary style and erudite vocabulary" primarily from Isidore of Seville.

In the mid-ninth century, there was a reaction against Islamization and Arabization within the Mozarab community. One result of this movement was a flourishing of Latin letters within the city of Córdoba. Among writers with preserved works are Abbot Speraindeo and his disciples, Paul Albar and Eulogius of Córdoba, and, from the end of the century, Abbot Samson of Córdoba and Cyprian. Their writings, often letters, are primarily theological, apologetic and hagiographical. Albar wrote fourteen poems and Samson and Cyprian wrote epitaphs in verse. Samson engaged in a theological debate with Bishop Hostegesis. In addition, there are nineteen Latin hymns from this period, some of them perhaps written by the aforementioned authors.

After the ninth century, Latin literary production in al-Andalus practically ceases. In the twelfth-century, a Latin–Arabic glossary was compiled to help keep knowledge of Latin alive.

Besides literary works, Latin is also found on Mozarab tombstones.

== Arabic ==
=== Religious ===
Pages from a Mozarabic Psalter

Mozarabic literature in Arabic began in the latter half of the ninth century, after the Córdoban martyrs' movement (850–859). At the height of the martyrs' movement, Albar wrote a treatise in Latin, Indiculus luminosus, defending the martyrs and decrying the movement towards Arabic among his fellow Mozarabs. A generation later, Ḥafṣ ibn Albar al-Qūtī, finished a rhymed verse translation of the Psalms from the Latin Vulgate in 889. Although it survives in only one manuscript, it was a popular text and is quoted by Muslim and Jewish authors. Ḥafṣ also wrote a book of Christian answers to Muslim questions about their faith called The Book of the Fifty-Seven Questions. It is lost, but there are excerpts in the work of al-Qurṭubī, who praises Ḥafṣ' command of Arabic as the best among the Mozarabs. The eleventh-century writer Ibn Gabirol also quotes from a lost work of Ḥafṣ.

Several Arabic translations of the Bible were produced in al-Andalus in addition to Ḥafṣ's verse rendition of the Psalms. No single Arabic version became standard, as the liturgy continued to be in Latin. According to later sources, John of Seville made a translation in the ninth century, but it does not survive. From the tenth century, there is a surviving translations of the Gospels by Isḥāq ibn Bilashku and two prose translations of the Psalms. From the twelfth century, there are translations of the Epistle to the Galatians and the Epistle to the Laodiceans. Some authors quote from still other Arabic translations not otherwise known.

There is an Arabic collection of canon law known as the Sistemática mozárabe, compiled by a priest named Binjinsiyus for a bishop named al-Usquf ʿAbd al-Mālik. It is closely related to the Latin Collectio Hispana systematica, but it is not a translation. It contains numerous loanwords from ecclesiastical Latin, but its language is the most Islamicized and Quranic of any Mozarabic work.

After the fall of Toledo in 1085, a Mozarab priest under Christian rule wrote a treatise against Islam, Kitāb tathlīth al-waḥdāniyya ('The Threefold Nature of the Oneness'), addressed to the Muslims of Córdoba. It is lost, but is quoted extensively in a work by al-Qurṭubī intended to refute it. Another otherwise unknown work by a Mozarab author is cited by al-Khazrajī, but he may have fabricated "a hypothetical opponent in order to refute" him.

The manuscript Raqqāda 2003/2 contains a couple of apologetic works: a translation of the Syriac Apology of Timothy the Patriarch before the Caliph Mahdi and the otherwise unknown Dialogue of the Catholic and the Arab.

=== Other ===
At least two Christian Arabic works were commissioned by the Caliph al-Ḥakam II (r. 961–976): the Kitāb al-azmān, a liturgical calendar and almanac by ʿArīb ibn Saʿīd al-Qurṭūbī, and the Kitāb Hurūshiyūsh, a translation of Orosius' History Against the Pagans. The works commissioned by the caliph are of the highest quality among Mozarabic productions. A history of the Franks by Bishop Gotmar III of Girona was presented to al-Ḥakam probably in 940. It is not extant and is known only through a citation by al-Masʿūdī, who saw a copy in Egypt in 947–948. Another work of Mozarabic historiography, the so-called Mozarabic Universal History, is known from a single manuscript from about 1300, the Raqqāda 2003/2. Its beginning is lost and it ends with the Arab conquest. It contains Latin glosses in the margins.

Very little Mozarabic poetry survives. A few lines of the poet Ibn al-Mirʿizzī al-Naṣrānī, who was active in the court of al-Muʿtamid of Seville (r. 1069–1091), are quoted by Ibn Saʿīd and al-Maqqarī.

Several Mozarabic translations into Arabic are known but lost. Ibn Juljul cites two translations from Latin: the Kitāb al-quruwāniqa, a translation of Jerome's Chronica, and a translation of Isidore's Etymologiae. The Sistemática mozárabe makes reference to an otherwise unknown translation of a Greek work by Eunomius.

== Bibliography ==
- Burman, Thomas E. (1994). Religious Polemic and the Intellectual History of the Mozarabs, c. 1050–1200. E. J. Brill.
- Chalmeta, Pedro (1993). "Mozarabs". In Bosworth, C. E.; van Donzel, E.; Heinrichs, W. P. & Pellat, Ch. (eds.). The Encyclopaedia of Islam, Second Edition. Volume VII: Mif–Naz. Leiden: E. J. Brill. pp. 246–249. ISBN 978-90-04-09419-2.
- Christys, Ann (2002). Christians in al-Andalus (711–1000). Routledge.
- Collins, Roger (2012). Caliphs and Kings: Spain, 796–1031. London: Wiley Blackwell.
- Donoso Jiménez, Isaac (2007). "Literatura latina mozárabe" (PDF). Cuaderno Internacional de Estudios Humanísticos y Literatura. 8: 8–39.
- Gil, Juan, ed. (2020) [1973]. Scriptores Muzarabici saeculi VIII–XI. Vol. 1–2. Brepols.
- Goussen, Heinrich (2018) [1909]. The Christian-Arabic Literature of the Mozarabs [Die christlich-arabische Literatur der Mozaraber]. Translated by Juan Pedro Monferrer Sala. Traugott Bautz.
- Hitchcock, Richard (2008). Mozarabs in Medieval and Early Modern Spain: Identities and Influences. Ashgate.
- Kassis, Hanna E. (2000). "The Mozarabs, Part II". In María Rosa Menocal; Raymond P. Scheindlin; Michael Sells (eds.). The Literature of Al-Andalus. Cambridge History of Arabic Literature. Vol. 4. Cambridge University Press. pp. 420–434. doi:10.1017/chol9780521471596.029.
- Koningsveld, Pieter Sjoerd van (1977). The Latin–Arabic Glossary of the Leiden University Library: A Contribution to the Study of Mozarabic Manuscripts and Literature. New Rhine Publishers.
- Koningsveld, Pieter Sjoerd van (1994). "Christian Arabic Literature from Medieval Spain: An Attempt at Periodization". In Samir Khalil Samir; Jorgen S. Nielsen (eds.). Christian Arabic Apologetics during the Abbasid Period (750–1258). E. J. Brill.
- Miller, H. D. (2000). "The Mozarabs, Part I". In María Rosa Menocal; Raymond P. Scheindlin; Michael Sells (eds.). The Literature of Al-Andalus. Cambridge History of Arabic Literature. Vol. 4. Cambridge University Press. pp. 418–420. doi:10.1017/chol9780521471596.029.
- Penelas, Mayte (2020). "Canonical and Non-Canonical Sources for Biblical History in Two Arabic Universal Histories Written by Christians in al-Andalus". Medieval Encounters. 26 (4–5): 415–442. doi:10.1163/15700674-12340081. hdl:10261/344039.
- Pérez González, Carlos (2024). "Spain". In Francesco Stella; Lucie Doležalová; Danuta Shanzer (eds.). Latin Literatures of Medieval and Early Modern Times in Europe and Beyond: A Millennium Heritage. John Benjamins. pp. 135–157.
- Roisse, Philippe (2003). "Redécouverte d'un important manuscrit 'arabe chrétien' occidental: le ms. Raqqāda 2003/2 (olim Kairouan 1220/829)". Collectanea Christiana Orientalia. 1: 279–285.
