= Georg Graf =

German Orientalist (1875–1955)

- Born: 15 March 1875; Münsingen, Germany
- Died: 18 September 1955 (aged 80); Dillingen an der Donau, Germany
- Occupations: German Author, Orientalist,
- Notable work: Geschichte der christlichen arabischen Literatur

Georg Graf (15 March 1875 – 18 September 1955) was a German Orientalist. One of the most important scholars of Christian-Arabic literature, his 5-volume Geschichte der christlichen arabischen Literatur is the foundational text in the field.

== Life ==
Georg Graf was born in Münsingen, Germany, in 1875. He entered the seminary of Dillingen, where he studied Greek, Latin and Hebrew, while privately he also studied Syriac and Arabic. From 1902 to 1903, he completed his studies at the Ludwig-Maximilians-Universität München, studying ancient Egyptian, Coptic, modern Greek and later Georgian. In 1903, he obtained a doctorate of philology with his thesis on Arabic-Christian literature up to the 11th century, which was published in 1905. This brought him to the attention of the founder of the journal al-Machriq, Louis Cheikhô, for whom Graf held a high regard. From 1910 to 1911, he studied Christian literature at monasteries, while living in Jerusalem. He also visited Beirut for a short stay.

In 1918 Graf obtained a doctorate of theology from the University of Freiburg with a monograph on Marqus Ibn al-Qunbar (Ein Reformversuch innerhalb der Koptischen Kirche im zwölften Jahrhundert), published in 1923. Further research visits to Egypt, Syria and Palestine followed. In 1930, he was named Honorary Professor for Christian Oriental literature at the theology faculty of the Ludwig-Maximilians-Universität München. In 1946, he was appointed a papal chaplain. He died in Dillingen an der Donau in 1955. The tennis star Steffi Graf is a distant relative.

== Legacy ==
Graf's Nachlass, (collected documents) is housed in Munich. The Centre for Christian Arabic Literature and Research in Beirut CEDRAC continues his work in the field of research.

== Geschichte der christlichen arabischen Literatur ==
- Geschichte der christlichen arabischen Literatur ('History of Christian Arabic Literature'); abbrev. GCAL. (5 vols., Vatican City, 1944–53). Graf's magnum opus covers all Arabic Christian literature up to the end of the 19th century and completes Carl Brockelmann's Geschichte der arabischen Literatur ('History of Arabic Literature') (1908-1912) for which it was conceived as a complementary work.

Five Volumes; 2,384 pages.

- Vol. 1 translations into Arabic, including the bible.
- Vol. 2 Authors (up to the mid-15th century).
- Vol. 3 Authors (mid-15th century - late-19th century); includes the Melkites and Maronites.
- Vol. 4 Authors; includes Coptic, Jacobite, Nestorian, and Armenian authors.
- Vol. 5 Index.

Literary encyclopedia of Arab-Christian authors, with related biographic and bibliographic material, summary of their works, editions, translations and studies, and index to the manuscripts sources. Many works listed remain unpublished and untranslated.

== Other works ==
Graf published over 270 books, articles and essays on the Christian orient. At the time much of the literature in Arabic remained unpublished. He was a long-term contributor to the Arabic series of the Corpus Scriptorum Christianorum Orientalium and the journal Oriens Christianus.

He translated a number of Arabic texts into German, including the works of Theodore Abu-Qurrah.

== Bibliography ==
- Geschichte der christlichen arabischen Literatur. Città del Vaticano, Bibliotheca Apostolica Vaticana, 1944-1953. 5 vols.
- Die christlich-arabische Literatur: bis zur fränkischen Zeit (Ende des 11. Jahrhunderts); eine literarhistorische Skizze, Freiburg im Breisgau, Herder 1905. - X, 74 S. (Strassburger theologische Studien; 7,1)
- Catalogue de manuscrits arabes chrétiens conservés au Caire. Città del Vaticano: Biblioteca apostolica vaticana, 1934.
- Die arabischen Schriften des Theodor Abu Qurra, Bischofs von Harran (ca. 740-820 Forschungen zur christlichen Literatur- und Dogmengeschichte, Band X, Heft 3/4, Paderborn, 1910.
- Des Theodor Abu Kurra Traktat uber den Schopfer und die wahre Religion, Beitrage zur Geschichte der Philosophie des Mittelalters. Texte und Untersuchungen, Band XIV, Heft 1. Munster, Westphalia, 1913. Contains German translation.

== Literature ==
- Friedrich Wilhelm Bautz (1990). "Georg Graf". In Bautz, Friedrich Wilhelm (ed.). Biographisch-Bibliographisches Kirchenlexikon (BBKL) (in German). Vol. 2. Hamm: Bautz. col. 282. ISBN 3-88309-032-8.
- Samir Khalil Samir: Georg Graf (1875–1955), sa bibliographie et son rôle dans le renouveau des études arabes chrétiennes, in: Oriens Christianus 84 (2000) 77-100.
- Peter Tarras: "A Note on Georg Graf's Nachlass". Biblia Arabica Blog. Retrieved 2018-12-04.
- A related title, which supplements the entries on Maronites, is Michael Breydey, Geschichte der syro-arabischen Literatur der Maroniten vom VII. bis XVI. Jahrhundert. Oplanden, Westdeutscher Verlag, 1985.
