= Apology of Timothy the Patriarch before the Caliph Mahdi =

14th-century copy of an Arabic recension

The Apology of Timothy the Patriarch before the Caliph Mahdi or the Disputation with the Caliph al-Mahdī, also called Letter 59, is a Syriac text written by the Patriarch Timothy I of Seleucia-Ctesiphon in 782/783. It is a letter containing Timothy's own account in dialogue form of a conversation on Christianity and Islam he carried on over two days with the Abbasid caliph al-Mahdī (r. 775–785). The main issue disputed was whether God is a Trinity or a unity.

The original conversation took place in Arabic and the Apology was several times translated into Arabic. It was a relatively popular text among Arabic-speaking Christians, being copied from Mesopotamia to Spain. The earliest surviving manuscript is a framgent of a copy of an Arabic translation found in the Cairo Genizah, dating to around 1100. The oldest Syriac copy is from around 1300. In the late 19th century, a shortened recension of the Syriac text appeared. The Arabic translations are also frequently reworked, giving rise to Melkite and Mozarabic versions.

== Description ==
=== Frame letter ===
In the oldest manuscript, the text is introduced with the following words:

Tub dilēh kad dīlēh d-mār Ṭīmātēʾōs qāṭōlīqā drāshā da-ʿbad lwāt Mahdī ʾamīrā da-mhaymānē b-sharbā d-haymānūtā da-kresṭyānūtā ba-znā d-shūʾālā wa-dpūnāy petgāmā

And now the disputation of the same Catholicos Mār Timothy with Mahdī, the Commander of the Faithful, about Christianity in the form of question and answer.

It is a record in Syriac of a conversation in Arabic that took place in Baghdad over two days between the Patriarch Timothy and the Caliph al-Mahdī. It is in the form of a letter by the patriarch to a friend in which he recounts the conversation from memory in dialogue format. The friend, Sergius, was the schoolmaster of Mar Gabriel and Mar Abraham monasteries, and later the metropolitan of Elam. Although structured as a letter, it is mainly a "theological treatise in the form of a dialogue" with only the barest epistolary framing.

=== Debate ===
The main topics discussed are the nature of God (i.e., Christology, dyophysitism and the Trinity) and salvation history (i.e., the nature of Muḥammad's witness). Lesser topics include circumcision, the direction of prayer and the internal consistency of the Bible. The discussion begins with the caliph's objection: "It is not right for a man like you, O Catholicos, who possesses such knowledge as this and such reasoning about God, ever to say about God that He took a wife and begat from her a son."

The common ground of the debate is the appeal to sacred texts. Both the patriarch and the caliph accept the authority of the Torah, the Gospels and the Qurʾān, albeit with caveats. For the caliph, the Torah and Gospels are divine revelation that have been corrupted. Timothy counters that Jews and Christians agree on the text of the Torah, while it is hardly possible that they conspired falsify it.

For the patriarch, the Qurʾān is not revelation but a work of theology that can be used to support Trinitarian doctrine. He argues, for example, that the three letters (muqaṭṭaʿāt) that occur before certain sūras are "vestiges of the Trinity". For the caliph, Muḥammad is the Paraclete (comforter) promised by Jesus in the Gospel of John, as well as the prophet promised in Deuteronomy 18:18 and the rider on the camel in Isaiah 21:6–9. For Timothy, "Muḥammad deserves praise from all rational people" because he preached monotheism and led his people out of idolatry.

The caliph, objecting to the Christian belief that Christ was God, asks if Christ wished to be crucified. If he did, then his killers were merely doing the will of God and are to be praised. If he was crucified against his will, he cannot be omnipotent. The same objection from Muslims is also answered by John of Damascus and Theodore Abū Qurra. Timothy answers that Christ's will was like that of the mutaṭawwiʿa, warriors who voluntarily fight for God's cause. To the caliph's objection that Christ's being a servant is incompatible with his being God, Timothy answers that al-Mahdī's son, Hārūn al-Rashīd, is no less free just because he is serving in the army.

In an unusual passage, perhaps as an "extreme political concession", Timothy condemns the caliph's Christian enemies, the Roman Empire resisting the westward advance of Islam. As a subject of the caliph, albeit exempted from the poll tax, he was not completely free to speak his mind. The caliph is unimpressed by Timothy's analogies for the Trinity, such as likening it to sun, light and heat. The dialogue ends with a discussion of Timothy's parable of the pearl, in which the truth is likened to a pearl that is dropped in a house at night. Everyone thinks he has found it but the dawn—the Last Judgment in which both interlocutors believe—will reveal who truly possesses it and who has mistakenly grabbed a stone or a bit of glass. The debate thus ends without resolution.

== Historicity ==
Although doubts about the authenticity of the account have sometimes been raised, there are good reasons to accept it. Timothy mentions audiences with the caliph in other letters and Islamic sources record that religious disputations between Muslims were often held before al-Mahdī. Heimgartner, the most recent editor of the text, adduces internal evidence for the ebb and flow of a dialogue taking place over two days. Writing that "the authenticity of the Disputation is certain", he notes that it lacks the hallmarks of fictitious dialogues of the apologetic type and leaves the caliph, who is often "portrayed as cleverer than the patriarch", unpersuaded. The patriarch, however, has far more lines than the caliph.

Even if the debate between the patriarch and the caliph took place, the account of it was produced after the fact by one side. It needs to be regarded, according to Robert Hoyland, following the opinion of François Nau, as "a literary construction rather than a faithful transcription" of a historical conversation. David Wilmshurst regards the work as a fictional dialogue in a realistic setting. The discussion could have taken place but probably did not. He considers Timothy's purpose as being to give "a model of how Muslims and Christians should discuss their differences with one another", resulting in what is "easily the best specimen of the literature of debate between Christians and Muslims."

== Date ==
The conversation behind the Apology must have taken place after Timothy became patriarch in 780 and before the death of al-Mahdī. Alphonse Mingana dates it more precisely on the basis of these words of the patriarch:

Hārūn ... now called by everybody 'Heir Presumptive' ... served his military service through the mission entrusted to him by your Majesty to repair to Constantinople against the rebellious and tyrannical Byzantines. Through this service and mission he will not lose.

This expedition was the Abbasid invasion of Asia Minor. The wording suggests that Hārūn al-Rashīd had left on campaign but had not yet returned at the time of the second day of conversation. Minagana places this campaign in 781. Martin Heimgartner, on the other hand, puts the debate in 782/783, arguing that it must have been taken place after Hārūn was named second in line to the throne after his brother al-Hādī. The letter was written not long after the debate.

== Recensions and manuscripts ==
=== Syriac ===
The original text is the Syriac long recension. There is also a Syriac short recension.

The oldest extant Syriac copy of the Apology is found in manuscript 509 of the Library of the Chaldean Monastery in Baghdad, formerly manuscript 169 in the Monastery of Our Lady of the Seeds, Alqosh. Copied in 1299, it contains a collection of documents compiled under Patriarch Eliya I (r. 1028–1040). Two elements of the collection are by Timothy: his lawbook, Ṭaksē d-dēne ʿtānāye wad-yārtāwaṯā, and his 59 letters to Sergius, including the long recension of the Apology as letter 59.

All other extant manuscripts of the Syriac long recension descend from MS 509. There are six direct copies made between the 1860s and 1932. One of these, Baghdad 512, has itself been copied twice. The Syriac short recension is known from a single manuscript of 1889.

Mingana first printed the Syriac text in the form of a facsimile of MS 19 in the Mingana Collection with an accompanying English translation. Heimgartner published an improved edition based on the oldest manuscript in 2011, alongside a German translation. It is now the standard edition for reference.

=== Arabic ===
The Apology was popular among Arabic-speaking Christians. An Arabic translation may have existed as early ast the 9th century, since it seems to be quoted in the East Syriac version of the Debate of the Monk Ibrāhīm al-Ṭabarānī. It was also cited by Dionysios bar Ṣalibi. At least six separate Arabic recensions are known. These are not mere translations because they frequently alter the text for their own purposes. All of them are shorter than the original, being limited to the first day of the disputation. These recensions are:

- A I – the recension most faithful to the Syriac, known from a 14th-century Egyptian manuscript, now Paris, Bibliothèque national de France, Arabe 82, edited and translated into French by Robert Caspar in 1977 and translated into Spanish by Francisco del Río in 1998
- A II – a "very unfaithful" recension preserved in Paris, Bibliothèque national de France, Arabe 215, a 16th-century manuscript from Egypt, portrays the caliph as a "naive admirer" of the patriarch and aims to demonstrate the superiority of Christianity rather than to provide a rational defence of it; has never been edited
- A III – a late 19th-century recension known from Beirut, Bibliothèque orientale, MS 662, possibly the autograph manuscript, originally from Mosul, edited first by Louis Cheikho in 1921 and later by Hans Putnam and Samir Khalil Samir in 1973, who also translated it into French
- A IV – a 16th-century recension intended for a Melkite audience, in which Timothy and al-Mahdī are replaced by the Melkite Theodore Abū Qurra and his contemporary, Caliph al-Maʾmūn; has never been edited

In addition to these four Arabic recensions, the earliest manuscript of the Apology in any language is a two-leaf fragment of an Arabic translation found in the Cairo Genizah, dated to about 1100. It is closer to the Syriac than A I but is otherwise similar and "the translator (or editor) of [A I] probably knew the previous recension, fragmentarily extant today" in the Genizah. The Apology also circulated in al-Andalus. A Mozarabic version is known only from a fragmentary text in the manuscript 2003/2 of the National Museum of Islamic Art in Raqqāda, formerly of the Great Mosque of Kairouan. This manuscript was is generally thought to have been copied in Spain around 1300, although Philippe Roisse argues that it could hve been copied in Kairouan in the 11th century, which would make it earlier than the Cairo copy. The Mozarabic version is independent of the other Arabic recensions.

The Arabic title Al-Muḥāwarah al-dīnīyah has been used for the Apology.

== Bibliography ==
=== Editions ===
- Heimgartner, Martin, ed. (2011). Timotheos I., Ostsyrischer Patriarch: Disputation mit dem Kalifen al-Mahdi. Peeters.
- Mingana, Alphonse (1928). "Apology of Timothy the Patriarch before the Caliph Mahdi". Bulletin of the John Rylands Library. 12: 147–298.
- Samir, Samir Khalil; Nasry, Wafik, eds. (2018). The Patriarch and the Caliph: An Eighth-Century Dialogue between Timothy I and al-Mahdi. Brigham Young University Press.

=== Secondary literature ===
- Berti, Vittorio (2012). "Review of Heimgartner 2011". Hugoye. 15 (1): 173–176.
- Brock, Sebastian P. (2012). "Review of Heimgartner 2011". The Journal of Ecclesiastical History. 63 (2): 367–368. doi:10.1017/S0022U911002983.
- Burman, Thomas E. (1994). Religious Polemic and the Intellectual History of the Mozarabs, c. 1050–1250. Brill.
- Caspar, Robert (1977). "Les versions arabes du dialogue entre le Catholicos Timothée I et le Calife al-Mahdî (II^{e}/VIII^{e} siècle): 'Mohammed a suivi la voie des prophètes'". Islamochristiana. 3: 107–175.
- Harris, Rendel (1928). "Apology of Timothy the Patriarch before the Caliph Mahdi: Introduction". Bulletin of the John Rylands Library. 12: 137–146.
- Heimgartner, Martin (2010). "Letter 59 (Disputation with the Caliph al-Mahdī)". In D. Thomas (ed.). Christian–Muslim Relations Online. Brill. doi:10.1163/1877-8054_cmri_COM_23626.
- Hoyland, Robert G. (1997). Seeing Islam as Others Saw It: A Survey and Evaluation of Christian, Jewish and Zoroastrian Writings on Early Islam. Darwin Press.
- Jullien, Christelle (2013). "Review of Heimgartner 2011". Abstracta Iranica. 32–33 (33). doi:10.4000/abstractairanica.40833.
- Penelas, Mayte (2007). "Contents of an Apologetic Nature in Ms. Raqqada 2003/2 (formerly Great Mosque of Kairouan 120/829)". In Juan Pedro Monferrer-Sala (ed.). Eastern Crossroads: Essays on Medieval Christian Legacy. Gorgias Press. pp. 273–299.
- Penelas, Mayte (2014). "Un nuevo testimonio de la circulación de obras orientales de apologética cristiana en al-Andalus". Collectanea Christiana Orientalia. 11: 75–113.
- Roisse, Philippe (2003). "Redécouverte d'un important manuscrit 'arabe chrétien' occidental: le ms. Raqqāda 2003/2 (olim Kairouan 1220/829)". Collectanea Christiana Orientalia. 1: 279–285.
- Samir, Samir Khalil; Nasry, Wafik (2018). "Introduction". The Patriarch and the Caliph: An Eighth-Century Dialogue between Timothy I and al-Mahdi. Brigham Young University Press. pp. xx–xlix.
- Schall, James V. (2018). "Preface: Dialogues without Resolution". The Patriarch and the Caliph: An Eighth-Century Dialogue between Timothy I and al-Mahdi. Brigham Young University Press. pp. xi–xvii.
- Shagrir, Iris (2019). The Parable of the Three Rings and the Idea of Religious Toleration in European Culture. Translated by Ilana Goldberg. Palgrave Macmillan.
- Szilágyi, Krisztina (2006). "Christian Books in Jewish Libraries: Fragments of Christian Arabic Writings from the Cairo Genizah". Ginzei Qedem. 2: 107*–162*.
- Wilmshurst, David (2011). The Martyred Church: A History of the Church of the East. East and West Publishing.
