= Mozarabic =

Mozarabic may refer to:

- Andalusi Romance, also called the Mozarabic language
- Mozarabs, the Arabized Christians of the medieval Iberian Peninsula
  - Mozarabic art and architecture
  - Mozarabic chant
  - Mozarabic literature
  - Mozarabic Rite
