= Allāhumma =

Vocative form of Allah, the Islamic and Arabic term for the God

In Islam, Allāhumma (Arabic: ٱللَّٰهُمَّ), is an Arabic term of address for Allah. The word is similar to the word Elohim but do not have the same meaning. Allah is the word Ilah ("God") with the addition of Al- ("The"), Ilah already derived from the singular form of Elohim, ''Eloh'' (Hebrew: אֱלֹהִ, romanized: ʾĔlōh).

It is translated as "O Allāh" and is seen as the equivalent of "Yā Allāh". Some grammarians—such as Sibawayh—argue that it is an abbreviation of yā ʾallāhu ʾummanā bi-khayr (يا ألله أمّنا بخير) with the meaning of ("O God, lead us in goodness"); others have argued that the suffix -mma (ـ مَّ) takes the place of yā (''O'').

== Christian usage ==
Hafs ibn Albar, a 9th–10th century Christian Visigothic author in al-Andalus, translated the Biblical Psalms into Arabic. Rather than using the standard word for God, "Allah", he used Allahumma.

== See also ==
- Glossary of Islam
- Outline of Islam
- List of Islamic terms in Arabic
- Dua Allahumma kun li-waliyyik
- Elohim
