= Al-Bashir (magazine) =

Arabic Catholic magazine in Lebanon (1870–1947)

- Editor: Louis Cheikho; Henri Lammens; Lahad Khater
- Categories: Catholic magazine
- Frequency: Triweekly
- Publisher: Jesuits
- Founder: Ambroise Monnot, S.J.
- Founded: 1870
- First issue: January 1870
- Final issue: 1947
- Country: Ottoman Syria
- Based in: Beirut
- Language: Arabic

Al-Bashir (Arabic: البشير ALA-LC: Al-Bashīr 'The Messenger') was a Catholic magazine published in Beirut (modern-day Lebanon), by the Jesuits. It was published triweekly from 1870 to 1947 and supported the Catholic religious cause in the region.

== History and profile ==
It was launched by Ambroise Monnot, S.J. in Beirut with the name Concile du Vatican in 1870 as an eight-page weekly Arabic publication. The founding objective was to protect the Vatican Council (1869–1870) from the harsh criticisms exerted by the Protestant journals published in Beirut. In 1871 the publication was renamed as Al-Bashir and became a comprehensive journal. In the early period the editor was Father Louis Cheikho who later founded and edited another Jesuit magazine, Al-Machriq. Al-Bashir was a supporter of the Decentralization Party.

The rival of Al-Bashir was Al-Muqtataf, and there were frequent hot debates between them concerning various topics. One of these debates took place in 1883 when Al-Muqtataf published articles about the evolution-related views developed by Charles Darwin. The most serious attacks came from the editor of Al-Bashir, Cheikho, who argued that Darwin's ideas were totally absurd. The editors of Al-Muqtataf who were Protestants were accused of being atheists by Al-Bashir. The accusations of the editors and contributors of two journals lasted until 1884, and the incident became known not only in the region but also in Europe. The problem was solved the same year only through the intervention of the Ottomans who asked the editors through the Directorate of Foreign Affairs and Publications in Beirut to stop accusing each other if they did not want to be subject to the bans or penalty. Partly due to this event the journal was censored by the Ottoman in Constantinople.

In 1888 the journal was given a certificate of honor and a silver medal from the Roman jubilee committee of Pope Leo XIII. A Belgian-born Jesuit and Orientalist Henri Lammens was one of the editors, and Philippe Cuche, an Arabic writer, was among the contributors and directors of the journal. Lammens served in the post twice, briefly in 1894 and then from 1900 to 1903.

Al-Bashir ceased publication in 1914. The paper reemerged in 1924 and was again published by the Jesuit under the editorship of Lahad Khater. It was one of the critics of Antoun Saadeh's Syrian Social Nationalist Party (SSNP) in the late 1930s. For Al-Bashir the SSNP was financed by Italy and Germany which were ruled by the Fascist parties and was attempting to create internal troubles in Lebanon and in Syria. Al-Bashir was in circulation until 1947 when it was permanently closed.
