= Lahad Khater =

Lebanese educator, historian, journalist and writer (1881–1975)

- Born: 1 March 1881; Rwayset el Naamen, Aley District, Ottoman Lebanon
- Died: 1975 (aged 93–94)
- Occupations: Historian; Writer; Journalist

Lahad Khater (1881–1975) was a Lebanese educator, historian, journalist and writer. He was the editor of a Jesuit publication entitled Al-Bashir between 1924 and 1947.

== Biography ==
Khater was born in Rwayset el Naamen, a village in Aley district, on 1 March 1881. Following his graduation from Al Hikme high school in Beirut he began to work as a teacher. Later he joined Saint Joseph University and Al Farir College. He established a school in his village where he was a teacher.

In 1924, Khater became the editor of Al-Bashir which he held until 1947 when the magazine folded. He published many books most of which were about the history of Lebanon. His book Ahd al-mutasarrifîn fi Lubnân 1861–1918 which was published in Beirut in 1967 is about the major political events in Lebanon in the period between 1861 and 1918. He died in 1975.
