= CEDRAC =

Research and documentation center for Arabic Christianity

CEDRAC (French: Centre de documentation et de recherches arabes chrétiennes) is the Center for Arab Christian Research and Documentation of Saint Joseph University of Beirut (USJ). It was established in 1991 by Fr. Samir Khalil Samir. It was incorporated in 1996 into the USJ.

The CEDRAC sees itself as following in the tradition of the researchers Louis Cheikhô and Georg Graf who worked in this discipline in Beirut at the end of the 19th and start of the 20th century.

The center holds some 23,000 books and multimedia items. The disciplines studied are history, philosophy, philology, and religion: Christianity, Islam and other religions of the region such as Judaism and Zoroastrianism with a focus on Lebanon, Syria, Iraq, Iran, Palestine, and Egypt. The literature is in several languages and comprises documents about these religions from their origin to the present day. Moreover, it organises seminars and conferences and prepares and publishes various publications.
