= Carolina Sanín =

Colombian writer (born 1973)

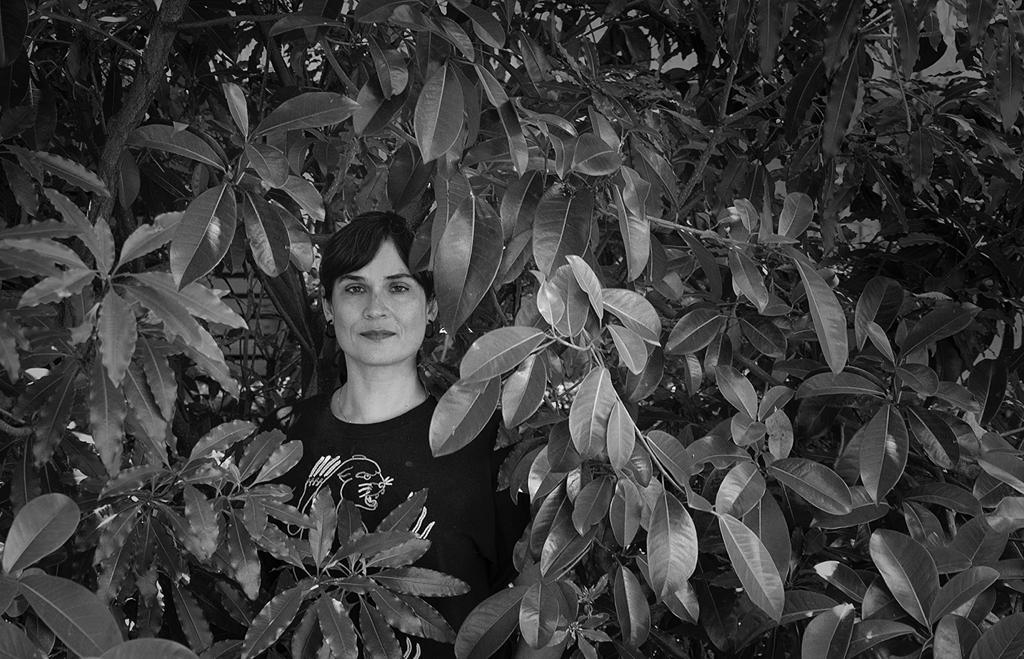
- Born: April 28, 1973 (age 53); Bogotá, Colombia
- Education: University of Los Andes; Yale University
- Occupations: Writer, professor
- Writing career
- Notable works: Tu cruz en el cielo desierto, Somos luces abismales, Los niños
- Website: www.carolinasanin.com

Carolina Sanín Paz (born April 28, 1973) is a Colombian writer who also holds Spanish citizenship. She has published novels, essays, short stories, and children's books. She has been a professor at SUNY Purchase in the United States, and at University of Los Andes and National University of Colombia in Colombia. She has also worked as a translator, as a television host, and as a film actress. She has contributed periodical columns to several Colombian and international newspapers and magazines.

== Early life and education ==
Sanín was born in Bogotá, Colombia. She grew up in Bogotá, Medellín, and Cartagena de Indias. She studied philosophy and literature at the University of Los Andes in Bogotá, and in 2003 she received a PhD in Spanish and Portuguese Literature from Yale University, where she worked with María Rosa Menocal and wrote a dissertation on collections of medieval framed stories.

== Career ==
She lived in Barcelona for seven years, and there she worked as a translator and as a reader for several publishing houses. From 2005 to 2010, she was a professor at SUNY Purchase, and from 2010 to 2016, at the University of Los Andes. She has also taught courses at the National University of Colombia and the Technological University of Pereira. She currently teaches creative writing workshops and independent literature courses in association with the Librería Lerner in Bogotá.

Since 2005, she has published three novels, a collection of short stories, two humor books, two children's books, two essays, a hybrid genre book, a critical anthology, and a collection of her columns.

In 2019, she starred in Franco Lolli's film Litigante, which opened the Critics' Week at Cannes. Since 2020, she hosts Dominio Público, a talk show aired on Canal Capital.

== Reception and influence ==
Sanín's literary work has been praised by writers and critics in the Spanish-speaking world. Sanín's novel The Children has been translated to English and Italian, and two of her most recent books, Somos luces abismales and Tu cruz en el cielo desierto, are soon to be published in English in the United Kingdom by Charco Press. Her children's book La gata sola was included in the White Ravens catalog of 2018.

Her books, her public lectures, her work in newspapers, magazines, and television, as well as her activity in social media, have made her an influential figure in the Colombian public debate. In 2018, she became a vocal supporter of leftist presidential candidate Gustavo Petro, who lost in the elections to rightist Iván Duque. She has written widely read and discussed op-ed pieces on Colombian politicians such as Antanas Mockus, Álvaro Uribe, and Claudia López.

== Controversies ==
Sanín has been in the spotlight of several controversies. In 2016, after criticizing the University of Los Andes for its response to her treatment on social media and other institutional policies, she was fired. A judge ordered that Sanín be reinstated in her position, arguing that her fundamental rights had been violated, but the university appealed, and a second ruling favored Los Andes, to the dismay of some.

In 2017, she published a column on Vice about trans identities and the "sex-based" nature of the oppression of women, in which, according to critics from feminist and trans movements, she subscribed to trans-exclusionary radical feminist views. Her column was subsequently criticized in several publications as “transphobic.” More recently, in 2021, Sanín was accused on Twitter of encouraging people to use illegal drugs after she interviewed a drug liberalization activist in the talk show that she hosts for Canal Capital.

== Works ==
=== Novels ===
- 2005: Todo en otra parte
- 2014: Los niños
- 2020: Tu cruz en el cielo desierto

=== Short fiction ===
- 2010: Ponqué y otros cuentos

=== Essays ===
- 2009: Alfonso X
- 2019: El ojo de la casa
- 2025: La voz del buey

=== Poetry ===
- 2021: Nueve noches para la Navidad
- 2024: El libro que imaginas (Illustrated by Santiago Guevara)

=== Hybrid genre ===
- 2018: Somos luces abismales
- 2022: El sol

=== Humor ===
- 2013: Yosoyu.
- 2017: Alto rendimiento

=== Anthologies ===
- 2015: Pasajes de Fernando González
- 2020: Pasar fijándose

=== Children's books ===
- 2010: Dalia
- 2018: La gata sola

=== Television ===
Year	Title	Role	Notes
2019	Litigante	Silvia Paz	
2021	Mesa Capital: Dominio Público	Herself (Hostess)	
