= Mutaṭawwiʿa =

Mutaṭawwiʿa (or muṭṭawwiʿa, singular mutaṭawwiʿ) is an Arabic term meaning "those who perform supererogatory deeds of piety", that is, more than what is required by Sharīʿa. It is derived from the verb taṭawwaʿa as used in the Qurʾān (2:158, 2:184, 9:79). It often refers to volunteer soldiers who, in the words of al-Samʿānī, "go beyond the call of duty in ghazw". They are associated with holy war (jihād), the ribāṭ and the frontier (thaghr).

== Origins and asceticism ==
The Umayyad army and the subsequent Abbasid army depended on paid troops, but they also included volunteers who were entitled to a share of booty (ghanīma). These would sometimes return a portion of their share of booty as tanāhud. Some volunteers served out of religious zeal or a desire to die a martyr (shahīd). They were most common along the frontier of the Islamic world. They came mainly from Khorasan, were strongly Sunnī and practised asceticism.

The mutaṭawwiʿ ʿAbd Allāh ibn al-Mubārak transmitted a hadith that Muḥammad said, "The rahbāniyya [monasticism] of my community is jihād." Some mutaṭawwiʿa, like Ibrāhīm ibn Adham al-Balkhī, renounced sex and marriage, although this was a marginal practice and often condemned. Most mutaṭawwiʿa were married and sexual pleasure was the expected reward for warrior asceticism both in this life and the next. Ibn al-Mubārak claims that the houris descend on warriors who died in battle at the very moment of death.

== Rise and fall ==
Large contingents of such volunteers from Yemen joined the army of ʿUbayd Allāh ibn Abī Bakra when it marched against the Zunbīls in 698. Likewise, large contingents of volunteers participated in Yazīd ibn al-Muhallab's campaign in Tabaristan and Gorgan in 716–717. Mutaṭawwiʿa were attracted in large numbers to the early Ghaznavid campaigns in India. Such contingents could sometimes be a liability. Since they were free to go, they could prove unreliable over a long campaign. Likewise, they were often unruly, unpredictable and unamenable to military discipline. The ʿayyārūn were bands of volunteers, often operating independently and frequently against internal enemies considered heterodox. The Saffarid dynasty had its origin among such groups.

The high point of mutaṭawwiʿ activity was in the later 8th century and the 9th century, when "the caliphate was ceasing to fight the infidel as systematically as it had done" during Islam's first century. In the late 8th century, the Christian patriarch Timothy I in his Disputation with the Caliph al-Mahdī compared the willingness of Jesus to die and the blameworthiness of his killers to the mutaṭawwiʿa, who went beyond the call of duty in risking their lives without thereby justifying their enemies. The term mutaṭawwiʿa declined from the 11th century onwards, being replaced by ghāzī (one who engages in ghazw) and mujāhid (one who engages in jihād).

== Bibliography ==
- Bonner, Michael David (1996). Aristocratic Violence and Holy War: Studies in the Jihad and the Arab–Byzantine Frontier. American Oriental Society.
- Bosworth, C. E. (1993). "Mutaṭawwiʿa". In Bosworth, C. E.; van Donzel, E.; Heinrichs, W. P. & Pellat, Ch. (eds.). The Encyclopaedia of Islam, Second Edition. Volume VII: Mif–Naz. Leiden: E. J. Brill. ISBN 978-90-04-09419-2.
- Hoyland, Robert G. (1997). Seeing Islam as Others Saw It: A Survey and Evaluation of Christian, Jewish and Zoroastrian Writings on Early Islam. Darwin Press.
- Sahner, Christian C. (2017). "'The Monasticism of My Community is Jihad': A Debate on Asceticism, Sex, and Warfare in Early Islam". Arabica. 64 (2): 149–183.
- Tor, Deborah Gerber (2007). Violent Order: Religious Warfare: Chivalry, and the ʿAyyār Phenomenon in the Medieval Islamic World. Ergon Verlag.
