= Hassan Husni Abd al-Wahhab =

Tunisian historian

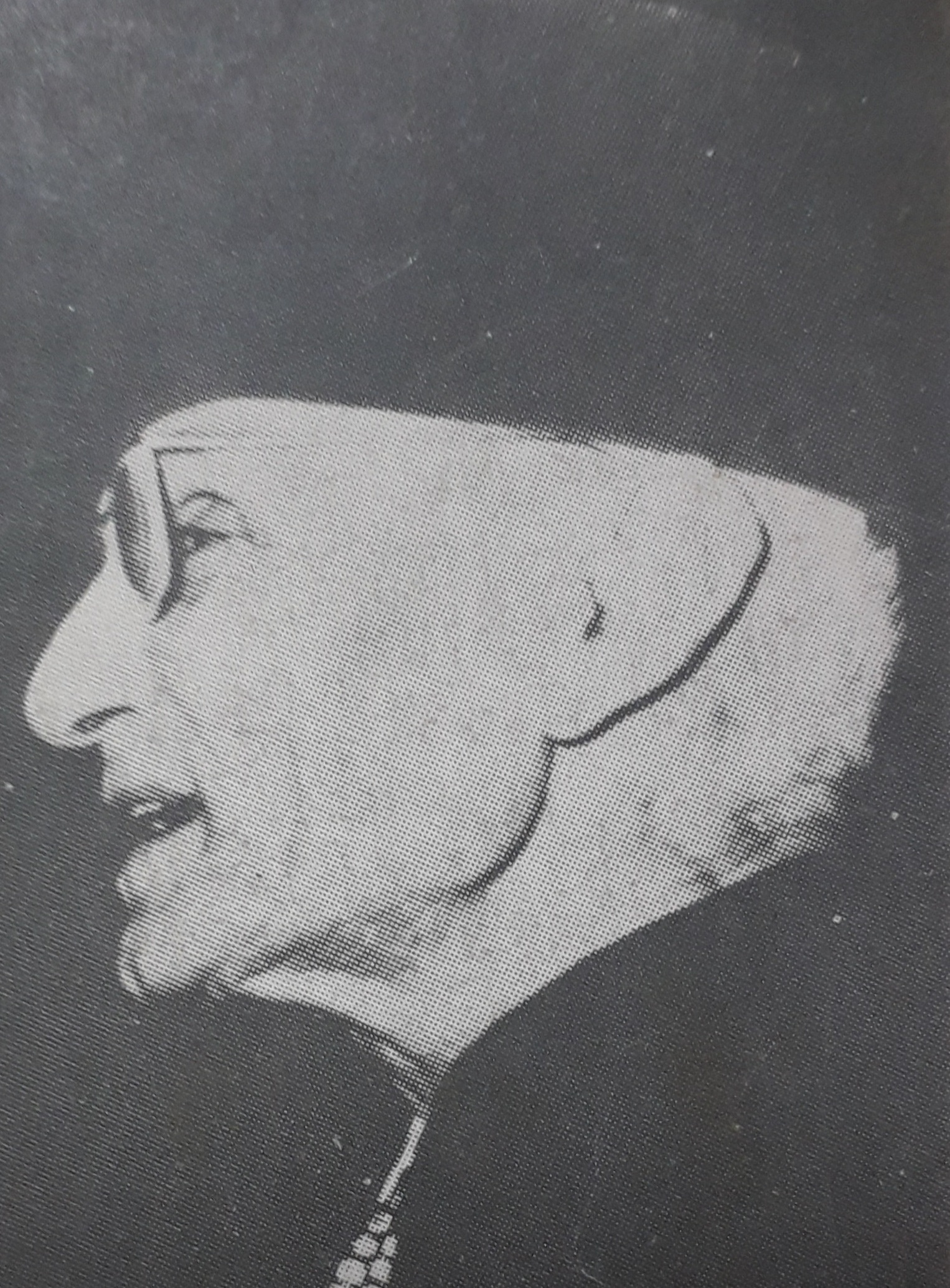

13th National Heritage Institute (Tunisia)
- In office 1962–1957

13th Ministry of the Pen
- In office 1947–1943
- Preceded by: Mahmoud El Materi
- Succeeded by: Habib Djellouli

National Archives of Tunisia
- In office 1920–1925
- Succeeded by: Mohamed Karoui

Personal details
- Born: 21 June 1884
- Died: 9 September 1968 (aged 84)
- Resting place: Jellaz Cemetery, Tunisia
- Occupation: Historian, politician, writer, linguist

Hassan Husni bin Saleh bin Abd al-Wahhab bin Yusuf Al-Samadhi Al-Tujibi. He was born in Tunis, on Monday 27 Ramadan 1301 AH / 21 July 1884 AD, and died there on Saturday 18 Sha’ban 1388 AH / 9 November 1968 AD. a Tunisian writer, linguist and historian, his name is compound: Hassan Husni.

== Biography ==
=== Origins ===
Hassan Husni Abd al-Wahhab descended from a family of wealth and prestige, as he descended from Banu Sumadih, one of the Taifa dynasties of Al-Andalus. His grandfather, Abdel-Wahhab Bin Youssef Al-Tujibi, was in charge of the affairs of the country's National Guard (Al-Hawanib) and presided over the ceremonies during the reign of the Husainid Beys during the reigns of Muhammad Bey, Hussein Bey and Mustafa Bey and Ahmed Bey I. His father, Saleh bin Abd al-Wahhab, held several positions in the state, including a special translator for the Minister of Foreign Affairs, General Hussein, and for the governor of the Bey in Al-A'rad (southern Tunisia) and Mahdia. As for his mother, he is descended from Ali bin Mustafa Agha Qayserli, one of Hayreddin Pasha's chief aides.

=== His upbringing ===
He received his primary education in one of the kuttabs of Tunis, then at the elementary school in Mahdia, where he memorized a quarter of the Qur’an and began learning French. Then he entered the first French school in the city and obtained the primary school certificate in 1899. At that time, he joined the Sadiki College (El-Sadqiya High School) where he studied Arabic and translation, then he went to the French capital, Paris, and joined the Paris Institute of Political Studies. However, he returned to Tunisia upon the death of his father in 1904.

=== Career path ===
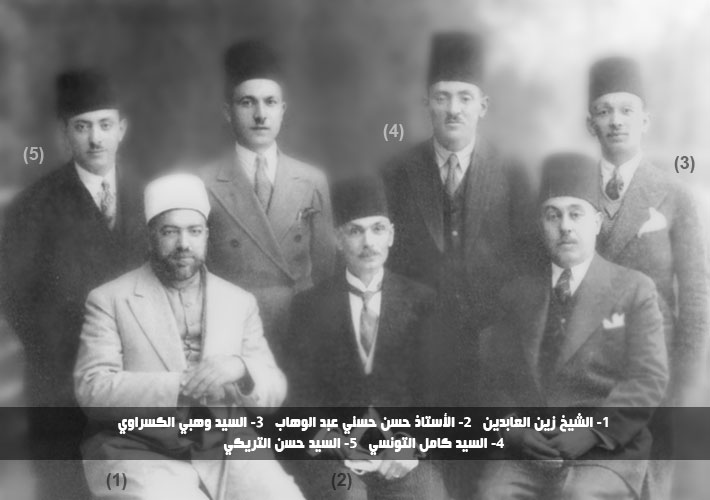
Hassan Hosni Abdel Wahhab (center) with a group of Tunisian intellectuals.

Hassan Hosni Abdel Wahhab fluctuated in several administrative positions, as he worked in the Department of Agriculture and Trade between 1905 and 1910, then he was appointed head of the administration of the Zayatin Forest in northern Tunisia. During the First World War, he was head of the Department of Economic Affairs in 1916. In 1920, he was appointed of the National Archives of Tunisia and he was the first to index its contents. In the same year, he was appointed as a governor over Mathalith in the city of Jebiniana, and he moved with the same plan in 1928 to Mahdia and stayed there until 1935, to move to the city of Nabeul. In 1939, he returned to the city of Tunis to be appointed as Under-Secretary of the Local and Regional Administration for the Internal Affairs of the Country. Then, he was appointed head of the Awqaf Authority between 1942 and 1943. On 3 May of this year, he was appointed Minister of the Pen at the beginning of the reign of Muhammad al-Amin Bey, and he continued in this position until July 1947. After independence, he was appointed head of the National Heritage Institute between 1957 and 1962 and established during this period five museums, four of them for Islamic antiquities, and the fifth for Roman antiquities in Carthage.

=== Scientific activity ===
Despite his assumption of administrative positions, Hassan Husni Abd al-Wahhab had a scientific and cultural activity, as he did not stop writing, giving lessons and lectures. Hassan Husni Abd al-Wahhab participated in a large number of scientific and cultural conferences outside Tunisia, including: the orientalist conference organized in Algiers in 1905, he also participated in the Copenhagen conference in Denmark in 1908, the Paris conference of French orientalists in 1922 and the Ribat Al-Fath conference in Morocco in 1927, and the Cairo Congress of Arab Music in 1932, along with several other conferences and symposia in which he represented the Tunisian government.

In addition, Hassan Husni Abd al-Wahhab has been a member of the Arab Academy of Damascus since 1919, the Academy of the Arabic Language in Cairo since 1932, the Iraqi Academy of Sciences and the French Academy of Engravings and Fine Arts since 1939, He is also a member of the Egyptian Institute and a corresponding member of the Spanish History Institute. He also had the opportunity to teach history at the Khaldounia School between 1910 and 1924.

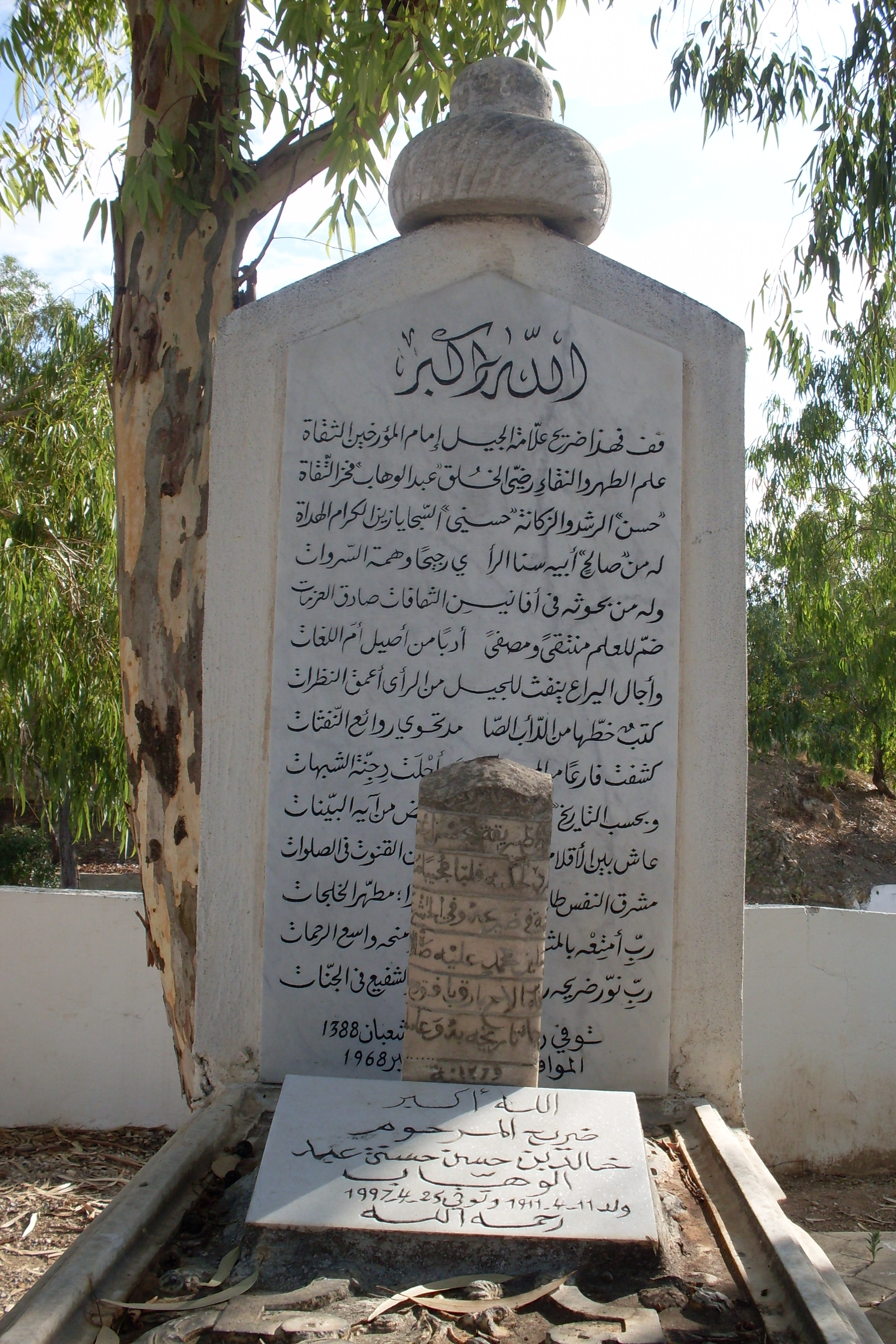
The tomb of Hassan Hosni Abdel-Wahhab and his son Khaled in Al-Jalaz cemetery.

Besides Arabic, Hassan Husni Abd al-Wahhab speaks fluent French, and is relatively fluent in Italian and Turkish.

== Interest in heritage ==
Hassan Husni Abd al-Wahhab was fond of collecting manuscripts and rare books, and during his life he collected a large number of precious manuscripts and presented them to the Tunisian National Library. Among the most important oldest copies of the Qur’an in the library of Hassan Husni Abd al-Wahhab in the National Library are the following:

- Fragment of a copy in antique kufic script, of 70 leaves.
- A piece of a copy, in antique Maghrebi script, written on parchment of 83 leaves.
- Fragment of a copy in antique kufic script, totaling 183 leaves.
- A piece of a copy written on parchment in kufic script, consisting of 49 leaves.

== Books ==
Hassan Husni Abd al-Wahhab has published an important number of books:

- The School Selection in Tunisian Literature, first edition, Tunis, 1908.
- The Carnelian Carpet in the Civilization of Kairouan and its poet Ibn Rashik, first edition, Tunis, 1912.
- Summary of Tunisian History, first edition, Tunisia, 1918.
- Guidance to the rules of economics, first edition, Tunisia 1919.
- The entire history of Tunisian literature, first edition, Tunisia 1927.
- Famous Tunisian women, first edition, Tunisia 1934.
- Imam Al-Māzrī, Dar Al-Kutub Al-Sharqiah, Tunisia, 1955.
- Papers on Arab Civilization in Tunisian Ifriqiya, in which he collected some of his articles published in magazines, and issued in three volumes, the first part in 1965 and the second in 1966.
- The Book of Al-Omar fi Tunisian Works and Authors, reviewed by Bashir Al-Bakoush and Mohammed Al-Arousi Al-Mutawi, published in 4 parts by Dar Al-Gharb Al-Islami in Beirut in 1990.

Among the books compiled by Hassan Husni Abd al-Wahhab are:

- A'mālu Al-A'lām in his section History of Ifriqiya and Sicily by Lisan al-Din Al-Khatib, printed in Palermo in 1910.
- Letters in Criticism of Poetry and Poets by Ibn Sharaf al-Qayrawani, published for the first time in 1911 in the Damascus magazine Al-Muqtabas.
- Malqā Al-Sabīl by Abu Al-Ala Al-Maarri, it was published in Al-Muqtab magazine in 1912 l.
- Description of Ifriqiya and Al-Andalus, taken from Ibn Fadlallah al-Umari's book Masalak Al-Absar, published in Tunisia in 1920.
- Kitābu Yaf'ūl by Saghani, which was published in Tunisia in 1924.
- Insight into Trade by Al-Jahiz, first edition in Damascus in 1933, a second in Egypt in 1925, and a third in Beirut in 1966.
- The Book of Etiquette for Teachers by Muhammad bin Sahnoun, published in Tunis in 1934.
- Al-Jumāna fi Izālati Al-Ratāna in Andalusian and Tunisian dialects by an unknown author, edition of the Scientific Institute in Egypt, 1953.
- The Journey of Al-Tijāni by Abdallah al-Tijani, Tunis 1958 edition.

As for his works and research, they are:

- The Islamic takeover of Sicily, Tunis edition in 1905.
- The combination of the elements that make up the Tunisian people, edition in 1917 .
- The Progress of Arabic music in the Mashriq, the Maghreb and Al-Andalus, edition in 1918.
- Research on two Norman dinars in Mahdia, edition in 1930.
- An eyewitness to the Conquest of Al-Andalus, edition in 1932.
- A Turning Point in the History of the Aghlabids: The Revolt of Al-Tanbadhi, edition in 1937.

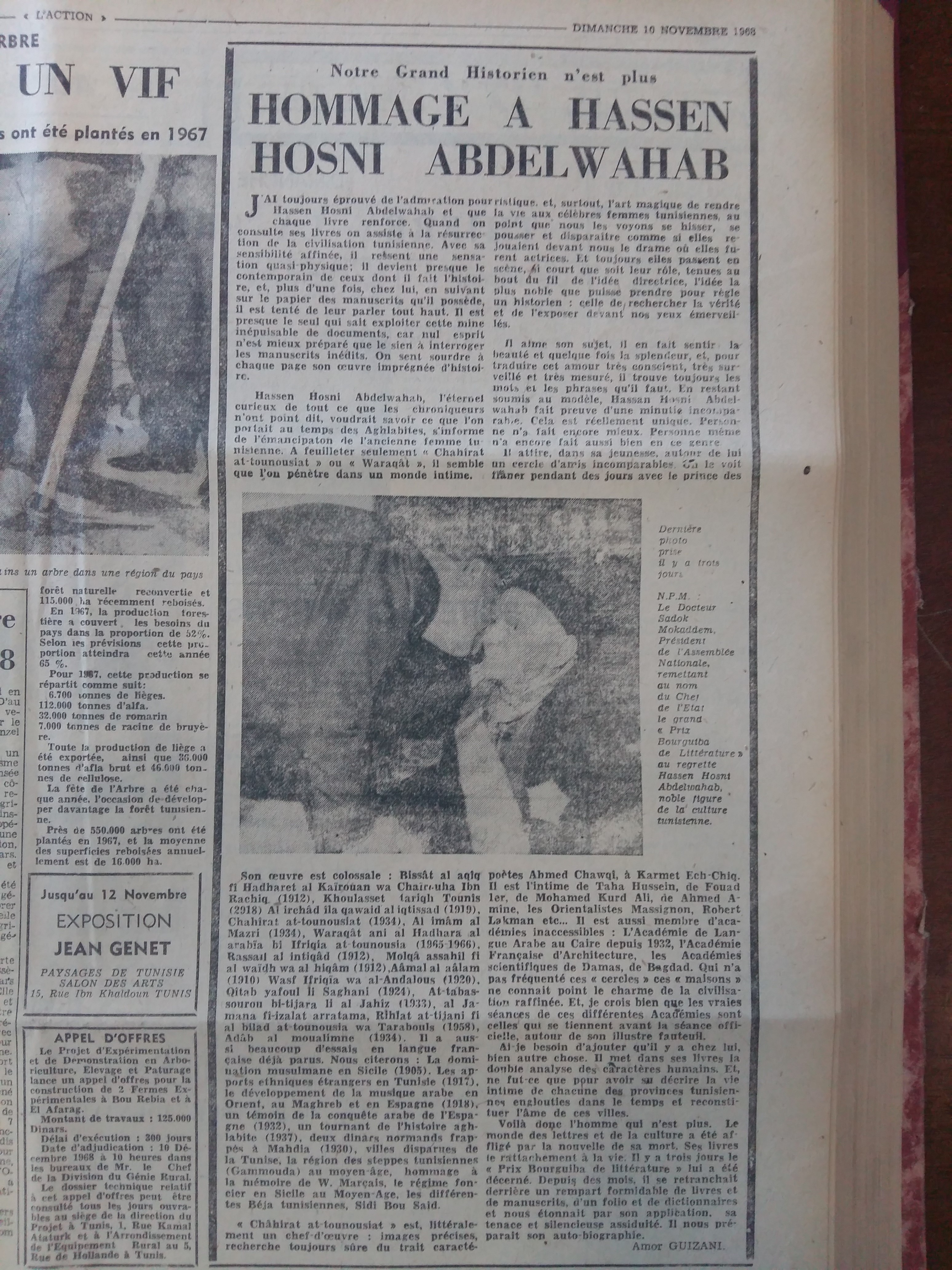
"Tribute to Hassen Hosni Abdelwahab"

== Awards and honours ==
- Honorary Doctorate from the University of Science in Cairo in 1950 .
- An honorary doctorate from the Algerian University of Sciences in 1960, he did not go for his support of the Algerian liberation revolution .
- The State Appreciation Award in 1968, two days before his death, received on his behalf by the Speaker of the National Assembly, Sadok Mokaddem.
