= David Wilmshurst =

British historian

- Born: July 1956 (age 70)
- Education: Northampton Grammar School; Worcester College, Oxford
- Occupations: Colonial Administrator, Academic Editor, Ecclesiastical Historian
- Known for: History of Syriac Christianity

David Wilmshurst is a British historian who specializes in the history of Syriac Christianity. He took his doctorate in Oriental Studies from the University of Oxford.

Wilmshurst is able to read Syriac , Arabic and some Chinese. He has published multiple volumes on Syriac Christianity, one major being about the Church of the East.

== Career ==
Between May 1980 and September 1982, he worked in the New Territories Administration. His daily work and interactions with members of the local community gave him the opportunity to improve both his spoken Cantonese and his ability to read Chinese.

In September 2002 Wilmshurst returned to Hong Kong to pursue a career as an Academic Editor. Between 2002 and 2016 he worked first at the University of Hong Kong (2002–2008), and then at the Chinese University of Hong Kong (2008–2016).

== Engagement with Syriac Christianity ==
Wilmshurst’s interest in Syriac Christianity was first aroused in January 1989, when he made a duty visit to the cities of Fuzhou, Quanzhou and Xiamen in Fujian Province as part of a Hong Kong Government delegation. The delegation visited a museum in Quanzhou which contained Christian and Muslim tombstones from the Yuan dynasty period.

Intrigued by these artefacts of medieval Syriac Christianity in China, Wilmshurst began to read everything available in Hong Kong on the history of the Church of the East. During this time, he produced an English translation and an analysis of 'Upper Cloud Music' (上雲樂), a poem written by the Tang dynasty poet Li Bo, as a tribute to the Emperor Suzong of Tang (reign 756 to 762 CE) during the An Lushan rebellion. Wilmshurst argued that the poem contained subtle allusions to Christianity, reflecting the close ties between Emperor Suzong and leaders of the Syriac Church who supported him during the rebellion.

While still in Industry Department, Wilmshurst produced an article on the ‘Syrian Brilliant Teaching‘, which was subsequently published in the Journal of the Hong Kong Branch of the Royal Asiatic Society. The article describes the Syriac Christian Church in China, primarily during the Tang period, and examines the meaning of the phrase Syrian Brilliant Teaching. In a parallel effort, Wilmshurst completed a translation of the Xi'an Stele, a copy of which can be found in the digital library of the American Foundation for Syriac Studies, entitled ‘A Monument to the Spread of the Syrian Brilliant Teaching in China’ (大秦景教流行中國碑).

In July 1992, he decided to resign from the Hong Kong Government and returned to England to further his interest in learning Syriac and Arabic. Between October 1993 and July 1998, he pursued a D Phil in Oriental Studies from Oxford University, studying under Sebastian Brock. He learned to read Syriac and Arabic during this period. His D Phil thesis, ‘The Ecclesiastical Organisation of the Church of the East, 1318–1913’, was published in the Corpus Scriptorum Christianorum Orientalium (CSCO) series in 2000. It was notable for its use of more than 2,000 manuscript colophons to fill in important information on the organisation of the church in the post-Mongol period, a largely neglected area of research.

In 2011 Wilmshurst published 'The Martyred Church: A History of the Church of the East.' In 2016 he published an English translation of the Ecclesiastical History of the West Syriac author Bar Hebraeus. His fourth book Mar Zay'a: The Saint of Jilu, which was published in September 2026, is a translation of a Syriac Life of the legendary saint Mar Zay'a written by an unknown author from the Jilu district. The translation is accompanied by a commentary which sheds light on the way in which the legend was elaborated in the villages of the Sapna and Hakkari regions.

Wilmshurst has discussed the history of the Church of the East with His Holiness Mar Awa III Royel (Catholicos-Patriarch of the Assyrian Church of the East)

most recently in October 2025 when Mar Awa III visited Hong Kong.

== Other academic interests ==
After returning to work in Hong Kong at CUHK, he contributed an article in 2010 for the 50th anniversary edition of the Journal of the Royal Asiatic Society Hong Kong Branch which included an English translation of the entries in the journal of the French naval hydrographer Charles Dominique fr: Maurice Rollet de l'lsle (1859-1943), recording his impressions of three visits to Hong Kong during the Sino French War.

== Personal life ==
Between 1994 and 1999, Wilmshurst was a member of the British folk group Three Pressed Men. Wilmshurst is Morris dancer, having been a member of the Hong Kong Morris.

Wilmshurst is a former Wikipedia editor, having written or edited numerous articles on various aspects of Syriac Christianity. Part of his motivation for writing The Martyred Church was alleged to be frustration by conflicts due to the Assyrian naming dispute, in which he stated:

"I have outflanked these miserable insects – as the Nestorian patriarch Elisha (524-39) amiably termed his opponents – by writing my own book on the subject, in the hope that after it is published I can bludgeon them into submission by citing it as an authority."

== Bibliography ==
- The Ecclesiastical Organisation of the Church of the East, 1318–1913. 2000.
- The Martyred Church: A History of the Church of the East. 2011.
- Bar Hebraeus: The Ecclesiastical Chronicle. 2016.
- Mar Zayʿa: The Saint of Jilu. 2026.
