= Kitāb Hurūshiyūsh =

Arabic translation of Adversus paganos historiarum libri septem

- Author: Unknown translator, based on Orosius's Historiae adversus paganos
- Language: Arabic
- Subject: History
- Genre: Translation
- Publication date: Unknown
- Publication place: Al-Andalus
- English publication date: 2022 (anticipated)
- Media type: Manuscript
- Pages: 129

The Kitāb Hurūshiyūsh (Arabic: كتاب هروشيوش) is the name conventionally given to a medieval Arabic translation of Orosius's early fifth-century Historiae adversus paganos. It seems also to have been known to medieval Arabic-speaking historians as Ta’rīḫ Rūma ("history of Rome" and Kitāb waṣf al-duwal wa-’l-ḥurūb ("the book of the description of dynasties and wars"). The translation is not unique as an Andalusian translation of a Christian text into Arabic, but few others survive as they were no longer preserved once Arabic ceased to be widely read in the Iberian Peninsula. In the assessment of Ann Christys, the unique manuscript of the Arabic Orosius is now 'their most important representative.'

== Origins ==
Ibn Khaldun, who quoted extensively from the book, noted that it was translated by the Christian Bishop of Cordoba (قاضي النصرانية) in collaboration with a Muslim scholar, Qasim Ibn Asbagh, but the date of its origin is uncertain. Bernard Lewis speculated that it was the first and only translation of a western European work into Arabic until the sixteenth century. Ibn Juljul (d. 994) also mentions the book and states that it was in Latin and that, "there are many people who can read it in your country (i.e. Cordoba) and are able to translate it to Arabic" but without mentioning who actually did the translation. Medieval historians speculated about its origin, suggesting that it was by Ḥafṣ ibn Albār, noted for his translation into Arabic of the Psalms, and associated with the court of al-Ḥakam II, but while this may not be wrong, there is no convincing evidence to support these claims. Another suggested Christian translator is Bishop Reccemund of Elvira (ربيع إبن زيد, Rabi' ibn Zayd), who was the ambassador of Abd al-Rahman III to King Otto I in 956.

== Style ==
According to Ann Christys,

the translators were obviously struggling with their material. Orosius' convoluted style was difficult to understand, and they may have been working with a corrupt version of the Histories. They took great liberties with the text, abbreviating and transposing it and sprinkling their effort with disclaimers, such as 'we have suppressed this, but through a love of conciseness and not wanting to go on at length'. They left out almost the whole of Orosius' prefaces to Books 5, 6 and 7. Some sections may have been omitted because they were incomprehensible. Others were glossed extensively. There are many spelling mistakes, particularly in the names of places and people, although some of these may be the fault of later copyists. There are many instances of muslim influence on the text, which begins with the bismillah, the opening words of the Qurʾan. The clearest example of Arabicizing is the presentation of personal names in their Arabic form X ibn Y. This necessitated the invention of names for the forgotten fathers of the heroes of antiquity. The founder of Rome became Romulus ibn Marcus ... Emperors were almost always made the son of their predecessor. Some of the biblical characters were given the forms of their names as they appear in the Qurʾan. Mount Ararat, where the Ark came to rest, was identified with Mount Judi, according to islamic belief.

A quotation from the verse of Virgil was rendered into Arabic verse. There are many additions to Orosius's material, many of which could have come from the works of Isidore of Seville, particularly his Chronicle.

== Manuscript ==
The text is known from one, paper manuscript, Columbia University Library MS X-893 712 H, of 129 pages. The manuscript is thought to be missing a couple of pages from the beginning and its contents list shows that it is missing several pages from the end, which moreover once extended Orosius's history as far as the Umayyad conquest of Hispania in 711. The origin of the manuscript is uncertain: somewhere in Hispania or North Africa (more likely the latter), perhaps from the thirteenth or fourteenth century (again, more likely the latter). Both the translation and the surviving manuscript could have been made for either a Muslim or Christian audience: the manuscript contains both a gloss in Latin, suggesting a Christian reader, and glosses on two folios in Arabic criticising Christian belief.

== Influence ==
The translation was influential on Arabic historians, especially Ibn Khaldūn, who was the only Muslim historian to quote from it extensively.

== Editions and translations ==
- 1982, Tarikh al-'alam, Orosius (The History of the World, Orosius), by Abderrahman Badawi - Beirut. The first published complete modern Arabic edition, based on the unique manuscript of New York.
- 2001, Kitāb Hurūšiyūš (كتاب هروشيوش): traducción Árabe de las Historiae adversus paganos de Orosio / edición y estudio Mayte Penelas - Consejo Superior de Investigaciones Científicas : Agencia Española de cooperación internacional. The Arabic text, and an introduction in Spanish.

A Horizon 2020-funded project promised an English translation of the Kitāb Hurūshiyūsh by Marco Di Branco, to be published in 2022.

- Marco Di Branco (trans.), Ibn Ḫaldūn tra Alessandro e Cesare: la Grecia e Roma nel Libro degli esempi. (Kitāb al-ʻIbar, II 149 BĀ - 172 BĀ ed. Chabbouh) (Il Poligrafo, 2020), ISBN 978-88-93870-93-1

== Notes ==
1.وكتب أرمانيوس في كتابه إلى الناصر أن كتاب ديسقوريدس لا تُجنى فائدته إلا برجل يحسن العبارة باللسان اليوناني ويعرف أشخاص تلك الأدوية فإن كان في بلدك من يحسن ذلك, فُزتَ أيها الملك بفائدة الكتاب. وأما كتاب هروسيس فعندك في بلدك من اللطينيين من يقرأه باللسان اللطيني, وإن كاشفتهم عنه نقلوه لك من اللطيني إلى اللسان العربي.
