= Al-Machriq =

Jesuit magazine in Beirut (1898–1998)

- Founder: Louis Cheikho
- Founded: 1898
- Final issue: 1998
- Country: Ottoman Syria; Greater Lebanon; Lebanon
- Based in: Beirut
- Language: Arabic

Al-Machriq (Arabic: المشرق ALA-LC: Al-Mashriq 'The East') was a journal founded in 1898 by the Jesuit and Chaldean Catholic priest Louis Cheikho, and published by Jesuit fathers of Saint Joseph University in Beirut (modern-day Lebanon). The subtitle was Revue Catholique Orientale. Sciences, Lettres, Arts. Cheikho edited Al-Bashir in addition to Al-Machriq. Al-Machriq played a significant role in reviving classical Arabic. It extensively dealt with the rapport between the Maronites and the Marada, two Christian groups living in the region. In the initial phase the magazine also featured literary work. It had run through 72 volumes by 1998.

== Bibliography ==
- R.B. Campbell: The Arabic Journal `al-Machriq'... under the editorship of Père L. Cheikho, University of Michigan, Ann Arbor, 1972.
