= Hafs ibn Albar =

Visigothic Bible translator

Hafs ibn Albar al-Qūṭī
- Count of the Christians of Toledo
- Reign: before 889 until after 961 (?)
- Full name: Ḥafṣ ibn Albar al-Qūṭī al-Qurṭubî
- Native name: حفص ابن البر القوطي القرطبي
- Family: House of Egica
- Father: Álvaro of Córdoba (debated)
- Occupation: Translator

Arabic name
- Personal (Ism): Ḥafṣ حفص
- Patronymic (Nasab): ibn Albar ابن البر
- Epithet (Laqab): al-Qūṭī (the Goth) القوطي
- Toponymic (Nisba): al-Qurṭubî (the Cordoban) القرطبي

Hafs ibn Albar al-Qūṭī (Arabic: حفص بن البر القوطي), commonly known as al-Qūṭī or al-Qurṭubî, was a 9th–10th century Visigothic Christian count, theologian, translator and poet, often memorialised as the 'Last of the Goths'. He was a descendant of Visigothic royalty and held a position of power over the Christians of his region. He was possibly a priest or censor, but many scholars take him to be a layman. He describes himself as ignorant of the sacred sciences, and constantly allowed his works to be checked and commented on by those he called "best in their religion and a bright light in the sacred sciences", claiming that "all of them know what I do not know".

He wrote in Arabic, which had then become a common language of Mozarabic Christians living in al-Andalus. Arabic was slow to be adopted by the Iberian Catholic Clergy because the Arabic language was enforced by the Islamic government and the Church wanted to appear completely separate from Islam. Hafs ibn Albar's work in translating the Psalms and other theological works has been characterised as integral to the preservation of the Iberian Church under Islam as it allowed Christians who had been raised in an Arabic culture to fully participate in the Christian faith.

== Background ==
Towards the end of the Visigothic period of Iberian history, the Visigoths were ruled by a monarchy elected by the Church. This system had been stable for some time, but eventually the children of former kings became claimants to the throne and civil wars broke out. In 711, the Visigothic Kingdom, in the middle of one such civil war, fell to Islamic forces. During the invasion there were two Visigothic claimants: the main claimant Roderic ruled from the ancient capital of Toledo and he controlled South-West, whereas Achila II ruled Tarraconensis and Narbonensis in the North-East. Achila was succeeded by his younger brother Ardo in Narbonensis alone as Tarraconensis had been taken by Islamic forces.

al-Andalus in the 10th century

The fate of the conquered Christians varied from case to case. Standard Dhimmi contracts usually gave Christians and Jews fewer rights than their Muslim counterparts. Nobles, such as Count Theodimir, often managed to negotiate treaties which allowed them to keep some of their status, land and wealth, along with the rights of their subjects. The children of King Wittiza, the penultimate Visigothic king before the Islamic invasion, negotiated treaties and retained great significance. Al-Maqqari and the Chronicle of Alfonso III refer to them as Romulus, Artabasdus and Olmundus. Other chronicles and genealogies mention Evan and Sisebut in addition to the other sons of Wittiza. Romulus settled in Toledo and held extensive lands in the east of Spain. Some Scholars believe that the names Romulus and Artabasdus are corruptions of Achila and Ardo respectively. This would explain Romulus' holdings in the east of Spain.

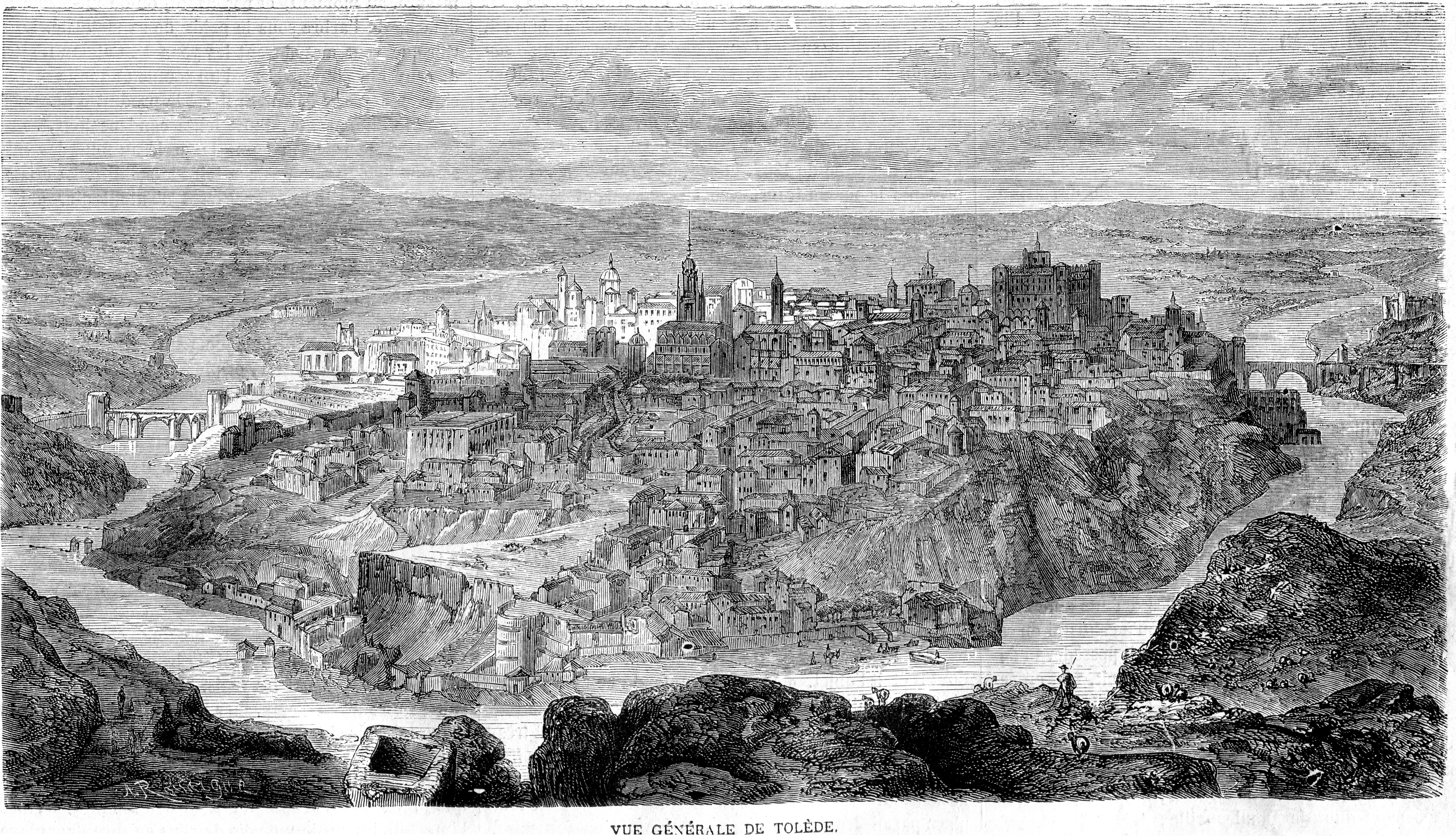
The City of Toledo

In the centuries following the Islamic conquest of Spain, Romulus' descendants had significant power over the Mozarabs of al-Andalus due to the fact that the representatives of Christian communities, called counts, were required to be Christians themselves. Hafs ibn Albar was a descendant of Romulus and the Count of the Christians of Toledo (although Ibn al-Qūṭiyya refers to him as the Judge or Qadi). Other Christian communities had counts, such as Flavius Athaulf of Coimbra, son of the aforementioned Prince Sisebut. Abû Sa’îd al-Qûmis, a descendant of Artabasdus, was Count of the Christians of al-Andalus, possibly because he lived in Cordoba, the capital of al-Andalus. Abû Sa’îd held extensive estates in central al-Andalus.

=== Name ===
Hafs is usually remembered by his patronym 'ibn Albar', usually taken to refer to him being the son of Álvaro of Córdoba, although some claim that Hafs is more likely to be Álvaro's grandson or descendant. He is also remembered either as al-Qūṭī (the Goth) or al-Qurṭubî (the Cordoban). Some take al-Qurṭubî to be a toponym. Others believe that al-Qurṭubî is either a corruption of al-Qūṭī or a deliberate attempt to link him more closely with Álvaro. He is believed to have had been born with a full Latin or Gothic name, but this has been lost.

In one manuscript he is referred to as ibn al-Quti (Son of the Goth). He appears in Judaeo-Spanish texts as Héféç al-Qouti. In Maghrebi texts he instead appears as Alfuti. This is because the letters: ق and ف (usually romanised as q and f respectively) are especially similar in the Maghrebi Arabic alphabet. Such scribal errors at times confused details about his background. David Colville, the first person to translate the works of Hafs ibn Albar into English, believed that Hafs was Jewish. Adolf Neubauer refuted this based on the other works of Hafs, such as his pro-Christian polemics, which were unavailable to Colville. He also rejected the hypothesis that Hafs was a Jewish converso on the basis that Jewish writers who felt uncomfortable with using the works of apostates used the works of Hafs extensively. Neubauer believed Hafs to be an Arab or Syriac Christian due to his use of eastern forms of Arabic. His nickname, 'the Goth', and his gothic patronym suggest a gothic background and not an Arab/Syriac one. Today, he is taken to be of Visigothic background.

== Works ==
Hafs wrote all of his surviving works in Arabic. One of the reasons he did this was to remove, or at least weaken, the link between the Arabic language and Islam. While some see Hafs as moving away from Álvaro's beliefs, which is often taken to be opposed to Arabism, others think of him as equally missionary-minded and interested in preserving Christian beliefs and culture. Others think Álvaro believed that Arabisation "would open the door to the assimilation of a series of Islamic ideas and practices opposed to Christian orthodoxy", aligning Hafs and Álvaro much more closely. It seems that Álvaro himself was Arabised and had a good grasp of Classical Arabic and Arabic poetry, so his apparent denunciation of that language and culture is unlikely to be a hypocritical rejection of Arabism per se, but rather a fear about being inducted into Islamic or Islamised culture. While Álvaro focused on defending Christianity and to an extent, Latin-speaking Visigothic culture, Hafs was subtly challenging Islam by associating Arabic with Christian works. Hafs lived at a time when there were many considered to be al-‘ajamiyyah, that is a native speaker of a non-Arabic language, while nevertheless mastering the Arabic language. By belonging to a linguistic hybridism, Hafs was able to participate in both Gothic and Arabic cultures. His works, despite being written in Arabic, were essentially written by a Goth for a Gothic audience similar to Álvaro's works.

Yet, he certainly went beyond Álvaro in that he used Islamised vocabulary throughout his works (such as referring to the Psalms as suras), even when he expressed Christian ideas completely in opposition to Islam, such as the Trinity or that the Psalms were prophecies of Jesus' life. His free use of complex Arabic poetic forms and Islamic-sounding language limited the marginalisation that Christians felt during the 10th century and after. All major Mozarabic intellectuals who lived after Hafs used Arabic extensively.

=== Arabic Psalter ===
Hafs translated the entire book of Psalms into the Arabic language with a poetic urjūzah prologue of his own, completing the work in 889AD. Each Psalm has a heading explaining whether the Psalm relates to Christ's life, the Church or the spiritual health of believers. An example of this is his heading to Psalm 1, which states "This Psalm predicts the Nativity of the Messiah, the son of Mary". The urjūzah prologue served to answer criticisms of his previous translations and to anticipate criticisms of his Psalter. In it, he justified the methods he used to translate the Psalms, as well his use of not only the Arabic language but poetic forms specific to Andalusi culture that may have been controversial at the time. Hafs only consulted "scholars, trustworthy men of our religion" during his translation, so his form of Arabic represents Christian Arabic independent of Islamic Arabic. This does show some influence of Islamic legal terminology.

He translated the Psalter with the help and permission of Bishop Valens or Valentius of Córdoba (862-875), a partisan of Abbot Samson Cordubensis and a correspondent of Alvarus, whom Hafs highly esteemed and described as "noted for his sublime qualities, the best bishop now as well as in the past". As the author of the Apologeticus Contra Perfidos, Abbot Samson is noted for being among the last major Mozarabic writers to write in Latin who nevertheless turned his attention to translating works from Latin to Arabic, "epitomising the new reality" of Arabic language prominence in the Mozarabic community. Hafs belonged to the next generation of Mozarabic scholars whose "grasp of Arabic was more secure".

It was based on an earlier prose version that Hafs translated from the Old Latin Bible. His newer, more poetic version used the Vulgate more. He resolved, however, not to translate from the Vulgate "word-for-word" as another author's earlier prose version did, something he said was "not worthy of admiration", because he said "he ruined the meanings through his ignorance of the laws of the language. He strictly kept to the order of the words with the result that he spoiled the interpretation. What he translated was not understood..." Although it agrees with the Old Latin more than the Vulgate, this earlier prose version may have drawn directly from the Septuagint and Peshitta.

This Arabic translation is significant as for some it represents a turning point in the cultural assimilation of native Christians. Only thirty years prior, Álvaro seemed to denounce the use of Arabic amongst Christians. Hafs, on the other hand, fully embraced the Arabic language and his Psalms were translated in Arabic rajaz verses. He was aware that rajaz verses were considered inferior amongst Arabs, but he defended its use on the grounds that it was easily understood and allowed for a literal translation. It was his belief that the Psalms were essentially Hebrew rajaz. He also defended the use of rajaz metre because he described it as "a meter pleasant for singing, called among the Latins iambic". It also enabled him to utilise Latin poems of a similar metre, and he admits to using a Latin reference for his work. If Hafs is considered to be furthering Álvaro's agenda rather than departing from it, he may be interpreted as "conditioning Arabic to Latin" which would help to prove the superiority of Gothic culture. It may, however, be an example of Semeticism as he may be trying to "reach through" the Latin text to attain the Hebrew original. He expresses enough confidence in the similarity between Arabic and Hebrew to refer to the Psalms as Hebrew rajaz, but believed that the Psalms had been preserved "all in Latin, in their original, in a well-defined meter". This also served to easily enable his Psalter to be used in Mozarabic liturgy, using the established melodies used in Latin forms, achieving something that the previous prose Psalters could not.

He used his knowledge of Hebrew and Arabic and how these languages related to each other to calque words as he felt was needed, though some have argued that he did not know Hebrew. Rather than using the standard word for God, Allah, he used Lahumma or Allahumma inspired by the Hebrew word Elohim. This may have contributed to his Psalter's popularity in Jewish and Christian circles. It also contributed to his goal of providing Mozarabic Christians with their own identity expressed in the Arabic language. There are many examples within his Psalter of him choosing words with similar roots between Arabic and Hebrew to maintain 'faithfulness and conciseness without adding and padding; and Semitism, i.e., the frequency of Arabic words which are from the same root as the Hebrew original.' Nevertheless, there are the occasional "odd readings" of the Hebrew text that may be evidence of use or overuse of the Vulgate in interpreting the Psalms. When comparing his version to other Arabic Psalters, it is not as easy as saying one is more accurate or faithful. Arie Schippers characterises Hafs as "reasonably accurate, but sometimes he allows himself a greater space, extending the text with synonyms and additions, probably by the constraint of the metre" whereas Saadia Gaon's "translation usually pursues the literal meaning and sequence of the Hebrew words... However, he sometimes adds to the texts references to the speaking personae".

Hafs defended his translation on the basis of 1 Corinthians 14, which he interpreted to be the Apostle Paul advocating for the translation of scripture. He said that the Apostle expected people to pray in their own languages. Hafs believed that the Psalms were the bedrock of Christian prayer. He used the example of the translations of the Psalms into Greek, Syriac, Persian and Latin to justify his own translation. Hafs said "They only believe and pray to their Lord in the language they know... in order that each language expresses faith in God". He also appealed to the authority of Bishop Valens and a number of monks and priests who encouraged him in his work. He clarified that he intended his translation of the Psalms to be used liturgically in churches and monasteries and for 'the forgiveness of sins', though he acknowledged that his work would not be necessary for Christians who had totally retired from the World.

Hafs' later works often quote the Gospels as translated by Isḥâq ibn Balashk al-Qurṭubî (Spanish: Isaac Velasco the Cordoban), completed either 904 or 942 (depending on how one reads the dating inscription), making the translation of the Psalms Hafs' earliest work. His is not the oldest translation of the Psalms into Arabic. Archbishop John of Seville (remembered in Arabic as: زيد المطران Zayd al-Matran) is believed to have produced the translation of the Psalms, Epistles and Gospels preserved in MS Madrid 4971. He also provided a commentary and took part in the Council of Cordoba in 839. He became bishop in 831 and died 851. Hafs' version is said to be more fluent and complex, while John's version is strict and literal.

=== Other works ===
Hafs has also been thought to have translated (or rather compiled and interpolated) Orosius' Seven Books of History Against the Pagans as the Kitāb Hurūshiyūsh, though this is now doubted. Hafs style and skill in Arabic seems to be at odds with the Kitāb Hurūshiyūsh. The style, but certainly not the content, of the Kitāb Hurūshiyūsh is also much more Islamic. The Kitāb Hurūshiyūsh eulogises Orosius with "raḥmat allāh ‘alay-hī", that is ‘may Allah be merciful upon him’ which departs from Hafs' preferred theonym Allahumma. Similarly Abraham is called "al-Ǧalīl Allāh", Allah's Friend. The Islamisation of the Kitāb Hurūshiyūsh should not be overstated as it significantly departures from the Islamic account of the Seven Sleepers, among other accounts. It does, however, show that either Hafs changed his view of Islamised Arabic or the Kitāb Hurūshiyūsh was translated by another Mozarab.

Hafs has also been credited with Arabic translations of the works of Jerome. Hafs thought very highly of Jerome, describing him as "the first in his science" and recommending his Vulgate ”for teaching and interpretation”.

He wrote a number of original works as well. His Treatise on the Trinity (or The Book of Fifty-seven Questions ) is considered to be the first anti-Islamic polemic written in Arabic in the West. He also wrote a treatise called al-Fiqh (الْفِقْه, meaning Knowledge) and two books: Kitab al-Huruf (the Book of Letters) and Kitâb al-Masâ’il al-Sab῾ wa-al-Khamsîn (the Book of the Fifty-Seven Questions). He also used term uqnum from the Syriac qnoma in his Book of the Fifty-Seven Questions. Hafs differs from them in a clear adoption of the filioque in that work.

Jewish writers of later years referred to Hafs as the author of the Book of al-Quti, a compilation of moral maxims.

== Death and legacy ==
Ibn Qūṭiyya wrote that Hafs ibn Albar was still alive in 961. Given that Hafs says in the prologue to his Psalter that it "was written in the year 889 in the ear of Christ our Lord, who guides the soul on the right path", it seems that Hafs' career was at least 72 years long. Hafs was highly esteemed among the Christians, Jews and Muslims of Spain and his works describing the Trinity, the nature of Christ and the Eucharist were seen as definitive long after his death. His translation of the Psalms also remained popular after his death, not only for its intended Ecclesiastic and Monastic use, but among Muslims and Jews as well. It is this version that Al-Qurtubi, Moses ibn Ezra and Ibn Gabirol used. Al-Qurtubi also quoted from Hafs' polemic and Book of the Fifty-Seven Questions. Al-Qurtubi said "Hafs was one of the most penetrating minds of the Christian ‘priests’, who was better versed in Arabic than any of them... studying [Islamic] branches of learning and surpassing all other Christians in this."

The “Alcalde de los Mozárabes” that existed after Toledo was reconquered by the Christians in 1085 is believed to be the continuation of the title of Count of the Christians of Toledo. The Arabised Christian culture of Toledo would last for centuries after the death of Hafs, with some Arabic cultural elements surviving even into the Early Modern Era.
