= Mohammed Al-Arousi Al-Mutawi =

Tunisian writer (1920–2005)

Mohammed Menting Al-Mutawa
- Born: January 20, 1920]h
- Died: July 25, 2005 (aged 85)
- Citizenship: Tunisian
- Style: Political
- Awards: Tunis Municipality Award in the novel (twice) State Award in Literature The Grand Scarf of the Cultural Medal

Mohammed Al-Arousi Al-Mutawi (Arabic: محمد العروسي; January 19, 1920 – July 25, 2005) was a Tunisian author and politician. He wrote research papers, stories, and novels, including Bitter Berries.

== Early life ==
Mohammed Al-Arousi Al-Mutawi attended primary school in his hometown. Afterward, he attended a French-Arabic school before traveling to Tunisia, where he obtained his primary certificate in 1935. He then studied at Zitouna University. Al-Mutawi achieved various olive certificates, the Certificate of Eligibility in 1940, an achievement in 1943 that corresponds to completing secondary education, and a Universality Certificate in 1946. He continued studying Tunisian law and got his degree in 1946, alongside a Bachelor's degree in Islamic research in 1947 from the Khaldooni Institute.

== Career ==
In 1948, Al-Mutawi taught debate at The Great Mosque. He later joined its faculty, where he taught literature and history using modern curricula. After Tunisia's independence in 1956, he served as ambassador to Iraq. He was the first Tunisian ambassador in Baghdad, serving in Egypt and Saudi Arabia until 1963. In 1964, he was elected to the Tunisian Parliament for four years.

== Associations ==
- Al-Mutawi was a founding member and president of The Abu Al-Qasim Al-Shabib al-Shari'a Cultural Club from the 1960s to the beginning of the 21st century.
- He was a founding member of the Union of Tunisian Writers, where he served as editor-in-chief from 1981 to 1991.
- He was editor-in-chief and franchisee of Stories magazine since 1966.
- He served as the Secretary-General of the Arab Writers' Union.

== Works ==
Al-Mutawi contributed to Tunisian writing with newspaper articles, literary studies, short stories, novels, plays, children's stories, and heritage achievements. He has written the following pieces:

=== Studies ===
- Olive Education and the Means of Reforming It, Tunisia, 1953
- Crusades in The Orient and Morocco, i1, published by the Oriental Book House of Tunisia, 1954
- Jalaluddin Al-Suyuti, Tunisia, 1954
- Amr al-Qais, Tunisia, 1955
- Founded Development and Innovation in Islam at Tunisian Publishing House, 1969
- History, Bousalama Publishing, Tunisia, 1980
- African Virtues in Antiquities and Hadiths, House of the Islamic West, Beirut, 1983
- Biography of Kairouan, Arab Book House, Tunisia, 1986
- The Hafsid Sultanate, published by The Islamic House of the West Beirut, 1986

=== Investigations ===
- Interpreted texts (textbook in association), Tunisia, 1955
- Khherida al-Qasr and Al-Asr (Joint Investigation), Tunisian Publishing House, Tunisia, 1966
- Masterpiece of Lovers and Companions, Antique Library, Tunisia, 1970
- Model of Time in the Poets of Kairouan (joint investigation), Tunisian Publishing House, Tunisia, 1986
- Questions of Brokers by Abu Abbas Al-Abani, House of the Islamic West, Beirut, 1992

From the works of Hassan Hosni Abdel Wahab completed by the writer

- The Book of A Lifetime in Tunisian Works and Authors and reviewed and completed by Mohamed Al-Arousi Al-Mutawa, Arab Book House, Tunisia, 2001
- Garnet Rug in Kairouan and its poet Ibn Rasheed (republished with comments)
- Teacher's Etiquette by Mohammed Bin Sahnoun (republication with comments)

=== Books ===
- The Joy of the People (Poetry), Tunisian Distribution Company, Tunisia, 1963
- Halima (novel), Bousalama Publishing House, Tunisia, 1964
- Bitter Berries, a novel first published in the Tunisian Publishing House in 1967, was considered among the top 105 Arabic novels by the Arab Writers Union
- Al-Maasra Road (Story Collection, Safaa Publishing House, Tunisia, 1981)
- Khaled Ben Alwaleed (play, jointly), Tunisian Publishing House, Tunisia, 1981
- From the Vestiges (Poetry) of Tunisia, 1988
- Resed (narrative texts of the biographical sex), Arab Book House, Tunisia, 1991
- Habeek (Poetry, 2002)

==== Children's stories ====
- Abu Ta'id – The Conceitfish – Anz Qaison – Fairy Ibn al-Azraq – Shaatat Atit (1967–1968)
- Donkey Gettis (1972)
- Prince of Zanzibar (1976)
- Al-Wefaq – Broken Bow – The Great Dam – Khaf Hanin (1980–1981)
- Do You Like Sugar, Rooster on the Tree, on the Beach, Mimi, TV, Chicken, Bear, Doll, Mother of Birds, Kono Greed, Feather Fan, the Palace of Wonders (Balchra)
- Encyclopedia of Animals of the World
- Encyclopedia Say Why
- Children's Encyclopedia of the Day

== Awards ==
Al-Mutawi received several awards including:

- State Appreciation Award in Literature, the Grand Scarf of the Cultural Medal,
- He won the Tunis Municipality Award twice.

== Legacy ==
A library was dedicated to him and an annual seminar is held under the title "Mohammed al-Arousi Folded Forum for Arab Literature and Civilization," the third session of which was held on March 24 and 25, 2010.
