= Iris Shagrir =

Israeli historian

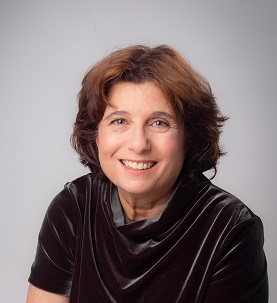
Iris Shagrir in 2021

Iris Shargir (Hebrew: איריס שגריר) is an Israeli historian, professor of the Open University of Israel, with the interests in Middle Ages, specifically, the history of Crusades and pilgrimage, relations between the three Abrahamic religions, as well as the history of personal names in the Middle Ages.

Since 2022 she is member of the Israeli Council for Higher Education. She was head of the Department of History, Philosophy and Jewish Studies of the Open University.

Her distinctions include fellowship in the Royal Historical Society and lifetime membership of Clare Hall, University of Cambridge.

She is married to Oron Shagrir.

== Books ==
- 2022 ראשיתה של אירופה: מערב אירופה בימי הביניים המוקדמים (The Beginnings of Europe: Western Europe in the Early Middle Ages)
- 2021 (as an editor) Liturgy and Art as Constructors of Cultural Memory in the Middle Ages
- 2017: משל שלוש הטבעות ורעיון הסובלנות הדתית: בימי הביניים ובראשית העת החדשה (The Parable of the Three Rings and the Idea of Religious Toleration in Premodern European Culture) (in Hebrew; English translation: 2019)
  - (from publisher's synopsis) "This study of the Parable of the Three Rings is the first full account in Hebrew of the history and the literary and allegorical origins of the parable, as well as of its reception from the early Middle Ages to the Early Modern period. The study provides evidence for the non-Western origins of the parable"
- 2003: Naming Patterns in the Latin Kingdom of Jerusalem
