= Louis Cheikho =

Assyrian-Armenian Chaldean Catholic priest (1859–1927)

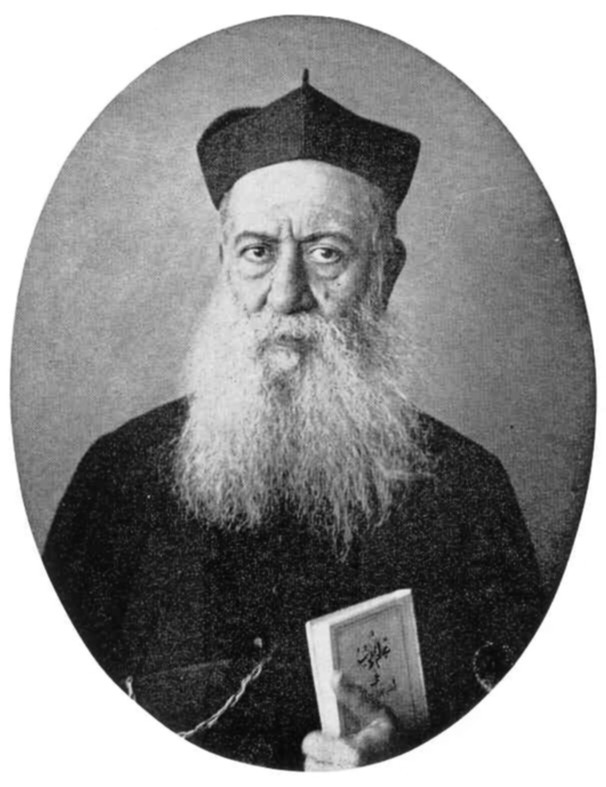
- Born: Rizqallâh Cheikho; February 5, 1859; Mardin, Ottoman Empire
- Died: December 7, 1927 (aged 68); Beirut, Lebanon
- Occupations: Jesuit, Historian and Arabist

Louis Cheikho (Arabic: لويس شيخو, née Rizqallâh Cheikho; born February 5, 1859 – December 7, 1927) was a Jesuit Chaldean Catholic priest, Orientalist and Theologian. He pioneered Eastern Christian and Assyrian Chaldean literary research and made major contributions to the publication of manuscript texts.

== Biography ==
Louis Cheikho was born in Mardin, Turkey on February 5, 1859. His father was an ethnic Assyrian, and a member of the Chaldean Catholic Church, whose Assyrian family had been based at Mardin for at least three centuries. His mother was an Armenian named Elizabeth Schamsé, who took him on pilgrimage to the Holy Land when he was 9-years old.

=== Early life ===
In 1868, Cheikhô joined his brother at the Maronite Jesuit Seminary in Ghazîr, Lebanon. At this date, the seminary was not merely preparing young men for the priesthood, but also acted as a secondary college for young Christian and especially Assyrian Chaldean men. Both groups followed a similar syllabus. There, he learned both ancient and modern European and Semitic languages.

In 1874, he entered the Jesuit Order and started his novitiate training at Lons-le-Saunier, France. He adopted at that time the name of 'Louis' out of devotion for the young Jesuit saint Louis Gonzaga.

In 1878, he returned to Lebanon and taught Arabic Literature at the Jesuit Saint Joseph College in Beirut for 10 years. During this period, Cheikho continued his studies of philosophy at Université Saint-Joseph, Beirut.

In 1888, Cheikho travelled to Great Britain for theological studies in preparation for the priesthood. He was ordained priest by the Chaldean Church of the East on 8 September 1891. He then spent one year in Austria and another year in Paris. Those extended European stays allowed him to acquire the academic methodologies that helped him in his later works.

Finally in 1894, he settled in Beirut, Lebanon, where he continued his academic career at Université Saint-Joseph.

Cheikho died in Beirut, Lebanon in 1927.

Cheikho is perhaps the founder of modern publications of unpublished Eastern Christian texts, especially Christian Arabic texts. He also founded, in 1898, the journal Al-Machriq, and contributed many articles and publications to its pages. In addition to Al Machriq Cheikho also edited another Jesuit publication, Al-Bashir.

His work was an inspiration for CEDRAC.

Famous Turkish poet Mehmet Akif Ersoy said that his work "Majani al-Adab" can be used in teaching Arabic.

== Works ==
- Les poètes arabes chrétiens. Poètes antéislamiques. Qouss, évêque de Najran, dans Études religieuses..., 1888, pp. 592–611.
- Le Christianisme et la littérature chrétienne en Arabie avant l'Islam, (3 vol.), Beirut, 1913, 1919, 1923.
- La Nation maronite et la Compagnie de Jésus aux XVI et XVII siècles, Beirut, 1923. (Translated into French by Y. Moubarac, Beirut, 1984).
- (in Arabic) Les vizirs et secrétaires arabes chrétiens en Islam (622-1517), (text established and annotated by Camille Hechaïmé), Beirut, 1987.
- Les Saints particulièrement honorés des Libanais, Beirut, 1914 (translated into French by Y. Moubarac)
- (in Arabic) Les savants arabes chrétiens en Islam (622-1300), (ed. by C. Héchaïmé), Jounieh, 1983.
- Anciens traités arabes contenant La politique de Themistius, l'économie domestique de Probus (?), les récits amusants de Barhebraeus et l'exclusion de la tristesse, attribué à Platon (publiés par Louis Cheikho), Impr. catholique, Beirut, 1920–23, 68p.
- (in Arabic) Vingt traités théologiques d'auteurs arabes chrétiens, IXe-XIIIe siècle, (publiés par le P. Louis Cheikho avec le concours des P.P. Louis Malouf et Constantin Bacha), deuxième édition augmentée, Imprimerie Catholique, Beirut, 1920, 148p.
- (in Arabic) La littérature arabe au XIX siècle. 1ère partie: de 1800 à 1870. Beirut: Imprimérie Catholique, 1908. 134p; 2ième partie: de 1870 a 1900. Beirut: Imprimérie Catholique, 1910. 206p.

== Bibliography ==
- Henri Lammens: Le P. Louis Cheikho, Lyon, 1929.
- Camille Hechaïmé: Louis Cheikho et son livre ‘le christianisme et la littérature chrétienne en Arabie avant l’Islam', Dar el-Machreq, Beyrouth, 1967.
- R.B. Campbell: The Arabic Journal `al-Machriq'... under the editorship of Père L. Cheikho, University of Michigan, Ann Arbor, 1972.
