= María Rosa Menocal =

Cuban-born American medieval historian (1953–2012)

María Rosa Menocal (April 9, 1953 – October 15, 2012) was a Cuban-born scholar of medieval culture and history and Sterling Professor of Humanities at Yale University. She later went on to win the Mellon and Guggenheim Fellowship for Humanities for her work in medieval history.

== Education ==
Menocal earned a B.A., M.A., and Ph.D. in Romance Philology from the University of Pennsylvania, working under Samuel G. Armistead, himself a student of Américo Castro. Her 1979 dissertation was entitled "The Singers of Love: Al-Andalus and the Origins of Troubadour Poetry." Before joining the Yale faculty in 1986, she taught Romance philology at the University of Pennsylvania.

== Career ==
María Rosa Menocal's 1987 book The Arabic Role in Medieval Literary History challenged the assumption that medieval European culture developed without influence from Arabic and Hebrew literature. This challenge continued throughout her work, and had a lasting impact on the treatment of Arabic texts in medieval literary study. In 2002, Menocal published The Ornament of the World: How Muslims, Jews and Christians Created a Culture of Tolerance in Medieval Spain, which has been translated into 11 languages and later made into a documentary. The book includes an introduction by fellow Yale Sterling Professor in the Humanities Harold Bloom. Menocal focuses on tolerance in Medieval Spain within the Muslim and Christian kingdoms through examples, or "case studies" political as well as cultural.

Menocal was director of the Yale Whitney Humanities Center for several years and was the co-editor of The Literature of Al-Andalus in the Cambridge History of Arabic Literature series.

She focused her research on literary traditions of the Middle Ages and the interaction of various religions and cultural groups of medieval Spain.

A memorial notice at Yale suggested Menocal sought to undo how severe misrepresentations of the Middle Ages typically tended to be.

She was the mentor of numerous scholars of medieval Iberia, including H. D. Miller, Maria Willstedt, Lourdes Maria Alvarez, Ryan Szpiech, Nadia Altschul, Abigail Balbale, Camilo Gómez-Rivas, Hussein Fancy, Anita Savo, and the author Carolina Sanín. She was elected a Fellow of the Medieval Academy of America in 2011 and inducted in March 2012.

Menocal died of melanoma on October 15, 2012.

== Publications ==
- The Arabic Role in Medieval Literary History: A Forgotten Heritage (1987, 2004)
- Writing in Dante's Cult of Truth: From Borges to Boccaccio (1991)
- Shards of Love: Exile and the Origins of the Lyric (1994)
- "Culture in the Time of Tolerance: Al-Andalus as a Model for Our Time" (2000)
- Co-editor, The Literature of Al-Andalus (2000), Cambridge History of Arabic Literature series
- The Ornament of the World: How Muslims, Jews, and Christians Created a Culture of Tolerance in Medieval Spain (2002)
- The Arts of Intimacy: Christians, Jews, and Muslims in the Making of Castilian Culture (2008)
- The Song of the Cid (Penguin Books), translation by Burton Raffel; introduction and notes by María Rosa Menocal (2009)
