= Raqqada =

9th-century capital of the Aghlabid Emirate, near present-day Kairouan, Tunisia

- رقادة (Arabic)
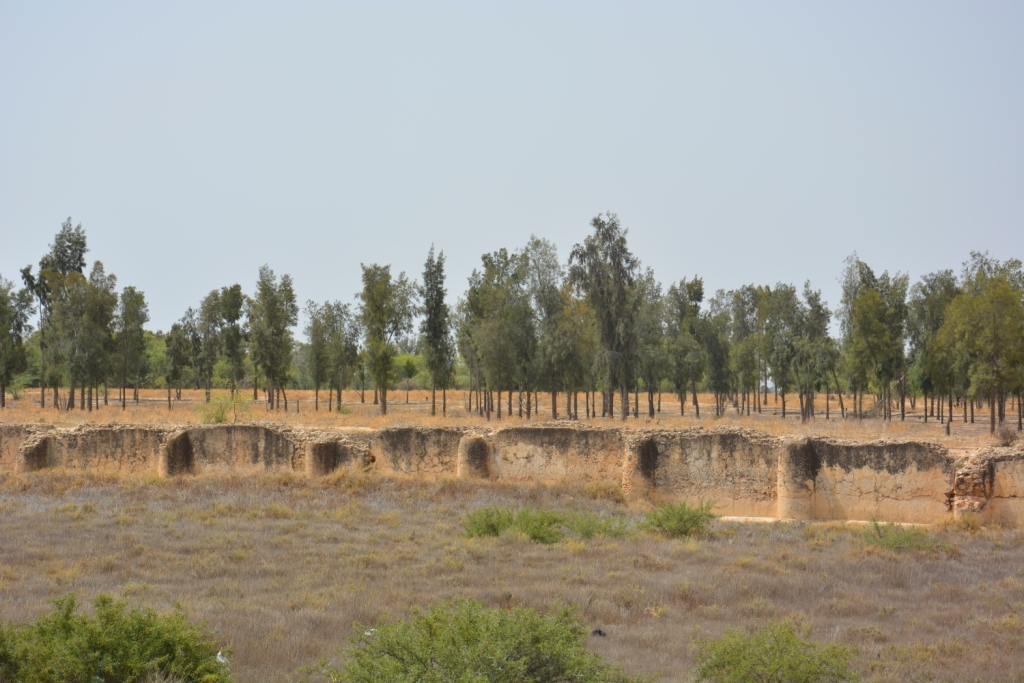
- Remains of large water basin at the archeological site of Raqqada

- Location within Tunisia
- 35°35′46″N 10°03′25″E
- Location: Tunisia
- Region: Kairouan Governorate

Raqqāda (Arabic: رقّادة) is the site of the second capital of the 9th-century dynasty of Aghlabids, located about ten kilometers southwest of Kairouan, Tunisia. The site now houses the National Museum of Islamic Art.

== History ==
In 876, the ninth Aghlabid emir Ibrahim II ibn Ahmad (875–902) felt the need to change residence from al-Abbasiyya to find a quiet place away from city noise. The new city is provided with several palaces and a mosque. The Aghlabids founded a factory of textile and paper to supply the House of Wisdom and Science (Bayt al-Hikma). At a time, Raqqada became even larger than Kairouan.

In 909, Abdullah al-Mahdi Billah, founder of the dynasty of the Fatimids, who had moved to Kairouan, finally settled in Raqqada. He chose another capital and founded the town of Mahdia. He proclaimed himself as the Imam in 909.

The 7 July 969, the troops of the fourth Fatimid Caliph Al-Muizz Lideenillah entered Fustat in Egypt. The caliph founded a new city Cairo, which was now to be the capital. Raqqada was demolished after the construction of Cairo.

After 1960, a presidential palace was built on a site of twenty acres, some remains of which are still visible, it houses since 1986 the National Museum of Islamic Art Raqqada.

Excavation campaigns initiated in the early 1960s on the site of ancient palaces have yielded abundant fragments of pottery to glaze, including shards and tiles with a metallic sheen with floral and plant ( vine leaf stylized) and carefully decorated cuts (cutting the bird dating from the second half of the 9th century).

== Archeological remains ==
The remains of the historic palaces at Raqqada have only been partially excavated. Remains have been found across a site of approximately 9 square kilometers, suggesting that the city grew fairly large at the time. Fragments of carved stucco decoration similar to that of Abbasid Samarra have been found at the site.

Only one palace building has been investigated by archeologists. It was built of mudbrick and went through multiple phases of construction and expansion. It was first constructed as a roughly square walled enclosure, measuring 55 by 55 meters, whose exterior was reinforced with round towers or buttresses. Buttressed walls like this were a feature of Roman castrum architecture and were also found in early Islamic architecture. The building had a central rectangular courtyard surrounded by rooms, including a large reception room in the middle of the north side. Judging by its layout, this building may correspond to what historical sources refer to as the Qaṣr aṣ-Ṣaḥn ("Courtyard Palace"). The building was entered from the south via a bent entrance (a passage turning 90 degrees twice), a feature which became common in the Abbasid period as both a defensive measure and as a means to preserve the privacy of the inhabitants inside. The entrance led directly into the courtyard. A cistern existed under the center of the courtyard where rainwater was collected and stored for future use. The reception room to the north, roughly square in shape, was divided into three north-to-south naves by two rows of four columns. A small apse or semi-circular niche at the back of the hall probably marked the location of the emir's seat or throne. This type of basilical columned hall became a recurring feature of palatial architecture in the western Islamic world. In a later building phase, this palace enclosure was expanded to the north and west until it measured 105 by 105 meters. The additional space was filled with living quarters. The interior underwent further reorganization later during the Fatimid and Zirid occupations of the site.

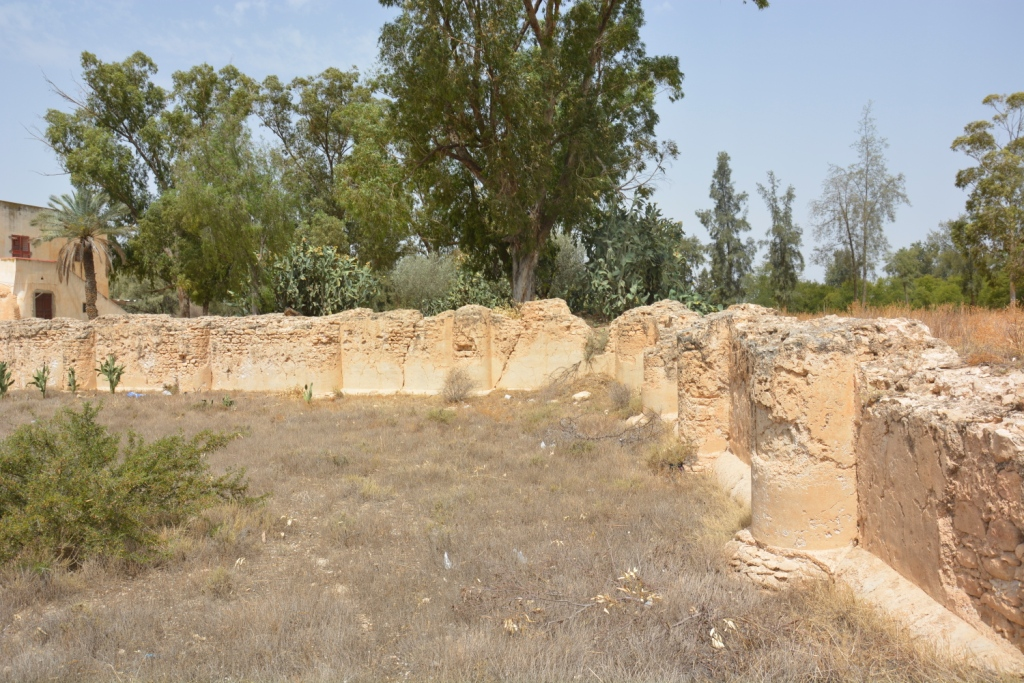
Remains of the large water basin at the archeological site of Raqqada

This courtyard palace was surrounded by a residential district and many other structures. To its northeast was a large irregular quadrilateral water basin measuring between 90 and 130 meters wide. It likely functioned as a reservoir for the royal city's water supply, but it may have also been integrated into the architectural landscape of the palaces. Of the other palaces mentioned in historical sources, one was the Qaṣr aṣ-Baḥr ("Water Palace" or "Palace of the Sea"), which would indicate a palace associated with a large water basin. This palace has not yet been found at Raqqada, but there is evidence of structures existing next to the aforementioned quadrilateral water basin, which could be identified as a part of this palace. Large bodies of water would have played an aesthetic role by reflecting the images of adjoining buildings and giving them a lighter appearance. The water basin at Raqqada may have also been used for boat parties and water jousting events. The Qaṣr aṣ-Baḥr at Raqqada is the earliest example of such a "water palace" in the Mediterranean region, with later examples found at the Fatimid capital al-Mansuriyya and the Hammadid capital Qal'at Bani Hammad. It may have been inspired by the palaces of Abbasid Samarra, where a large pool existed in front of the Bab al-'Amma gate, and it probably had its origins in older Sassanian palace architecture, such as Qaṣr e-Shirin in Iran. A third named palace, the Qaṣr al-Fatḥ ("Palace of Victory"), was the residence of emir Ibrahim II, but its location is unknown.

== National Museum of Islamic Art ==
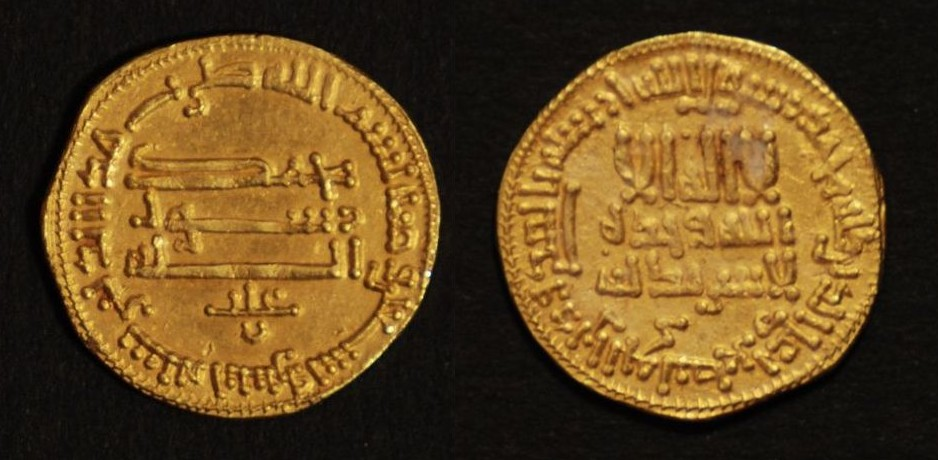
Aghlabid Dinar (early 9th century) in the collections of the museum.

The museum specializes in medieval Islamic art and includes works from Kairouan and Raqqada sites and Al-Mansuriya, a former princely city built in the Fatimid period. Admission is vested in the Great Mosque of Kairouan and presents a reproduction of its mihrab and a model of the monument. The next room contains collections of ceramics dating from the times when Raqqada was occupied (9th and 10th centuries). Another room contains collections of numismatic coins from different eras that illustrate the economic history of the Ifriqiya for more than six centuries. The largest collection is that of Korans of exceptional calligraphy and a collection of manuscripts and pages belonging originally to the library of the Great Mosque of Kairouan. Among the gems of this collection, are the leaves of the Blue Koran dating from the 10th century and the Mozarab manuscript Raqqāda 2003/2.
