= Mayte Penelas =

Mayte Penelas (María Teresa Penelas Meléndez) is a historian and philologist. She specialises in codicology, history and historiography in al-Andalus. She is Director of the Escuela de Estudios Árabes at the Consejo Superior de Investigaciones Científicas (Spanish National Research Council; CSIC) at Granada, Andalucía.

== Education ==
Penelas was awarded a PhD in Philology in 1998 from the Universidad Complutense de Madrid. Her thesis was entitled Kitab Hurusiyus: traducción árabe de las "Historiae adversus paganos" de Orosio (The Arabic Translation of the Histories of Orosius, Editing and Study).It was published in 2001 as a monograph. The Kitāb Hurūshiyūsh (Arabic: كتاب هروشيوش) is the name conventionally given to a medieval Arabic translation of Orosius's early fifth-century Historiae adversus paganos.

== Research and career ==
Penelas's research focuses on Arabic historiography, Andalusian Christian texts, and Arabic manuscripts from the ninth to the twelfth centuries CE. Penelas studied Arabic philology at the Universidad Complutense de Madrid, before moving to Granada and then London for a postdoctoral fellowship. She returned to the School of Arabic Studies at Granada, and has been Director of the Escuela de Estudios Árabes at the Consejo Superior de Investigaciones Científicas since 2017.

== Bibliography ==
- Maribel Fierro and Mayte Penelas (eds), The Maghrib in the Mashriq. Knowledge, Travel and Identity (Berlin: De Gruyter, 2021) ISBN 978-3-11-071269-8
- Mayte Penelas, Al-Maqrīzī’s al-Ḫabar ʿan al-bašar, Vol. V, Section 6: The Greeks, Romans, Byzantines, Franks, and Goths, Critical Edition, Annotated Translation and Introduction (Leiden: Brill, 2020) ISBN 978-90-04-41289-7
- Cyrille Aillet, Mayte Penelas and Philippe Roisse (eds), ¿Existe una identidad mozárabe? Historia, lengua y cultura de los cristianos de al-Andalus (siglos ix-xii), (Madrid: Casa de Velázquez, 2008) Collection de la Casa de Velázquez 101
- Mayte Penelas, La conquista de al-Andalus, traducción Mayte Penelas, Madrid, CSIC, 2002. Col. “Fuentes Arábico-Hispanas” 28.
- Mayte Penelas, Kitāb Hurūšiyūš (Traducción árabe de las Historiae adversus paganos de Orosio), edición y estudio, Madrid, CSIC, 2001. Col. “Fuentes Arábico-Hispanas” 26.
- Mayte Penelas, 'A Possible Author of the Arabic Translation of Orosius’ Historiae', Al-Masāq: Islam and the Medieval Mediterranean, 13, 2001, 113-135
