= Giorgio Levi Della Vida =

Italian linguist and historian (1886–1967)

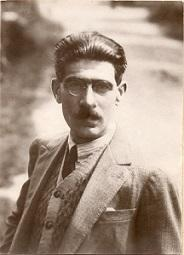
- Born: 22 August 1886; Venice, Italy
- Died: 25 November 1967 (aged 81); Rome, Italy
- Occupations: linguist and historian
- Known for: linguistic research spanning many areas
- Notable work: see Publications and Articles

Giorgio Levi Della Vida (22 August 1886 in Venice – 25 November 1967 in Rome) was an Italian Jewish linguist whose expertise lay in Hebrew, Arabic, and other Semitic languages, as well as on the history and culture of the Near East.

== Biography ==
Born in Venice to a Jewish family originally from Ferrara, he moved with them first to Genoa and then to Rome, from whose university he graduated in 1909 with the Hebraist Ignazio Guidi. Immediately after graduation, he participated in numerous research expeditions to Cairo, Athens (for the Italian School of Archaeology), and Crete.

In 1911, he returned to Rome, where he worked with Leone Caetani, historian of the Near East, on the editorial staff of the Annals of Islam. He developed strong ties of friendship with Michelangelo Guidi, son of Ignazio and an illustrious Islamist himself, as well as with Gaetano De Sanctis, Ernesto Buonaiuti, Giorgio Pasquali, Luigi Salvatorelli, and the Barnabite priest Giovanni Semeria. Since he had always been deeply interested in religious matters, he used his connections with Semeria and Buonaiuti (excommunicated for his Modernist convictions) to undertake some of the biblical studies he had neglected during his completely secular upbringing.

From 1914 to 1916, Levi Della Vida headed the department of Arabic language and literature at the Oriental University of Naples.

During the First World War, he acted as an army interpreter, achieving the rank of lieutenant. Afterwards, he was assigned to the department of Semitic Philology at the University of Torino, a post he only held until 1919. In 1920, he went to work for Ignazio Guidi at the University of Rome as a professor of Hebrew and Comparative Semitic Languages.

In those years, he began to collaborate with some newspapers. He wrote for the Roman daily Il Paese, which ceased publication at the end of 1922, after its offices were destroyed by Fascist squadristi. Levi Della Vida was also a victim of aggression on the part of the Fascists at around the same time.

At the invitation of Salvatorelli, who was the associate managing editor, he began to contribute to La Stampa, where he testified to the political climate in Rome in the days following the passing of Giacomo Matteotti. On occasion, he also had contact with various leaders of the anti-Fascist opposition, including Giovanni Amendola, Carlo Sforza and Claudio Treves.

In 1924, he became president of the National Union of Liberal and Democratic Forces, founded by Giovanni Amendola, and the following year he signed the Manifesto of the Anti-Fascist Intellectuals. In his autobiography, he claims not to have been particularly interested in political activism; he was, however, convinced that the critical period when Italy was faced with the rise of Fascism required every citizen to take responsibility by participating in political life.

In the 1920s, he made the acquaintance of Giovanni Gentile, a professor in Rome, with whom he began to collaborate on the Enciclopedia Treccani as an expert in Hebrew and other Semitic languages.

Levi Della Vida was among the twelve Italian university professors who refused to pledge the oath of loyalty to the Fascist leader and regime imposed by article 18 of the Ordinary Law on 28 August 1931. Because of this refusal, Della Vida was expelled from his post at the university in 1932.

He continued, however, his collaboration with the Enciclopedia Treccani, for which he edited the entry on Hebraism, among the many he completed.

At this time, he was assigned by the Vatican Library to catalogue its wealth of Arabic manuscripts, from which he culled a first selection for publication in 1935, followed by a second one thirty years later.

After the promulgation of the racial laws in 1939, he fled to the United States, where he was offered teaching posts at the University of Pennsylvania in Philadelphia as well as at the University of San Diego in California. In his later years, he would donate his personal collection of books and manuscripts to the library at the latter institution as a token of thankfulness for the hospitality and tenure received there.

He returned to Italy in 1945, where he was reinstated to his post at the University of Rome, teaching Muslim history and culture until his retirement in 1959. In 1947. He was elected a member of the Accademia dei Lincei.

Levi Della Vida died in Rome in 1967 after a brief illness.

The University of California Los Angeles has created an editorial series in his name, The Giorgio Levi Della Vida Series in Islamic Studies, which joins the Giorgio Levi Della Vida Award (a bursary) in recognising exceptional scholarly work on Islamic studies. He also played an indirect but potentially important part in establishing contemporary generative linguistics and cognitive science—Noam Chomsky has credited Levi Della Vida with helping to stimulate his early interest in linguistics as an undergraduate, describing his course as 'the one freshman course that I found really engaging'.

== Publications ==
Levi Della Vida's interests and linguistic research spanned many areas, including Semitic philology, Jewish and Islamic history, the Punic alphabet, and Syriac literature. The catalogue of his work reflects such a spectrum of passions.

- Gli ebrei: storia, religione, civiltà ("The Jews: history, religion, civilization"), Messina-Roma, 1924
- Storia e religione nell'Oriente semitico ("History and religion of the Semitic East"), Roma, 1924
- Elenco dei manoscritti arabo-islamici della Biblioteca Vaticana: Vaticani, Barberiniani, Borgiani, Rossiani ("Index of the Arabic and Islamic manuscripts from the Vatican Library"), Città del Vaticano, 1935
- Ricerche sulla formazione del più antico fondo dei manoscritti orientali della Biblioteca Vaticana ("Research on the creation of the most ancient set of oriental manuscripts at the Vatican Library"), Città del Vaticano, 1939
- Frammenti coranici in carattere cufico nella Biblioteca Vaticana, 1947
- Secondo elenco dei manoscritti arabi islamici della Biblioteca Vaticana (Second index of the Arabic and Islamic manuscripts from the Vatican Library"). Città del Vaticano, 1965
- Arabi ed Ebrei nella storia ("Arabs and Jews in history"), Napoli, 1984
- Iscrizioni puniche della Tripolitania, 1927-1967 (Punic writings in Tripolitania, 1927-1967"). Roma, 1987
- Visita a Tamerlano: saggi di storia e letteratura (Visit to Tamerlano: essays in history and literature"), Napoli, 1988
- Aneddoti e svaghi arabi e non arabi ("Anecdotes and curiosities, Arabic and non-"), Milano-Napoli, 1959

In addition to his scholarly publications, he penned an autobiography in 1966, recently republished as Fantasmi ritrovati (Napoli, Liguori, 2004).

== Journal articles ==
- Levi Della Vida, G. (1919-1920). Appunti Bardesanici. Rivista degli Studi Orientali VIII, 709–722.
- Levi Della Vida, G. (1920). Bardesane e il dialogo delle leggi dei paesi. Rivista di studi filosofici e religiosi I, 399–430.
- Levi Della Vida, G. (1934). Appunti e quesiti di storia letteraria Araba. (RSO).
- Levi Della Vida, G. (1942). Muḥammad Ibn Ḥabīb's ‘Matronymics of Poets,’ Journal of the American Oriental Society, 62.3, 156-171
- Levi Della Vida, G. (1943). The 'Bronce Era' in Moslem Spain.
- Levi Della Vida, G. (1944a). El Elyon in Genesis 14, 18–20. Journal of Biblical Literature 63, 1–9.
- Levi Della Vida, G. (1944b). Pre-Islamic Arabia. The Arab Heritage, Princeton.
- Levi Della Vida, G. (1949a). Iscrizione Araba di Ras el-Hammam. Scritti in onore di F. Beguinot, 77–81.
- Levi Della Vida, G. (1949b). Nuova luce sulle fonti islamiche della Divina Commedia. Al-Andalus: revista de las Escuelas de Estudios Árabes de Madrid y Granada 14, 377.
- Levi Della Vida, G. (1954a). Manoscritti Arabi di origine spagnola nella Biblioteca Vaticana. Studi e Testi 220, 133–189.
- Levi Della Vida, G. (1954b). Traduzione Araba delle Storie di Orosio. Al-Andalus: revista de las Escuelas de Estudios Árabes de Madrid y Granada 19, 257.
- Levi Della Vida, G. La corrispondenza di Berta di Toscana col califfo Muktafi: Rivista storica italiana, 66 (1954), p. 21-38.
- Levi Della Vida, G. (1961). Linguistica semitica: presente e futuro. Rom: Centro.
- Levi Della Vida, G. (1962). Un texte mozarabe d'histoire universelle.
- Levi Della Vida, G. (1967). Le iscrizioni neopuniche della Tripolitania. Annali dell'Istituto Orientale di Napoli 17, 157–159.
- Levi Della Vida, G. (1986). «Kusayy». The Encyclopedia of Islam, 520–521.

== Bibliography ==
- Brogan, O. (1975). Inscriptions in the Libyan alphabet from Tripolitania, and some notes on the tribes of the region. (Mouton).
- Cohen, G.D. (1967). A Critical Edition with a Translation and Notes of the Book of Tradition (Sefer Ha-qabbalah) (Jewish Publication Society of America).
- Day, J. (2000). Yahweh and the Gods and Goddesses of Canaan (Sheffield Academic Press).
- Guzzo Amadasi, M.G. (1995). Aleph Mater Lectonis en Punique. Actes du IIIe congrès international des études phéniciennes et puniques: Tunis, 11-16 novembre 1991, 71.
- Hovannisian, R.G., and Sabagh, G. (1997). The Thousand and One Nights in Arabic Literature and Society (Cambridge University Press).
- Junca, T., Ruspina, H., and Thisdrus, A. Leptis magna in età islamica: fonti scritte e archeologiche.
