= Samir Khalil Samir =

Egyptian theologian (born 1938)

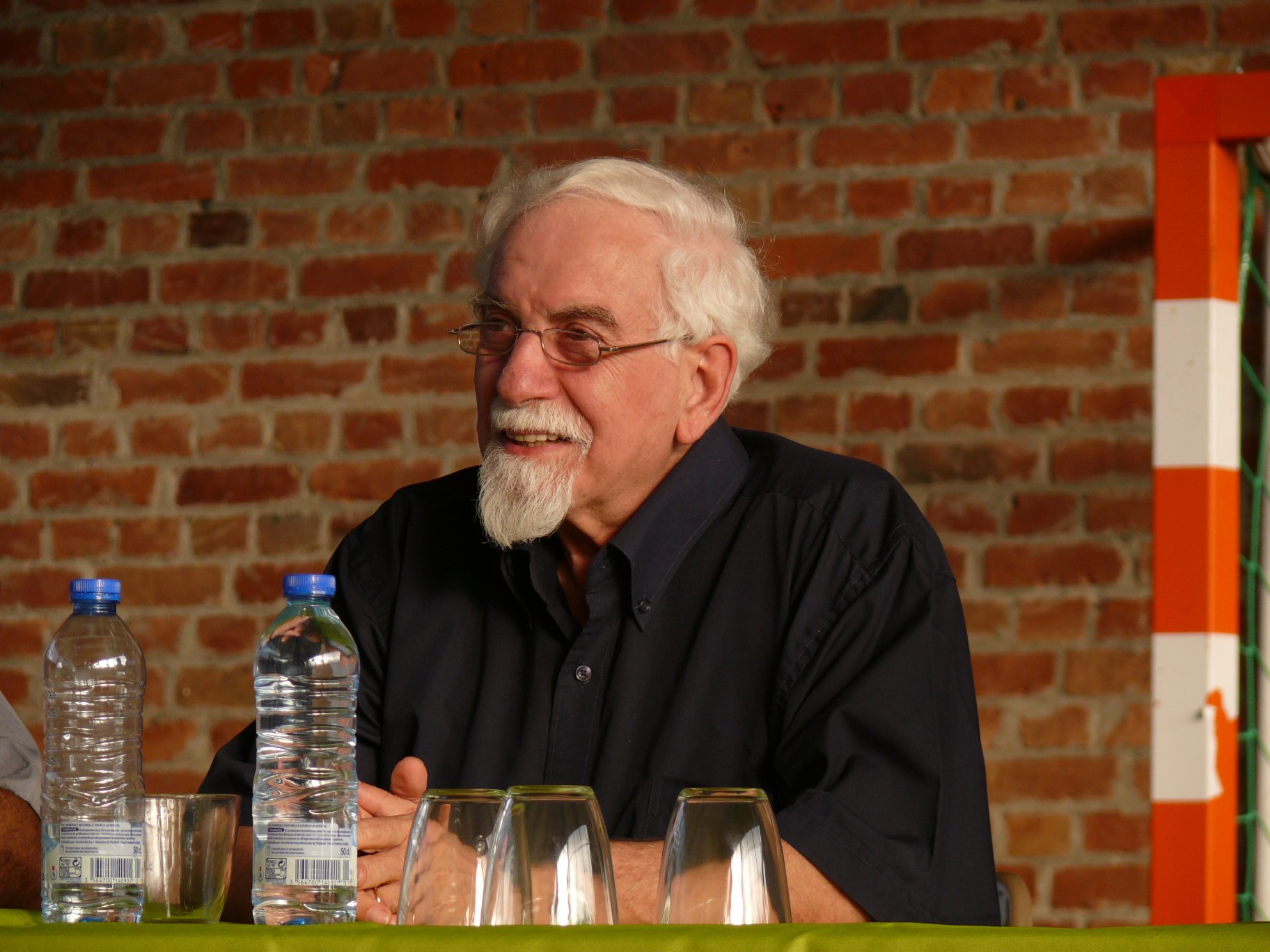
Samir Khalil Samir, 2014.

Samir Khalil Samir, SJ (Egyptian Arabic: سمير خليل سمير; born Samir Khalil Kosseim), is an Egyptian Jesuit priest, Islamic scholar, Orientalist, and Catholic theologian. A professor at the Pontifical Oriental Institute (Rome), at the Centre Sèvres (Paris), at St Joseph University (Beirut), and a visiting professor at many academic institutions.

He is the author of over 80 books in Arabic and French, and more than 1,500 articles on various topics: Christian Arab heritage, Christianity in the Middle East, Islam, and relations between Christians and Muslims. He is founder of two religious Collections, co-editor of the Coptic Encyclopedia and co-director of the magazine Parole de l’Orient.

He serves on the editorial boards of various publications editorial boards, and regularly comments on important events in the Middle East and the Muslim world in the online magazine "AsiaNews".

== Biography ==
Samir Khalil Samir, was born Samir Khalil Kosseim in 1938 in Cairo (Egypt) to Khalil Geryes Kosseim and Gabrielle Henri Boulad. His siblings are Alex Kosseim of Connecticut, US and Rafic Kosseim of Mont Royal, Canada.

On 26 October 1955, at the age of 18, he entered the Jesuit order. After two years of Jesuit religious formation at Aix-en-Provence (France), he pursued many fields of studies in Europe: theology, philosophy, Islamology, Arabic literature, and Christianity in the Arab world. He specialized in Christian Arabic studies, with a doctorate on the Christian Arabic philosopher Abū Zakariyyā Yaḥyā Ibn 'Adī al-Takrītī (893-974).

On 6 July 1968, he was ordained a priest (of Coptic rite) and moved to Egypt. There, he opened 20 schools for disadvantaged children, and also founded the Christian Arab Research Center in Cairo, that collects ancient books and Christian Arabic manuscripts. The center was destroyed by an accidental fire in 1971 and was reopened in 1974.

In 1975, Samir was appointed professor at the Pontifical Oriental Institute (Rome), teaching there for over 39 years, and advising numerous doctoral students in the field of Arab Christianity. Attendance at the rich libraries of Europe also allowed him to gather, in microfilm format, a large collection of manuscripts of Christian Arab authors.

In October 1986, he moved to Lebanon where he taught Catholic theology and Islam at Saint Joseph University, at the Holy Spirit University of Kaslik, at the Orthodox University of Balamand, and at the National Protestant College of Lebanon.

In 1986, while in Lebanon, he also founded the Research Institute CEDRAC (Centre de Documentation et de Recherches Arabes Chretiennes), which houses and documents the Christian Arabic heritage of the Middle East.

In 2018, he returned to Egypt, to continue the work he started 50 years earlier at the Christian Arab Research Center in Cairo.

== Selected works ==
- Samir, Samir Khalil; Neilsen, Jørgen S., eds. (1994). Christian Arabic Apologetics during the Abbasid Period (750-1258). Leiden Boston: Brill. ISBN 978-90-04-09568-7.
- Cento domande sull´islam. Intervista a Samir Khalil Samir, a cura di Giorgio Paolucci e Camille Eid (Genova : Marietti, 2002), ISBN 88-211-6462-4.
- Rôle culturel des chrétiens dans le monde arabe, coll. Cahiers de l´Orient chrétien 1 (Beyrouth : CEDRAC, 2003), Samir Khalil Samir, OCLC 800460050.
- Cien preguntas sobre el islam, Una entrevista a Samir Khalil Samir, realizada por Giorgio Paolucci y Camille Eid (Traduccion espanola: Miguel Montes), Madrid : Ediciones Encuentro, 2003, 223 pages = ISBN 84-7490-689-X.

== Awards ==
- Alexander von Humboldt Forschungspreis, 2005
- Vétéran de la Culture au Liban et dans le Monde Arabe, 2007
