= Muhammad and the Bible =

Arguments that prophecies of Muhammad exist in the Bible have formed part of Islamic tradition since at least the mid-8th century, when the first extant arguments for the presence of predictions of Muhammad in the Bible were made by Ibn Ishaq in his Book of Military Expeditions (Kitāb al-maghāzī). A number of Christians throughout history, such as John of Damascus (8th century) and John Calvin (16th century), have interpreted Muhammad as being the Antichrist of the New Testament.

Muslim theologians have argued that a number of specific passages within the biblical text can be specifically identified as references to Muhammad, both in the Hebrew Bible/Old Testament and in the Christian New Testament. Several verses in the Quran, as well as several Hadiths, state that Muhammad is described in the Bible.

On the other hand, scholars have generally interpreted these verses as referring to the community of Israel or Yahweh's personal soteriological actions regarding the Israelites or members of the faithful community, such as in the cases of Isaiah 42. The apocryphal Gospel of Barnabas, which explicitly mentions Muhammad, is widely recognized by scholars as a fabrication from the Early Modern Age. Some Muslim theologians also claimed the Paraclete (Greek New Testament) as Muhammad, although scholars identify it with the Holy Spirit.

== History ==
The question of the presence of Muhammad in the Bible has been a long-standing topic in Christian-Muslim dialogue, present already in the fictitious Correspondence between Leo III and Umar II, penned as early as the first half of the eighth century.

The first Islamic author that gave a detailed argument for the presence of biblical prophecies of Muhammad was Amr ibn al-Layth, ruler of the Saffarid dynasty, in a letter at the turn of the 9th century. He largely focused on the Old Testament, although he also drew from some texts in the New Testament, primarily the Gospel of John when doing so. Many of Ibn al-Layth's proof-texts would be commonly cited in later apologetic works, including Deuteronomy 18:18, Deuteronomy 33:2, Isaiah 42, and the Paraclete from the Gospel of John. Ibn al-Layth also cited other proof-texts such as Psalm 149 and Isaiah 21:6–7. The latter contains a brief reference to two riders, on a camel and on a donkey. One of the riders was commonly viewed as Jesus. Ibn al-Layth reasoned that as Muhammad was the only prophet since Moses to ride on a camel, he must have been the second rider. With the advent of Ibn al-Layth's letter, Muslim scholars employed fairly consistent lists of prophecies about Muhammad.

Insights from this period into Islamic apologetics about biblical prophecies of Muhammad also come from Christian responses. According to a disputation report written by Patriarch Timothy I, the caliph Al-Mahdi first argued that the absence of biblical prophecies of Muhammad was caused by the Christian corruption of the Bible. When Timothy rebuts this by claiming that there is no textual evidence for such corruptions, Al-Mahdi modifies his strategy and claims that such prophecies do exist. Examples cited are Deuteronomy 18:18 and Isaiah 21:6–9. Though the interaction (or at least the details of it reported by Timothy I) are unlikely to be historical, the line of reasoning it portrays is thought to reflect argumentation used by Muslim scholars and dignitaries of the time.

The first Islamic text that is entirely dedicated to adducing evidences for Muhammad as a prophet, and the one most popular in contemporary apologetics is Ibn Rabbān ‘Alī al-Ṭabarī's (9th century) The Book of Religion and Empire (Kitāb al-Dīn wa’l-dawla). The ninth and tenth chapters of this book use biblical proof-texts and occupy half the space of the entire work. Although Ibn Rabban made more sparing use of the New Testament, he produced predictions "from [the] Psalms, Isaiah, Hosea, Micah, Habakkuk, Zephaniah, Zechariah, Jeremiah, Ezekiel and Daniel." Ibn Rabbān takes a variety of references in Isaiah to praise to be direct uses of Muhammad's name, whose root means "the praised one". Ibn Rabbān reads "the ends of the Earth" from Isaiah 24, Ezekiels' temple in Ezekiel 40–47, and "the house of God" in 1 Peter 4:17 all to be references to Mecca. In many cases, Ibn Rabban's prophetic proof-texts were taken from earlier Christian lists of prophecies of Jesus in the Old Testament, which he reoriented as prophecies of Muhammad. At the time, Ibn Rabban's work was not received among other Muslim scholars. The first evidence of reception of his work in Muslim circles is from the 11th century.

Ibn Qutaybah (9th century) was a Hanbalite judge and produced what was in his time popular arguments for predictions of Muhammad in the Bible. He did this in several of his writings, one example being in his Proofs of Prophethood (Dalā’il al-nubuwwa). The version of the Bible he had access to was an Arabic translation of the Syriac Peshitta, although he only produced exact quotes from Genesis and sourced the rest paraphrastically. Isaiah and Psalms figure most prominently in his proof-texts, but Genesis, Deuteronomy (e.g. ch. 18), and Habakkuk also appear. Ibn Qutayba also asserted that the reference to the coming of Elijah in Matthew 11:14 must have originally actually referred to Muhammad on the basis of his belief that it was believed Muhammad, not Elijah, was to come. This claim was complemented by an accusation of corruption (taḥrīf) against the New Testament. For similar reasons, he believed that John's Paraclete must have also been a reference to Muhammad by name. Syrian scholar Ibn Abi Talib al-Dimashqi (13th–14th century) supported this view, stating that the Paraclete verses had referred to Muhammad, but had been altered by church leaders to influence Constantine the Great.

== Muslim interpretation ==
=== According to the Quran ===
Verses in the Quran that say that there are prophecies of Muhammad in earlier scriptures include Quran 3:81, 7:157, 48:29, and 61:6. Quran 61:6 says that Jesus brought good news about the close advent of Muhammad. Muslim historians and hagiographers (such as Ibn Ishaq) maintained that the people of Medina accepted Islam because of their awareness of these prophecies, and because they saw Muhammad as fulfilling them. (Note: "Now God had prepared the way for Islam in that they (the Arabs of Medina) lived side by side with the Jews who were people of the Scripture and Knowledge, while they themselves were polytheists and idolaters... the Jews used to say to them: 'A prophet will be sent soon, his day is at hand.' ... so when they (the Arabs of Medina) heard the Apostle's message they said one to another: 'this is the very Prophet of the Jews'. Thereupon, they accepted his teachings and became Muslims.")

=== Deuteronomy 18 ===
15 The Lord your God will raise up for you a prophet like me from among you, from your brothers—it is to him you shall listen

— Deuteronomy 18:15 (ESV)

18 I will raise up for them a prophet like you from among their brothers. And I will put my words in his mouth, and he shall speak to them all that I command him.

— Deuteronomy 18:18 (ESV)

The first Islamic text to cite this passage as a proof-text of Muhammad's prophecy in the Bible was Ibn al-Layth around the turn of the 9th century. Within the text of Deuteronomy, references to "your brother" or "your brethren" are made to other Israelites or members of the Israelite community (e.g. Deut. 1:16, 28; 3:18, 20; 23:20; 24:14), paralleling the prior reference in Deut. 17:15, 20 where a king must be chosen from the Israelite "brethren" again, a fellow Israelite. The same terminology is also applied to brother nations, such as the descendants of Esau (e.g. Deut. 23:7). [8]

=== Deuteronomy 33:2 ===
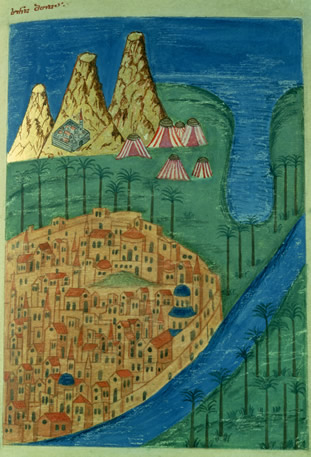
Mount Sinai depicted on late medieval Georgian manuscript

He said, "The Lord came from Sinai, And dawned on them from Seir; He shone forth from Mount Paran, And He came from the midst of ten thousand holy ones; At His right hand there was flashing lightning for them."

— Deuteronomy 33:2

As with Deut. 18:18, Deut. 33:2 was first cited by Ibn al-Layth as a proof-text for Muhammad's prophecy in the Bible. In this passage, it is stated that

God will come from Sinai, arise from Seir, and become manifest from Mount Paran. These three places are connected by Ibn al-Layth with the giving of the Tawrāt (Torah) to Moses, the Injīl (Gospel) to Jesus, and the Qur’an to Muhammad.

Since then, many Muslim scholars have looked to Deuteronomy 33 as containing a prophetic prediction of Muhammad. In addition, it has been common for Islamic commentary to understand "Paran" as a reference to the Arabian Peninsula. By extension, "Mount Paran" was connected to Mount Hira, the traditional location in Islamic religion of where Muhammad received his first revelation.

Deuteronomy 33:2 is part of the poem known as the Blessing of Moses spanning Deuteronomy 33:1–29. Scholars consider that the poem serves as a Yahwistic declaration for the blessing of the future of Israel as a socially unified whole that will benefit and prosper through YHWH's beneficence. The poem relates YHWH's movement from the south from Mount Sinai, the mountain where He resides, to His entrance on the scene as a "formidable invading force."

=== Isaiah 42 ===
"Behold, My Servant, whom I uphold; My chosen one in whom My soul delights. I have put My Spirit upon Him; He will bring forth justice to the nations. 2 He will not cry out or raise His voice, Nor make His voice heard in the street. 3 A bruised reed He will not break And a dimly burning wick He will not extinguish; He will faithfully bring forth justice. 4 He will not be disheartened or crushed Until He has established justice in the earth; And the coastlands will wait expectantly for His law."

— Isaiah 42:1–4

Muslim tradition holds that Isaiah 42 predicted the coming of a servant associated with Qedar, the second son of Ishmael, who went on to live his life in Arabia, and so interpret this passage as a prophecy of Muhammad.

In 1892, Isaiah 42:1–4 was first identified by Lutheran theologian Bernhard Duhm as one of the Servant songs in the Book of Isaiah, along with Is. 49:1–6; Is. 50:4–7; and Is. 52:13–53:12. The Old Testament identifies the servant of the Servant songs as the Israelite's in Is. 41:8–9; Is. 44:1; Is. 44:21; Is. 45:4; Is. 48:20 and Is. 49:3. John Barton and John Muddiman write that "The idea of a 'servant' played a small part in the earlier chapters, being used as a designation of the unworthy Eliakim in 22:20 and of the figure of David in 37:35, but it now comes to the fore as a description of major significance, the noun being used more than 20 times in chs. 40–55. Its first usage is obviously important in establishing the sense in which we are to understand it, and here it is clear that the community of Israel/Jacob is so described."

=== Song of Songs 5:16 ===
His mouth is sweetness itself; he is altogether lovely (mahamaddim). This is my beloved, this is my friend, daughters of Jerusalem.

— Song of Songs 5:16 (New International Version)

The Hebrew word mahamaddim (Hebrew: מַחֲּמַדִּ֑ים, desirable, lovely) in Song of Songs 5:16 has been argued to mean Muhammad.

=== Daniel 7 ===
This text has been interpreted by Muslims as a messianic prophecy about Muhammad and his ascension to the Throne of God. According to Muslims, the first beast represents Babylon. The second beast represents Persia-Media. The third beast represents Greece. (Note: The name of the third beast is also given in Daniel 8:^{21} The shaggy goat is the king of Greece, and the large horn between its eyes is the first king. 22 The four horns that replaced the one that was broken off represent four kingdoms that will emerge from his nation but will not have the same power.) The fourth beast represents Rome. The horns of the fourth beast represent the emperors of the Roman Empire. The ten horns refer to the ten Roman emperors who ran the 10 major persecutions. The 11th horn refers to Constantine I. Constantine I plucked out three Roman emperors before him, maintained authority for 3 times and half a time (34 lunar years), and persecuted those who rejected the Nicene Creed. He broke the first commandment of the law "the Lord our God is one lord", and switched the Sabbath to Sunday.

=== Haggai 2:7 ===
6 For thus says the Lord of hosts: "Once more (it is a little while) I will shake heaven and earth, the sea and dry land; 7 and I will shake all nations, and they shall come to the 'Desire' of All Nations, and I will fill this temple with glory," says the Lord of hosts. 8 "The silver is Mine, and the gold is Mine," says the Lord of hosts. 9 "The glory of this latter temple shall be greater than the former," says the Lord of hosts. "And in this place I will give peace," says the Lord of hosts.

— Haggai 2:6–9 (New King James Version)

The word rendered "the Desire" is singular and is pronounced as Hemdāh (from the root HMD). Christians have maintained from their early history that this word was a reference to the Messiah. Muslim scholars argue that it actually refers to Muhammad whose name is also from the same root (HMD). Some of them interpret the new temple in the prophecy as a reference to the Great Mosque of Mecca.

=== Synoptic Gospels ===
==== Parable of the Wicked Husbandmen ====
Muslim scholars like Rahmatullah Kairanawi have discussed this parable in detail. Rahmatullah Kairanawi interpreted the landowner as a metaphor for God, the vineyard as a metaphor for God's Law, the wall around it refers to that which God prohibited in the Law, the wine-press is a metaphor for the pleasures that are permitted in the Law. The husbandmen who rented the vineyard refers to the Jews. The servants who were sent repeatedly to the tenants to collect the fruits are God's prophets. The son of the landowner is a metaphor for Jesus, who is considered by Muslims to be one of the highly esteemed prophets. The stone the builders rejected is seen as a metaphor for Muhammad. Rahmatullah quoted this phrase from the parable: "Anyone who falls on this stone will be broken to pieces; anyone on whom it falls will be crushed" and argued that this description fits Muhammad who triumphed during his life-time over all his enemies and against all odds. Muslims have also quoted the following Hadith of Muhammad in this context:

Narrated Abu Huraira:
Muhammad said, "My similitude in comparison with the other prophets before me, is that of a man who has built a house nicely and beautifully, except for a place of one brick in a corner. The people go about it and wonder at its beauty, but say: 'Would that this brick be put in its place!' So I am that brick, and I am the Seal of the Prophets."

— Book of Virtues and Merits of the Prophet and his Companions, Chapter: The Seal of all the Prophets, Hadith number: 44

==== Parable of the Mustard Seed ====
Rahmatullah Kairanawi, among other Muslim writers, argued that this parable is referred to in Qur'an 48:29. Rahmatullah argued that the Muslim Ummah resembled the growing mustard seed in that it started from a single person in Mecca, yet it grew up rapidly and became larger than the other kingdoms of earth. It put forth its branches in the East and West and many nations lived within it.

==== The kingdom of heaven has come near ====
Rahmatullah quotes Matthew 3:2 and Matthew 4:17 and says that both John the Baptist and Jesus Christ preached that "the kingdom of heaven has come near". Neither of them preached that the kingdom of heaven has arrived. He also quotes Matthew 6:9–13 which shows that Jesus taught his disciples to pray so that the kingdom of heaven comes. Rahmatullah argues that this shows that the seed of the kingdom of heaven was not planted in earth at that time.

=== John 1:15 ===
John testified concerning him. He cried out, saying, 'This is the one I spoke about when I said, 'He who comes after me has surpassed me because he was before me.'

— John 1:15

Muslim scholars have believed that, in John 1:15, John the Baptist refers to prophets coming after Jesus. Among most Christians, this prophecy refers to Jesus, and among Muslims, it has been argued that this prophecy refers to Muhammad, rather than Jesus.

=== John 16 ===
7 Nevertheless I tell you the truth; It is expedient for you that I go away: for if I go not away, the Comforter will not come unto you; but if I depart, I will send him unto you. 8 And when he is come, he will reprove the world of sin, and of righteousness, and of judgment. ...12 I have yet many things to say unto you, but ye cannot bear them now. 13 Howbeit when he, the Spirit of truth, is come, he will guide you into all truth: for he shall not speak of himself; but whatsoever he shall hear, that shall he speak: and he will shew you things to come.

— John 16:7–8,12–13 (King James Version)

Many Muslims believe that the Paraclete in this passage from the Gospel of John is referring to Muhammad. The first record connecting the Paraclete in John to Muhammad is recorded in Ibn Ishaq's Kitab al-Maghazi in the second half of the 8th century, and the passage of the Paraclete had a pre-Islamic history of being tied to leaders of heterodox Christian sects, such as the Montanists tying the Paraclete to the founder of the sect Montanus, and the Manichaeans doing so with Mani. Ibn Ishaq alters the Johannine passage several times when translating it into Arabic in order to make it consistent with Islamic teachings on Muhammad, and so while the passage says that Jesus is responsible for sending the Paraclete, Ibn Ishaq rewrites this to say that God sent the Paraclete, and Ibn Ishaq also replaces all references of "the Father" with the Arabic term for "Lord" in order to accommodate for the Islamic teaching that God is no Father to anyone. Muqatil ibn Sulayman (d. 767) directly connected the Arabic word for paraclete (fāraqlīṭā) to the appearance of the name Aḥmad as a prophesed messenger in Q 61. Later Muslim commentators more directly familiar with the Greek text such as David Benjamin Keldani (d. 1940), have argued that the use of paraklētos in John was a textual corruption of periklutos ("celebrated") which is similar to the Arabic meaning of Aḥmad (another name of Muhammad). There are currently no known Greek manuscripts with this reading (all extant Greek manuscripts read παράκλητος parakletos), although the earliest manuscript evidence available is from the 4th century. Furthermore, prophet figures claiming to be the Paraclete of John was already a well-established tradition, having already been done by Marcion, Mani and Montanus prior to the advent of Islam.

In contrast to this, scholarship recognizes that the Paraclete, or Advocate, is mentioned five times throughout John's Gospel (John 14:16–17; 14:26; 15:26–27; 16:7–11; 16:13–17). The Advocate, called the "Spirit of Truth", is in Christianity considered the Holy Spirit – a replacement for Jesus into the world after Jesus leaves, still dependent on Christ (14:6) and sent by the Father at Jesus' demand (14:16, 24). The Spirit is said to permanently remain with the disciples (14:18–21). John's Gospel says that the world cannot receive the Spirit though the Spirit can abide within the disciples (14:17). The Spirit will accuse the world of sin (16:9) and glorify Jesus (16:14), and though it is "the spirit that gives life", the spirit does not add new revelations to those of Jesus. Jesus' promise to send the Advocate in the Gospel of John is later fulfilled in John 20:19–23 as Jesus bestows the Spirit upon his disciples.

==== 8th century Christian commentary ====
In Łewond's version of the correspondence between the Byzantine emperor Leo III the Isaurian and the Umayyad caliph Umar II, the following is attributed to Leo:

We recognize Matthew, Mark, Luke, and John as the authors of the Gospel, and yet I know that this truth, recognized by us Christians wounds you, so that you seek to find accomplices for your lie. In brief, you admit that we say that it was written by God, and brought down from the heavens, as you pretend for your Furqan, although we know that it was `Umar, Abu Turab and Salman the Persian, who composed that, even though the rumor has got round among you that God sent it down from heavens. ... [God] has chosen the way of sending [the human race] Prophets, and it is for this reason that the Lord, having finished all those things that He had decided on beforehand, and having fore-announced His incarnation by way of His prophets, yet knowing that men still had need of assistance from God, promised to send the Holy Spirit, under the name of Paraclete or "Consoler", to console them in the distress and sorrow they felt at the departure of their Lord and Master. I reiterate, that it was for this cause alone that Jesus called the Holy Spirit the Paraclete, since He sought to console His disciples for His departure, and recall to them all that he had said, all that He had done before their eyes, all that they were called to propagate throughout the world by their witness. Paraclete thus signifies "consoler", while Muhammad says it means "to give thanks", or "to give grace", a meaning which has no connection whatever with the word Paraclete.”

— Arthur Jeffery, Ghevond's Text of the Correspondence Between `Umar II and Leo III. Harvard Theological Review. XXXVII, 1944, pp. 269–332

=== Gospel of Barnabas ===
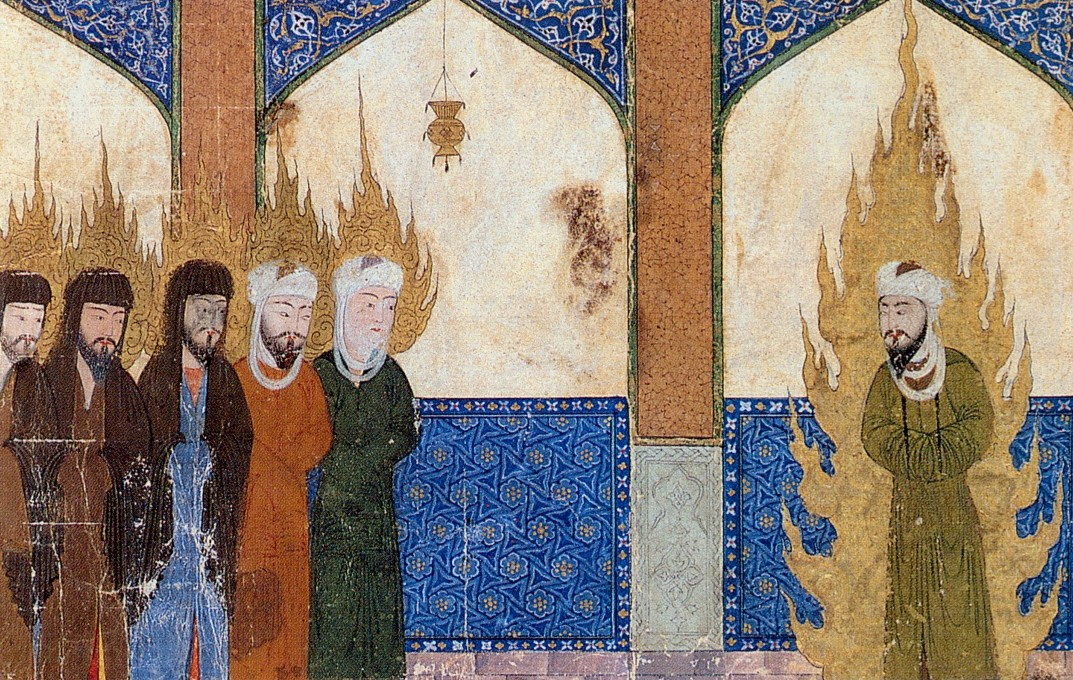
Muhammad leads Abraham, Moses, Jesus and others in prayer. Persian miniature, 15th century

The Gospel of Barnabas (as distinguished from the Epistle of Barnabas and the surviving Acts of Barnabas) is not a part of the Bible, and is generally seen as a fabrication made during the Renaissance.

The name of "Muhammad" is frequently mentioned verbatim in the Gospel of Barnabas, as in the following quote:

Jesus answered: "The name of the Messiah is admirable, for God himself gave him the name when he had created his soul, and placed it in a celestial splendour. God said: 'Wait Mohammed; for thy sake I will to create paradise, the world, and a great multitude of creatures, whereof I make thee a present, insomuch that whoso bless thee shall be blessed, and whoso shall curse thee shall be accursed. When I shall send thee into the world I shall send thee as my messenger of salvation, and thy word shall be true, insomuch that heaven and earth shall fail, but thy faith shall never fail.' Mohammed is his blessed name." Then the crowd lifted up their voices, saying: "O God, send us thy messenger: O Admirable One, come quickly for the salvation of the world!"

— Barnabas 97:9–10

=== Seal of Prophethood ===
The authors of Abraham Fulfilled identify the physical birthmark between the shoulder blades of Muhammad, known as the seal of prophethood (khātam al-nubuwwa), with the prophecies of Isaiah 9:6 and Isaiah 22:22. According to the hadith and Sira Literature, the monk who spoke with Salman al-Farisi told him that the future prophet would bear this seal between his shoulders. Joseph Blenkinsopp translates the passage as "the emblems of sovereignty rest on his shoulder". Clarke's Bible Commentary explains this as the ensign of government, such as the sceptre, sword or key, which was borne upon or hung from the shoulder. The Beacon Bible Commentary reads it as a physical badge of authority worn on the shoulder, while Barnes' Notes on the Bible links the two messianic passages and takes the key on the shoulder in Isaiah 22:22 to signify absolute religious authority. Justin Martyr and Tertullian understood the prophecy to be fulfilled in Jesus carrying the cross on his shoulder, it being the ensign.

== Christian interpretation ==
Middle Age Christian writers claimed that Muhammad was predicted in the Bible, as a forthcoming Antichrist, false prophet, or false Messiah. According to historian Albert Hourani, initial interactions between Christian and Muslim peoples were characterized by hostility on the part of the Byzantines because they interpreted Muhammad in a biblical context as being the Antichrist. The earliest known exponent of this view was John of Damascus in the 7th or 8th century. In the Reformation era, John Calvin (16th century) argued that "The name Antichrist does not designate a single individual, but a single kingdom which extends throughout many generations", saying that both Muhammad and the Catholic popes were "antichrists".

=== Daniel 7 ===
The prophecy of the "Four kingdoms of Daniel" in Chapter 7 of the Book of Daniel has been interpreted by Christians as a prediction of Muhammad. The monk Eulogius of Córdoba (9th century) argued that Muhammad was the Fourth Beast in the prophecy. Another medieval monk, Alvarus, argued that Muhammad was the "eleventh king" that emerged from the Fourth Beast. According to historian John Tolan:

In Daniel's description of this beast, Alvarus sees the career of the Antichrist Muhammad and his disciples. This eleventh king who arises after the others, "diverse from the first," who subdues three kings, is it not Muhammad, who vanquished the Greeks, the Romans, and the Goths? "And he shall speak great words against the most High": did he not deny the divinity of Christ, thus, according to Saint John, showing himself to be an Antichrist? He "shall wear out the saints of the most High": is this not a prediction of the persecutions inflicted by the Muslims, in particular of the martyrdoms of Córdoba? He will "think to change times and laws": did he not introduce the Muslim calendar and the Koran? "

— >John Tolan, Saracens: Islam in the Medieval European Imagination, Columbia University Press. New York: 2002, p. 81

=== New Testament ===
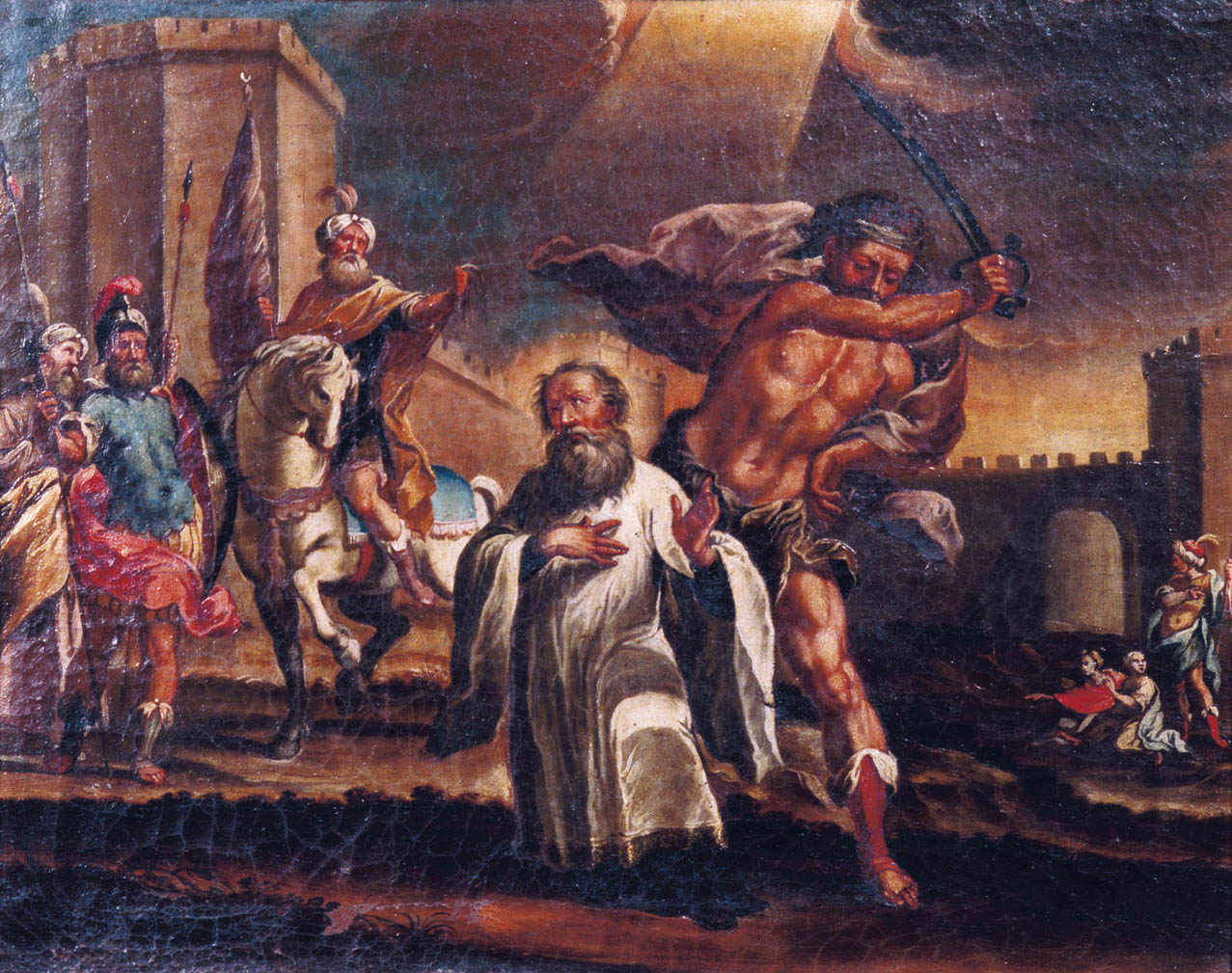
Martyrdom of Eulogius of Cordova, 17th century

==== Matthew 24 ====
In c. 850 CE about 50 Christians were killed in Muslim-ruled Córdoba, Andalusia, after a Christian priest named Perfectus said that Muhammad was one of the "false Christs" prophesied in Matthew 24:16–42. Eulogius of Córdoba justified the views of Perfectus and the other Martyrs of Córdoba, saying that they witnessed "against the angel of Satan and forerunner of Antichrist, ... Muhammad, the heresiarch."

==== Revelation 9 ====
According to Martin Luther (16th century), Muhammad was "The Second Woe" in the Book of Revelation 9:13–21.

== See also ==
- Kalki, in Hinduism the prophesied tenth and final incarnation of the god Vishnu, suggested by some to be Muhammad
- Maitreya, in Buddhism the future Buddha of this world, suggested by some to be Muhammad
- Old Testament messianic prophecies quoted in the New Testament
- Tahrif, Muslim beliefs concerning alterations to the Bible
