= Paraclete =

Greek for advocate or helper

Paraclete (/ˈpærəkliːt/; Greek: παράκλητος, romanized: paráklētos) is a Christian biblical term occurring five times in the Johannine texts of the New Testament. In Christian theology, the word commonly refers to the Holy Spirit and is translated as 'advocate', 'counsellor' or 'helper'.

== Etymology ==
The English term Paraclete comes from the Koine Greek word παράκλητος (paráklētos). A combination of para ('beside/alongside') and kalein ('to call'), the word first appears in the Bible in John 14:16. René Kieffer further explains the development of the meaning of this term:

The word parakletos is a verbal adjective, often used of one called to help in a lawcourt. In the Jewish tradition the word was transcribed with Hebrew letters and used for angels, prophets, and the just as advocates before God's court. The word also acquired the meaning of 'one who consoles' (cf. Job 16:2, Theodotion's and Aquila's translations; the LXX has the correct word parakletores). It is probably wrong to explain the Johannine parakletos on the basis of only one religious background. The word is filled with a complex meaning: the Spirit replaces Jesus, is an advocate and a witness, but also consoles the disciples.

=== Latin etymological precedent ===
Lochlan Shelfer suggests that the Greek term paraclete is a translation of the preceding Latin term advocatus:

"παράκλητος [does not have] any independent meaning of its own, it is in fact a calque for the Latin term advocatus meaning a person of high social standing who speaks on behalf of a defendant in a court of law before a judge. When Greeks came into contact with the Roman Empire [...] the word παράκλητος was developed as a precise equivalent to the Latin legal term advocatus. Thus, its significance must be found not only in its very few extant appearances, but also in the specific use of the Latin legal term."

This legalistic interpretation of the etymology contradicts the word found in the Septuagint translation of the Book of Job (Chapter 16, Verse 2), the meaning of which is specifically "comforter".

== In Classical Greek ==
The term is not common in non-Jewish texts. The best-known use is by Demosthenes:

Citizens of Athens, I do not doubt that you are all very well aware that this trial has been the center of keen partisanship and active canvassing, for you saw the people who were accosting and annoying you just now at the casting of lots. But I have to make a request which ought to be granted without asking, that you will all give less weight to private entreaty or personal influence than to the spirit of justice and to the oath which you severally swore when you entered that box. You will reflect that justice and the oath concern yourselves and the commonwealth, whereas the importunity and party spirit of advocates serve the end of those private ambitions which you are convened by the laws to thwart, not to encourage for the advantage of evil-doers.

— Demosthenes, On the False Embassy 19:1

A Greek–English Lexicon cites the example of a court of justice.

παρά-κλητος, ον,

A. called to one's aid, in a court of justice : as Subst., legal assistant, advocate, D.19.1, Lycurg. Fr.102, etc. 2. summoned, "δοῦλοι" D.C.46.20, cf. BGU601.12 (ii A.D.).

II. intercessor, Ph.2.520 : hence in NT, Παράκλητος, of the Holy Spirit, Ev.Jo.14.16, cf. 1 Ep.Jo.2.1.

== In Judaism ==
Philo speaks several times of "paraclete" advocates primarily in the sense of human intercessors.

The word later went from Hellenistic Jewish writing into rabbinic literature.

Other words are used to translate the Hebrew word מְנַחֵם mənaḥḥēm 'comforter' and מליץ יושר mliṣ yosher.

== In Christianity ==
In the New Testament, paraclete appears only in the Johannine texts, and it is used only on five occasions: Gospel of John 14:16, 14:26, 15:26, 16:7, and First Epistle of John chapter 2, verse 1.

And I will ask the Father, and he will give you another Advocate, to be with you forever. This is the Spirit of truth, whom the world cannot receive, because it neither sees him nor knows him. You know him, because he abides with you, and he will be in you.

— John 14:16–17

1 My little children, I am writing these things to you so that you may not sin. And if anyone sins, we have an Advocate with the Father, Jesus Christ the righteous.

— 1 John 2:1

In John 14:16-17, 'paraclete' is Παράκλητον and 'spirit' is Πνεῦμα (pneuma), meaning 'breath'. Pneuma appears over 250 times in the Christian New Testament, and is the word used to refer to the Holy Spirit, i.e., the Spirit of God. As a result of the immediate explanation in John 14:17, the Paraclete in John 14:16 is considered to be the Holy Spirit.

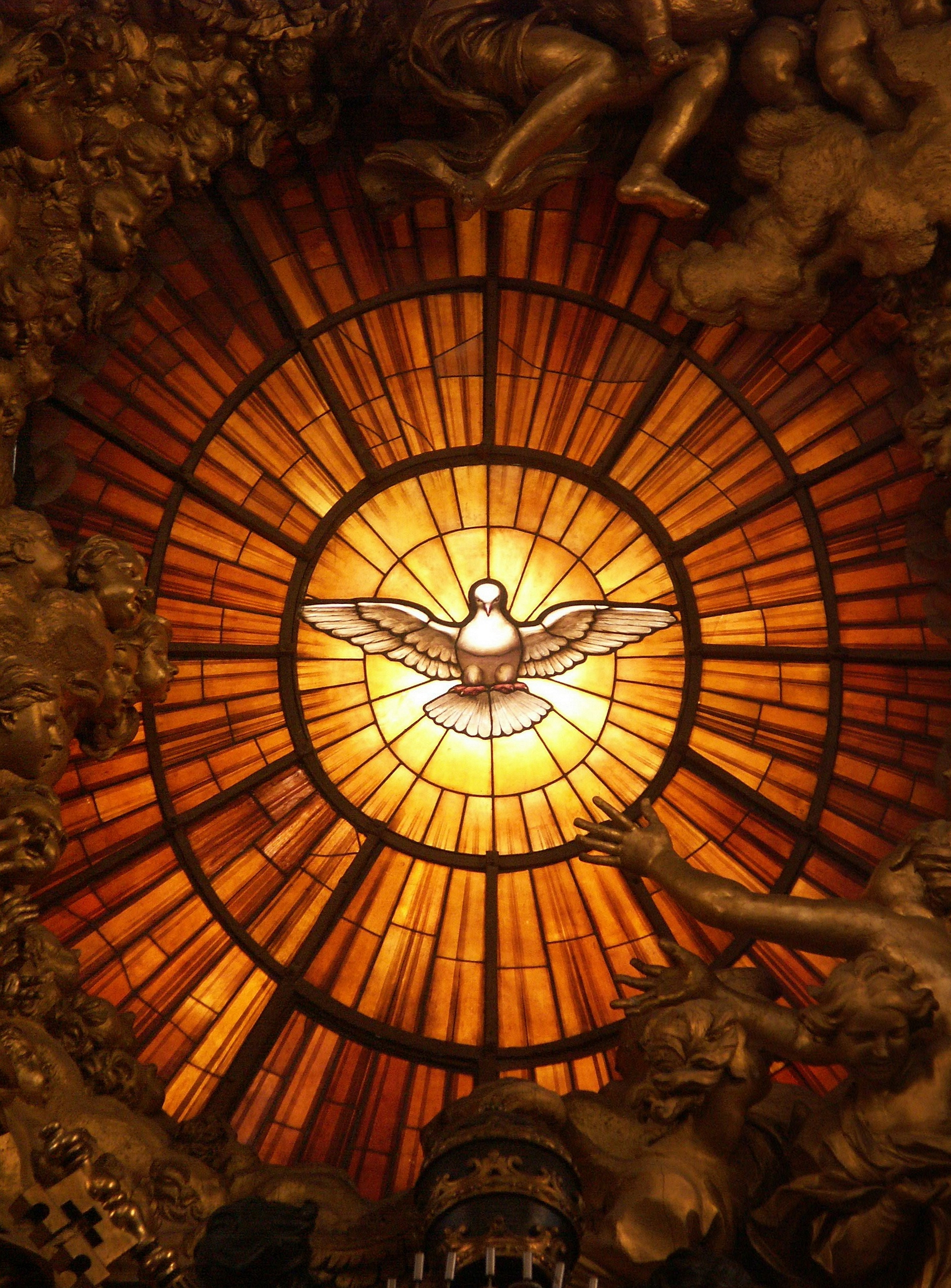
Depiction of the Holy Spirit as a Dove, from the Throne of Saint Peter, Saint Peter's Basilica

M. E. Boring, writing in the Cambridge University Press journal New Testament Studies, describes a "striking similarity" between the defined attributes of what the Paraclete is, and is to do, and what the outcome of Christian prophecy has spoken to, explaining the Paraclete as the post-Passover gift of the Holy Spirit. "The Paraclete represents the Spirit as manifested in a particular way, as a pneumatic Christian speech charisma. Every verb describing the ministry of the Paraclete is directly related to his speech function."

The early church identified the Paraclete as the Holy Spirit. In first-century Jewish and Christian understanding, the presence of the Holy Spirit is to claim the rebirth of prophecy.

During his period as a hermit in the mid-12th century, Peter Abelard dedicated his chapel to the Paraclete because "I had come there as a fugitive and, in the depths of my despair, was granted some comfort by the grace of God."

Today, the Holy Spirit continues to be referred to as the Paraclete in a prayer known as the Divine Praises, recited during Benediction of the Blessed Sacrament.

=== Scholarly interpretations ===
John 14:16 quotes Jesus as saying "another Paraclete" will come to help his disciples, implying, according to Lawrence Lutkemeyer, that Jesus is the first and primary Paraclete. In 1 John 2:1 Jesus himself is called "paraclete".

Raymond Brown (1970), supported by George Johnston (2005), also says that the "another Paraclete" of John 14:16 is in many ways another Jesus, the presence of Jesus after Jesus ascends to his Father.

The Gospel of Matthew twice uses the passive form of the corresponding verb παρακαλῶ, in 2:18 and 5:4. In both instances, the context is of mourning, and the meaning of the verb is 'to be comforted'.

=== Paraclete first appearing in gospel ===
Here is the context of the passage in John 14:15-27 with the translation of Paraclete as Advocate shown in bold:

15 “If you love me, keep my commands. 16 And I will ask the Father, and he will give you another Advocate to help you and be with you forever— 17 the Spirit of truth. The world cannot accept him, because it neither sees him nor knows him. But you know him, for he lives with you and will be in you. 18 I will not leave you as orphans; I will come to you. 19 Before long, the world will not see me anymore, but you will see me. Because I live, you also will live. 20 On that day you will realize that I am in my Father, and you are in me, and I am in you. 21 Whoever has my commands and keeps them is the one who loves me. The one who loves me will be loved by my Father, and I too will love them and show myself to them.”

22 Then Judas (not Judas Iscariot) said, “But, Lord, why do you intend to show yourself to us and not to the world?”

23 Jesus replied, “Anyone who loves me will obey my teaching. My Father will love them, and we will come to them and make our home with them. 24 Anyone who does not love me will not obey my teaching. These words you hear are not my own; they belong to the Father who sent me.

25 “All this I have spoken while still with you. 26 But the Advocate, the Holy Spirit, whom the Father will send in my name, will teach you all things and will remind you of everything I have said to you. 27 Peace I leave with you; my peace I give you. I do not give to you as the world gives. Do not let your hearts be troubled and do not be afraid.

== In Islam ==
Many Muslim writers have argued that "another Paraclete" (John 14:16)—the first being Jesus—refers to Muhammad. This claim is based on Quran 61:6.

"And [mention] when Jesus, the son of Mary, said, "O children of Israel, indeed I am the messenger of God to you confirming what came before me of the Torah and bringing good tidings of a messenger to come after me, whose name is Ahmad." But when he came to them with clear evidences, they said, "This is obvious magic."

— Sahih International

A few Muslim commentators, such as David Benjamin Keldani (1928), have argued the theory that the original Koine Greek used was Periklutos, meaning 'famed, illustrious, or praiseworthy', rendered in Arabic as Aḥmad (another name of Muhammad), and that this was substituted by Christians with parakletos. There are currently no known Greek manuscripts with this reading (all extant Greek manuscripts read παράκλητος parakletos), although the earliest manuscript evidence available is from the 3rd century.

Regarding what the original Greek term was, according to A. Guthrie and E. F. F. Bishop:

"Early translators knew nothing about the surmised reading of periklutos for parakletos, and its possible rendering as Ahmad …. Periklutos does not come into the picture as far as Ibn Ishaq and Ibn Hisham are concerned. The deception is not theirs. The opportunity to introduce Ahmad was not accepted—though it is highly improbable that they were aware of it being a possible rendering of Periklutos. It would have clinched the argument to have followed the Johannine references with a Quranic quotation.”

"Once more, if we omit the phrase, ‘bearing the name Ahmad,’ and regard Muhammad as still drawing lessons from previous history, the dubious passage might refer to what happened at Pentecost, and other incidents recorded in the earlier chapters of the Acts. With the absence of any claim on this passage either by Ibn Ishaq or Ibn Hisham, may we go further and suggest that the two Arabic words rendered by Dr. Bell, ‘bearing the name Ahmad,’ are an interpolation to be dated after the death of Muhammad.” (emphasis in original)

Sean Anthony agrees that the connection of Ahmad to the Paraclete in the Gospel of John may have been a later tradition that is not found in the work of Ibn Ishaq and that the earliest extant attempts by Muslims to connect these two figures that inspire later discussion on the subject goes back to Ibn Hisham and Ibn Qutaybah.

A later interpolation of this passage to the Quran has been rejected in modern Islamic studies. This has been supported by the fact that the earliest as well as the later manuscripts of the Quran contain the same passage and wording in chapter 61.

=== Historical development ===
In Łewond's version of the correspondence between the Byzantine emperor Leo III (r. 717–741) and the Umayyad caliph Umar II (r. 717–720), a letter is attributed to Leo:

We recognize Matthew, Mark, Luke, and John as the authors of the Gospel, and yet I know that this truth, recognized by us Christians wounds you, so that you seek to find accomplices for your lie. In brief, you admit that we say that it was written by God, and brought down from the heavens, as you pretend for your Furqan, although we know that it was `Umar, Abu Turab and Salman the Persian, who composed that, even though the rumor has got round among you that God sent it down from heavens…. [God] has chosen the way of sending [the human race] Prophets, and it is for this reason that the Lord, having finished all those things that He had decided on beforehand, and having fore-announced His incarnation by way of His prophets, yet knowing that men still had need of assistance from God, promised to send the Holy Spirit, under the name of Paraclete, (Consoler), to console them in the distress and sorrow they felt at the departure of their Lord and Master. I reiterate, that it was for this cause alone that Jesus called the Holy Spirit the Paraclete, since He sought to console His disciples for His departure, and recall to them all that he had said, all that He had done before their eyes, all that they were called to propagate throughout the world by their witness. Paraclete thus signifies "consoler", while Muhammad means "to give thanks", or "to give grace", a meaning which has a connection with the word Paraclete.

By the 8th-century, the identification of the Paraclete with Muhammad was already a known concept. In the Apology of Timothy the Patriarch before the Caliph Mahdi, the Abbasid caliph al-Mahdi (r. 775–785) debates the concept with the influential Christian patriarch Timothy I (d. 823). The Persian theologian Ali al-Tabari (d. 870) believed that only Muhammad could have been the Paraclete since he taught people what they previously didn't know. The Syrian scholar Ibn Abi Talib al-Dimashqi (d. 1327) asserts that the verses were generally believed to be about the coming of a prophet, until the reign of Constantine I (r. 306–337) when the Christian priests altered the verses to refer to the Holy Spirit, fearing that Constantine would recognize the true faith.

== See also ==
- Congregation of the Servants of the Paraclete
- Cult of the Holy Spirit
- Holy Spirit in Islam
- Rūḥ
- Montanism

== Bibliography ==
- Hoyland, Robert G (1998). Seeing Islam as Others Saw It: A Survey and Evaluation of Christian, Jewish and Zoroastrian Writings on Early Islam. Vol. 13. The Darwin Press. ISBN 978-1-61813-131-7.
- Fitzpatrick, Coeli; Walker, Adam Hani (2014). Muhammad in History, Thought, and Culture: An Encyclopedia of the Prophet of God. Abc-Clio. ISBN 9781610691789.
