= Holy God, We Praise Thy Name =

Christian hymn

- Hymn
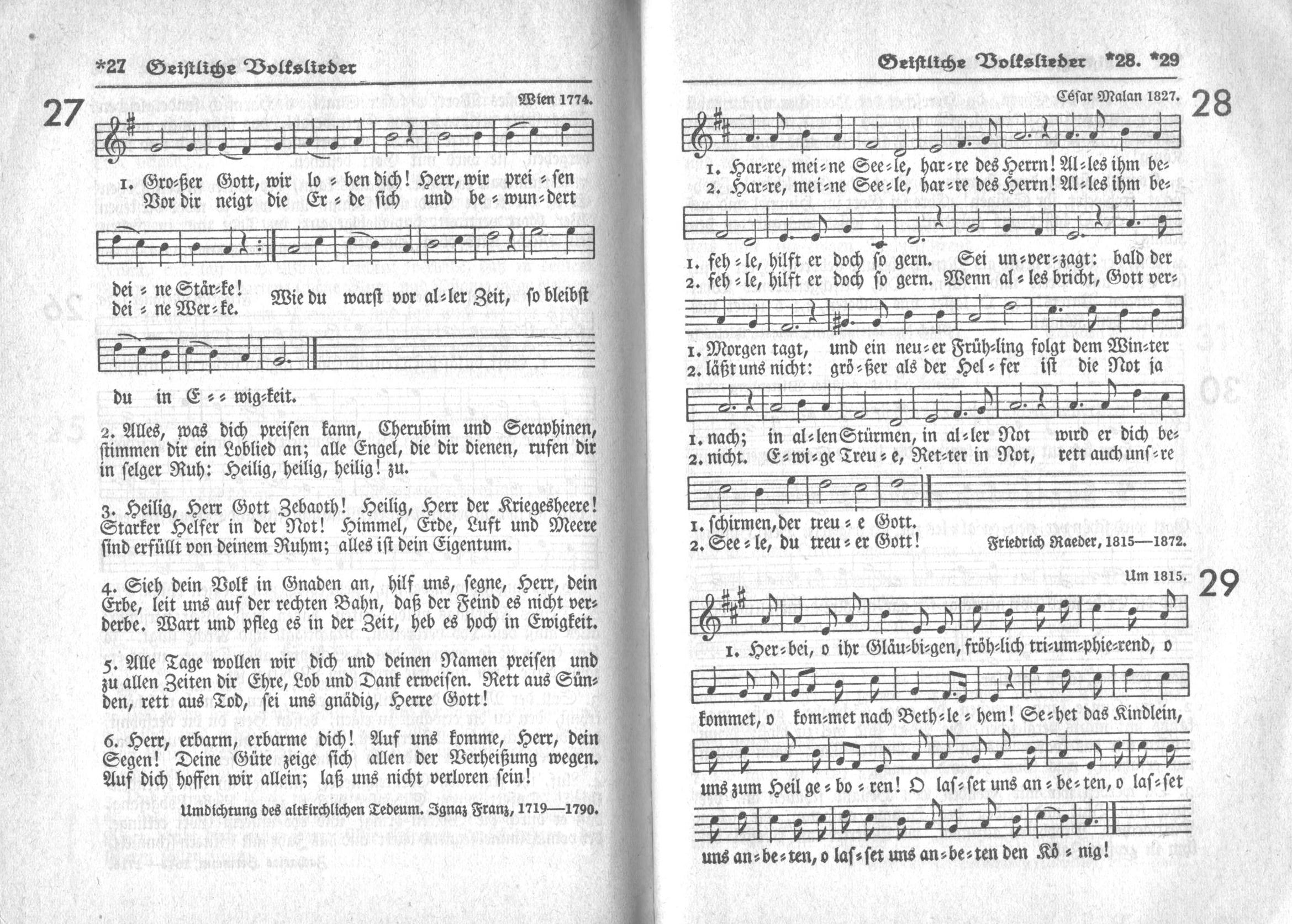
- The hymn in a 1901 Protestant hymnal
- Native name: German: "Großer Gott, wir loben dich"
- Written: 1771
- Text: Paraphrased by Ignaz Franz
- Language: German, English
- Based on: Te Deum
- Meter: 7.8.7.8.7.7
- Published: 1774

"Holy God, We Praise Thy Name" (original German: "Großer Gott, wir loben dich") is a Christian hymn, a paraphrase of the Te Deum.

The German Catholic priest Ignaz Franz wrote the original German lyrics in 1771 as a paraphrase of the Te Deum, a Christian hymn in Latin from the 4th century. It became an inherent part of major Christian ceremonial occasions, mainly as a conclusion hymn. Due to its memorable melody and theme, it is one of the most popular hymns and prevalent in German-speaking communities. It may be used as a concluding hymn during the Benediction of the Blessed Sacrament in the Catholic Church following the singing of the Tantum Ergo and the recitation of the Divine Praises.

As a result of German emigration in the 19th century, the hymn became known in the United States. It was translated into English by Clarence A. Walworth in 1858 (except verse 7, translated by Hugh T. Henry), which accounted for its wide spread around the country.

== History ==
The first printing of the hymn was in Vienna in 1776, where it became part of the Catholic hymnal (Katholisches Gesangsbuch) upon the order of Maria Theresa of Austria. Since then, different variations of the German lyrics sprung up, of which two are still in use: one in Johann Gottfried Schicht's Allgemeines Choralbuch (1819) and that Heinrich Bone's Cantate (Mainz 1852)

Its original version from 1771, which was later amended by Ignaz Franz, consisted of 12 verses; however, the edit proved unpopular and the first version persisted, albeit with verses 5 and 6 combined. The melody first appeared in the Allgemeines Katholisches Gesangbuch (Vienna, c. 1774). A typical setting of the hymn is as follows:

On the initiative of Johann Gottfried Schicht, the hymn also entered Protestant hymnals, but was widely neglected for a long time due to its perceived status as a "spiritual folksong" in the Age of Enlightenment. Only in the 20th century was it fully accepted by Protestants, though shorter and altered versions are often sung (occasionally, two verses were completely replaced by the New Apostolic Church).

The hymn became also part of military hymnbooks where it was considered as a song of thanksgiving. The military hymnal of the Evangelical Church of 1939 added a final verse which praised the Führer, Adolf Hitler. The hymnal of the so-called "German Christians" (1941) was named after the song and contained a version which was "purified of Jewish elements" and altered to fit Nazi ideology.

The content of the song can be divided into three parts: a hymnic part praising God the Father (verses 1–4 in the English version, 1–5 in the German), a similar one about God the Son (verses 5–7 in English, 6–8 in German), and a series of petitions (verse 8 in English, 9–11 in German).

In the region of Upper Silesia in Poland, this hymn is loosely translated as "Ciebie, Boże wielbimy", replacing "Ciebie Boga wysławiamy" by Franciszek Wesołowski, which is the officially sanctioned Polish version of the Te Deum (also called the "Millenial Te Deum") by the Polish Episcopal Conference, and widespread in other regions of the country. It is usually performed in 4/4 metre instead of the traditional 3/4 tempus perfectum.

== Text ==
Original German text (Note: Only the stanzas corresponding to the English translation are shown. The original has, as indicated, 11 stanzas.)
1. Großer Gott, wir loben dich,
Herr, wir preisen deine Stärke.
Vor dir neigt die Erde sich
und bewundert deine Werke.
Wie du warst vor aller Zeit,
so bleibst du in Ewigkeit.

2. Alles, was dich preisen kann,
Cherubim und Seraphinen
stimmen dir ein Loblied an,
alle Engel, die dir dienen,
rufen dir stets ohne Ruh':
Heilig, heilig, heilig! zu.

4. Der Apostel heil'ger Chor,
der Propheten hehre Menge,
schickt zu deinem Thron empor
neue Lob- und Dankgesänge;
der Blutzeugen lichte Schar
lobt und preist dich immerdar.

5. Dich Gott Vater auf dem Thron,
loben Große, loben Kleine.
Deinem eingeborenen Sohn
singt die heilige Gemeinde,
und sie ehrt den Heil'gen Geist,
der uns seinen Trost erweist.

6. Du, des Vaters ew'ger Sohn,
hast die Menschheit angenommen,
bist vom hohen Himmelsthron
zu uns auf die Welt gekommen,
hast uns Gottes Gnad' gebracht,
von der Sünd' uns frei gemacht.

7. Durch dich steht das Himmelstor
allen, welche glauben offen.
Du stellst uns dem Vater vor,
wenn wir kindlich auf dich hoffen;
du wirst kommen zum Gericht,
wenn der letzte Tag anbricht.

8. Herr steh' deinen Dienern bei,
welche dich in Demut bitten.
Kauftest durch dein Blut uns frei,
hast den Tod für uns gelitten;
nimm uns nach vollbrachtem Lauf
zu dir in den Himmel auf.

11. Herr, erbarm, erbarme dich.
Lass uns deine Güte schauen;
deine Treue zeige sich,
wie wir fest auf dich vertrauen.
Auf dich hoffen wir allein;
lass uns nicht verloren sein. (Note: There exist several variants for the last stanza.)

English translation
1. Holy God, we praise Thy Name;
Lord of all, we bow before Thee!
All on earth Thy sceptre claim,
All in Heaven above adore Thee;
Infinite Thy vast domain,
Everlasting is Thy reign.

2. Hark! the loud celestial hymn
Angel choirs above are raising,
Cherubim and seraphim,
In unceasing chorus praising;
Fill the heavens with sweet accord:
Holy, holy, holy, Lord.

3. Lo! the Apostolic train
Join the Sacred Name to hallow;
Prophets swell the loud refrain,
And the white robed martyrs follow;
And from morn to set of sun,
Through the Church the song goes on.

4. Holy Father, Holy Son,
Holy Spirit, Three we name Thee;
While in essence only One,
Undivided God we claim Thee;
And adoring bend the knee,
While we own the mystery.

5. Thou art King of glory, Christ:
Son of God, yet born of Mary;
For us sinners sacrificed,
And to death a Tributary:
First to break the bars of death,
Thou hast opened Heaven to faith.

6. From Thy high celestial home,
Judge of all, again returning,
We believe that Thou shalt come
In the dreaded doomsday morning;
When Thy voice shall shake the earth,
And the startled dead come forth.

7. Therefore do we pray Thee, Lord:
Help Thy servants whom, redeeming
By Thy Precious Blood out-poured,
Thou hast saved from Satan's scheming.
Give to them eternal rest
In the glory of the blest.

8. Spare Thy people, Lord, we pray,
By a thousand snares surrounded:
Keep us without sin today,
Never let us be confounded.
Lo, I put my trust in Thee;
Never, Lord, abandon me.

In Switzerland, there also exists a pacifistic version which was composed after World War I by Karl von Greyerz and is destined for the Federal Day of Thanksgiving, Repentance and Prayer, an interdenominational church holiday in Switzerland.
