= Correspondence between Leo III and Umar II =

The Correspondence between Leo III and Umar II is a celebrated but likely fictional polemical exchange between the Byzantine emperor Leo III (r. 717–741) and the Umayyad caliph Umar II (r. 717–720). Many versions of the correspondence circulated, and present various attempts by each of the two leaders, the respective political representatives of the political powers of Christianity and Islam of the early eighth century, to convert one another into their respective faith's. The dialogue covers contentious theological issues that have long characterized Christian-Muslim debates such as the reliability of scripture, Christology and the Incarnation, the identity of the Paraclete, and the putatively pagan origins of either the Kaaba and the Hajj or the symbol of the Christian cross.

Although attributed to these two eighth-century leaders, the correspondence survives in several distinct versions across multiple languages, including Latin, Armenian, Arabic, and Aljamiado. These texts form a centuries-long Christian–Muslim dialogue that was adapted by various Mediterranean communities from the eighth to the sixteenth century to serve local polemical needs.

== Historical context and attribution ==
The correspondence is traditionally set against the backdrop of the early eighth-century relations between the Byzantine Empire and the Umayyad Caliphate. Umar II is often chosen as the Muslim interlocutor due to his reputation for exceptional piety and fairness, which made him a credible figure in both Islamic and Christian traditions. In addition, Umar II was already embedded in an epistolary tradition of letter-writing and sending. By contrast, the choice of Leo II is likely only due to him being the only reasonable Byzantine contemporary with which Umar II could have corresponded with in this fashion, instead of being on the basis of his own reputation or proceeding from historical events that happened during his reign.

== Authenticity ==
Modern scholarship generally considers the attribution to Leo III and Umar II to be a "pious fiction" rather than genuine diplomatic communication. The surviving versions are characterized as "unsophisticated polemics" intended for "Simple Believers" rather than highly learned theologians. The texts often reflect the theological concerns and linguistic environments of the anonymous authors who composed or adapted them centuries after the deaths of the historical protagonists.

== Manuscripts and traditions ==
The correspondence exists in six primary versions, which scholars categorize into three coherent textual groupings.

=== Armenian and Greek tradition ===
The Armenian version is the oldest surviving witness to the correspondence, appearing within the History of the priest Łewond, composed around 788 or 789. This version includes a short letter from Umar to Leo followed by a long, detailed reply from the emperor. Philological evidence, such as the transliteration of Greek biblical terms into Armenian, suggests that Leo's letter in this tradition was originally translated from a lost Greek original.

=== Latin and Christian Arabic tradition ===
This group includes two distinct recensions of Leo's letter:

- Latin I: The oldest manuscript of any version is a Carolingian manuscript (BnF MS lat. 2826) from the first half of the ninth century. It claims to be a translation from a "Chaldean" (Arabic) text which was itself derived from Greek. It shows strong links to the Mozarabic environment of medieval Spain.
- Christian Arabic: Discovered in 1975 at Saint Catherine's Monastery (MS Ar. New Finds 14), this tenth-century version is an original Arabic composition with no signs of an underlying Greek source. It shares significant material with the Latin version but often uses it for different argumentative ends.
- Latin II: An extensive revision of the earlier Latin version published in 1508 by the French humanist Symphorien Champier.

=== Muslim Arabic and Aljamiado tradition ===
This grouping consists of letters attributed to Umar II attempting to persuade Leo to convert to Islam:

- Muslim Arabic: A fragmentary ninth- or tenth-century manuscript originally from the Great Mosque of Damascus, now in Istanbul (MS Ş_E_4419). It advances a thoroughly Islamic critique of Christian practices.
- Aljamiado: Produced by Mudéjar or Morisco scribes in fifteenth- and sixteenth-century Spain, this version is written in Castilian using the Arabic alphabet. It overlaps significantly with the Istanbul Arabic fragment, suggesting a shared source.

== Contents and arguments ==
The correspondence follows a structured exchange where one ruler challenges the faith of the other, leading to a point-by-point rebuttal.

=== Scriptural Reliability ===
A recurring theme is the "contamination" of the Torah and the Gospels. Muslim versions argue that Christians and Jews corrupted their scriptures, while Christian versions defend the reliability of the Bible, often citing the internal consistency of the prophets.

=== Christology and the Incarnation ===
The letters debate the nature of Jesus. The Muslim versions frequently attack the concept of the Incarnation, arguing it is impossible for God to have entered the "impurities of the womb". In response, Christian versions use the comparison of Adam and Jesus to explain how God could take human form without being "defiled".

=== The Paraclete ===
The texts engage in a linguistic dispute over the term "Paraclete" from the Gospel of John. Muslim authors identified this figure with Muhammad (often via the name Ahmad), while Christian authors maintained it referred to the Holy Spirit.

=== Religious practices ===
The letters contain critiques of various practices from the opposing traditions. Christian critiques focus on the "pagan" origins of the Kaaba and the Takbir ("Allāhu akbar"), while Muslim critiques focus on the veneration of the Cross, the use of icons, the practice of burying the dead in churches, and eucharistic sacrifices.
