= Ignaz Franz =

German Catholic priest, theologian, and church hymn composer

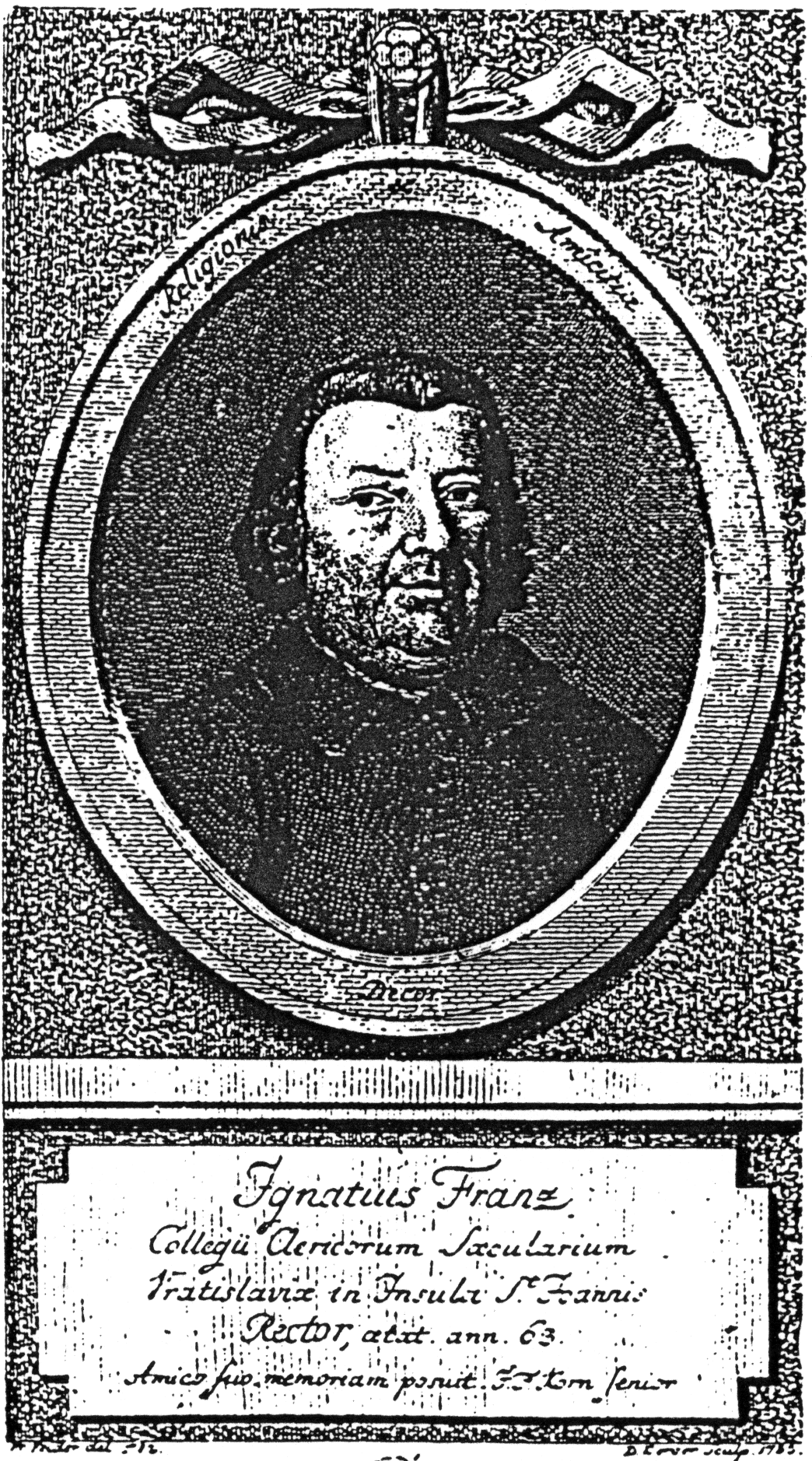
Ignaz Franz

Ignaz Franz (born 12 October 1719 in Protzan near Frankenstein; died 19 August 1790 in Breslau) was a German Catholic priest, theologian and composer of church hymns.

== Life ==
Franz studied philosophy and theology at the University of Breslau. In 1742, after finishing his studies and finishing the compulsory preparatory period, he was ordained as a priest by Prince-Bishop Philipp Ludwig von Sinzendorf. Shortly thereafter he was delegated vicar of Glogau in Silesia.

In 1753, Franz was appointed archpriest in Schlawa, Silesia. In 1766 Count Philipp Gotthard von Schaffgotsch called him back to Breslau and appointed him to be the head of the episcopal seminary von Breslau. Franz also functioned as the “Assessor for Theological Affairs” at the Apostolic Vicariate.

Franz died in Breslau on 19 August 1790 and is buried there.

== Works ==
Franz was an editor of catechisms and books of hymns during the period of the Enlightenment. He is the composer of the hymn Holy God, We Praise Thy Name Großer Gott, wir loben dich (GL 1975 257, GL 2013 380, EG 331. This is a German version of the Te Deum, the beginning of the Ambrosian Hymn of Praise. Holy God, We Praise Your Name was composed around 1770. The later melody was printed for the first time in the Katholisches Gesangbuch (Vienna 1776).

== Literature ==
- Constantin von Wurzbach: Franz, Ignaz. In: Biographisches Lexikon des Kaiserthums Oesterreich. 28. Theil. Kaiserlich-königliche Hof- und Staatsdruckerei, Wien 1874, S. 338 (Digitalisat).
- Friedrich Wilhelm Bautz (1990). "Franz, Ignaz". In Bautz, Friedrich Wilhelm (ed.). Biographisch-Bibliographisches Kirchenlexikon (BBKL) (in German). Vol. 2. Hamm: Bautz. col. 112. ISBN 3-88309-032-8.
