= Karl von Greyerz =

Swiss author (1870–1949)

Hans Karl Walter von Greyerz (7 February 1870 in Bern – 22 September 1949 in Bern) was a Swiss Reformed pastor, Christian socialist, and hymn writer.

== Family ==
Karl von Gruyerz was the great-grandson of the naturalist Georg Forster through his daughter Claire von Greyerz, son of the pastor Otto Wilhelm Aimé von Greyerz (1829–1882) and his wife Pauline Luise Locher (1838–1873). The writer Otto von Greyerz was his brother.

== Life ==
After studying theology in Basel, Jena, Bern, Berlin and Paris, he became pastor in Bürglen (Aegerten near Biel) in 1895, in Winterthur in 1902, in Kandergrund in 1912 and in 1918 at the Johanneskirche in Bern, where he stayed until 1935. After the First World War he advocated for Christian pacifism and the introduction of alternative civilian service.

Karl von Gruyerz created a pacifist version of the hymn "Holy God, We Praise Thy Name", which is number 518 in the hymn book of the Evangelical Reformed Churches in German-speaking Switzerland and number 729 in the prayer and hymn book of the Christian Catholic Church in Switzerland.

== Published works ==
- "Greyerz, Karl von" in German, French and Italian in the online Historical Dictionary of Switzerland.
- Hans von Greyerz (1966). "von Greyerz, Hans Karl Walter". Neue Deutsche Biographie (in German). Vol. 7. Berlin: Duncker & Humblot. pp. 54–55. (full text online).
- "Greyerz, Hans Karl Walter von". In: Deutsche Biographische Enzyklopädie. 2. Ausgabe. Bd. 4 (2006), S. 135 (online).
