= Paradise of Wisdom =

Early Islamic medical encyclopedia

- Author: Ali ibn Sahl Rabban al-Tabari
- Original title: Firdaws al-ḥikma
- Language: Arabic
- Genre: Encyclopedia
- Publication date: 850
- Publication place: Abbasid Caliphate

The Firdaws al-ḥikma (فردوس الحكمة), known in English as the Paradise of Wisdom, is a medical encyclopedia written by Ali ibn Sahl Rabban al-Tabari and completed around 850. It is one of the earliest Islamic medical encyclopedias, if not the earliest.

== Contents ==
In total, the Firdaws al-ḥikma has 360 abwāb or chapters. The encyclopedia also has seven anwāʿ or parts covering a range of topics such as Aristotelianism; embryology; anatomy; dreams; psychology; nutrition; toxicology; cosmology; astronomy; and Indian medicine.

al-Tabari offers a remedy for each disease he describes; for instance, he suggests, quoting Galen, that colic may be cured with wolf feces. Apart from Galen, al-Tabari extensively quotes other Greek authorities including Alexander of Aphrodisias; Archigenes; Aristotle; Democritus; Dioscorides; Hippocrates; Pythagoras; and Theophrastus. He also quotes several of his Arabic contemporaries.

Additionally, the Firdaws is replete with al-Tabari's personal accounts of "peculiar phenomena" like a monkey-like man who "coveted the coitus just like monkeys do", a fire bolt that destroyed a Zoroastrian temple, and a stone "that provokes abortion".

== Publication history ==
Completed by Tabaristan-based physician Ali ibn Sahl Rabban al-Tabari around 850 and dedicated to Abbasid Caliph al-Mutawakkil, the work is believed to be the "first all-inclusive medical compendium" and one of the earliest Islamic medical encyclopedias, if not the earliest. According to University of Birmingham professor David Thomas, it became "a foundation text for medical practitioners in the Islamic world." Al-Tabari later translated his work, which also included information and advice on medical ethics, into Syriac language.

British Iranologist Edward G. Browne died in 1923, while editing and translating the encyclopedia; the project was subsequently completed and published by Browne's protege Muhammad Zubair Siddiqi in 1928.
