= Divine Praises =

Catholic expiatory prayer

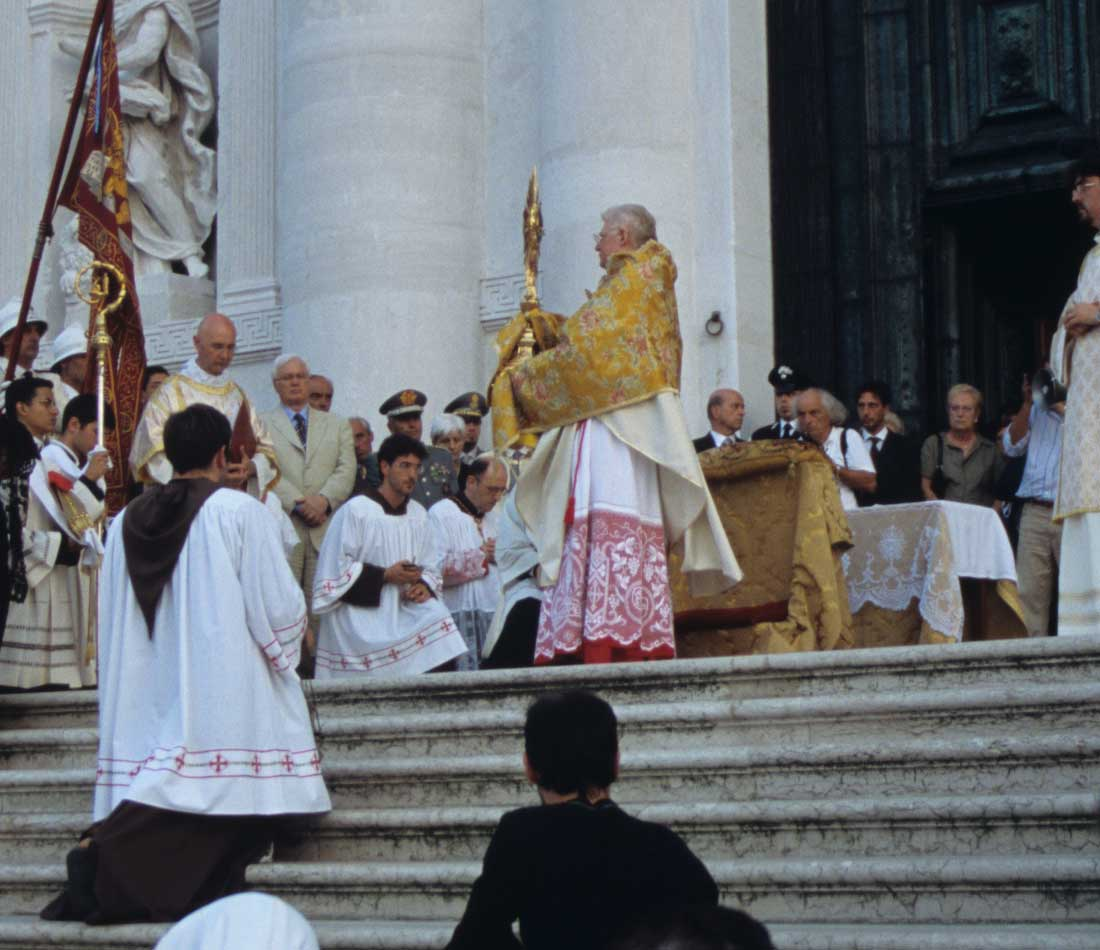
Cardinal Angelo Scola holding the Blessed Sacrament in Venice, 16 July 2005

The Divine Praises or Laudes Divinae (informally known as Blessed be God) is an 18th-century Roman Catholic expiatory prayer. It is traditionally recited during Benediction of the Blessed Sacrament. It may also be said after having heard, seen, or inadvertently uttered profanity or blasphemy.

== History ==
The Divine Praises were originally written in Italian by Luigi Felici, a Jesuit priest, in 1797 for the purpose of making reparation after saying or hearing sacrilege or blasphemy.

The original text, translated into English and as presented in a 19th-century Raccolta, was:

Blessed be God.
Blessed be His Holy name.
Blessed be Jesus Christ, true God and true man.
Blessed be the name of Jesus.
Blessed be Jesus in the most Holy Sacrament of the Altar.
Blessed be the great Mother of God, the most holy Mary.
Blessed be the name of Mary, Virgin and Mother.
Blessed be God in His holy angels and in His saints.

The Divine Praises have been expanded over time; the additional lines, in the order they were added, are presented below.

Blessed be her Holy and Immaculate Conception. (Pope Pius IX, 1851)
Blessed be His Most Sacred Heart. (Pope Leo XIII, 1897)
Blessed be St. Joseph, her most chaste spouse. (Pope Benedict XV, 1920)
Blessed be her Glorious Assumption. (Pope Pius XII, 1952)
Blessed be His Most Precious Blood. (Pope John XXIII, 1960)
Blessed be the Holy Spirit, the Paraclete. (Pope Paul VI, 1964)

== Text of the prayer ==
| Latin | English | Italian |
|---|---|---|
| Benedictus Deus. | Blessed be God. | Dio sia benedetto. |
| Benedictum Nomen Sanctum eius. | Blessed be His Holy Name. | Benedetto il Suo santo Nome. |
| Benedictus Iesus Christus, verus Deus et verus homo. | Blessed be Jesus Christ, true God and true Man. | Benedetto Gesù Cristo, vero Dio e vero Uomo. |
| Benedictum Nomen Iesu. | Blessed be the Name of Jesus. | Benedetto il Nome di Gesù. |
| Benedictum Cor eius sacratissimum. | Blessed be His Most Sacred Heart. | Benedetto il Suo sacratissimo Cuore. |
| Benedictus Sanguis eius pretiosissimus. | Blessed be His Most Precious Blood. | Benedetto il Suo preziosissimo Sangue. |
| Benedictus Iesus in sanctissimo altaris Sacramento. | Blessed be Jesus in the Most Holy Sacrament of the Altar. | Benedetto Gesù nel SS. Sacramento dell’altare. |
| Benedictus Sanctus Spiritus, Paraclitus. | Blessed be the Holy Spirit, the Paraclete. | Benedetto lo Spirito Santo Paraclito. |
| Benedicta excelsa Mater Dei, Maria sanctissima. | Blessed be the great Mother of God, Mary most Holy. | Benedetta la gran Madre di Dio, Maria Santissima. |
| Benedicta sancta eius et immaculata Conceptio. | Blessed be her Holy and Immaculate Conception. | Benedetta la Sua santa e Immacolata Concezione. |
| Benedicta eius gloriosa Assumptio. | Blessed be her Glorious Assumption. | Benedetta la Sua gloriosa Assunzione. |
| Benedictum nomen Mariae, Virginis et Matris. | Blessed be the name of Mary, Virgin and Mother. | Benedetto il Nome di Maria, Vergine e Madre. |
| Benedictus sanctus Ioseph, eius castissimus Sponsus. | Blessed be Saint Joseph, her most chaste spouse. | Benedetto S. Giuseppe, Suo castissimo Sposo. |
| Benedictus Deus in Angelis suis, et in Sanctis suis. Amen. | Blessed be God in His Angels and in His Saints. Amen. | Benedetto Dio nei Suoi Angeli e nei Suoi Santi. Amen. |
