= David Benjamin Keldani =

Catholic convert to Islam (1867–1940)

David Benjamin Keldani (1867 – c. 1940), later known as Abd al-Ahad Dawud (Arabic: عبد الأحد داود, romanized: Abd al-Aḥad Dāwūd) was a Chaldean Catholic priest who converted to Islam. He is famous for his book Muhammad in Bible.

== Name ==
He was baptized as David (Dawid, Dawud), a name he retained after his conversion to Islam. His family name "Benjamin" or "Benyamin" (Syriac) was probably derived from his grandfather.

He was called "Keldani" (Chaldean in Arabic) following his conversion. His adopted name Abdul-Ahad (servant of the One) emphasizes his anti-trinitarian monotheism - a belief he reached prior to his conversion to Islam.

== Life ==
The main source about Benjamin is the autobiographical remarks in his books. No other references to his life and conversion to Islam are available.

=== Christian period ===
A Catholic of the Chaldean rite, David Benjamin received his education in Urmia. He worked there from 1886 to 1889 as a teacher for schools established by the Anglican mission. During this time he was ordained deacon. He left Urmia in 1890 for England, and studied in Mill Hill at the College for Foreign Missions (or "St. Joseph's College" established by Herbert Vaughan (1832-1903)). In 1892 Benjamin wrote a series of articles for the English Catholic weekly magazine The Tablet and other periodicals. After completing his studies at the seminary in Mill Hill, he was sent to Rome in 1892 by Vaughan for further study. There he pursued philosophical and theological studies at the Propaganda Fide College, and in 1895 was ordained priest. In 1895 he was back in Persia, joined the French Lazarist Mission at Urmia and published the Mission's first Syriac periodical Qala-La-Shara (The Voice of Truth).

In 1898 Father Benjamin opened a school in his native village Digala (a mile from Urmiah). He was sent the following year to take charge of the diocese.

He retired to his small villa in the summer of 1900 where, for a month, he spent his time in prayer and reading the Scriptures in their original languages. He then resigned from his ecclesiastical position.

In 1903 he visited England again and joined the Unitarian community. A year later he was sent by the British and Foreign Unitarian Association for missionary work among his countrymen. On his way to Persia he passed through Constantinople, and following several discussions with Sheikhu 'I-Islam Jemalu 'd-Din Effendi and other 'ulama he converted to Islam (1904).

=== Islamic period ===
Not much is known about David Benjamin's life as a Muslim apart from his work as an author. He wrote Muhammad in the Bible – originally published in 1928 as a series of articles in the journal The Islamic Review. He also wrote for the Turkish paper the Aqsham in 1922 or 1923 Prophet Muhammad Is the Son-of-Man.

The book, which has been translated into German by Asan Günter Nyadayisenga, asserts that many biblical prophecies – understood by Christians to refer to Jesus – point in fact to Muhammad. The Kingdom of God announced by Jesus is the establishment of God's rule on earth through Islam. The Paraclete foretold by Jesus – he argues – is Periqlytos, meaning Ahmad.

In his book he explains his reason to conversion as follows:

My conversion to Islam cannot be attributed to any cause other than the gracious direction of the Almighty Allah. Without this Divine guidance all learning, search and other efforts to find the Truth may even lead one astray. The moment I believed in the Absolute Unity of God, His holy Apostle Muhammad became the pattern of my conduct and behavior.

== Quotes ==
I must remind the Christians that unless they believe in the absolute unity of God, and renounce the belief in the three persons, they are certainly unbelievers in the true God ... The Old Testament and the Qur'an condemn the doctrine of three persons in God; the New Testament does not expressly hold or defend it, but even if it contains hints and traces concerning the Trinity, it is no authority at all, because it was neither seen nor written by Christ himself, nor in the language he spoke, nor did it exist in its present form and contents for – at least – the first two centuries after him.

Ever since the day when God revealed to Abraham in Ur of the Chaldees until the Creed and the Acts of the Council of Nicea were proclaimed and enforced by an imperial edict of Constantine amidst the horror and protests of three-fourths of the true believing members in A.D. 325, never has the Oneness of God so officially and openly been profaned by those who pretended to be His people as Constantine and his gang of the unbelieving ecclesiastic!

== Bibliography ==
- Articles by Benjamin David
- Rev David Benjamin Keldani (Abdul Ahad Dawud, Muhammad in World Scriptures ISBN 983-9154-65-6
- David Benjamin: Muhammad in der Bibel. München 1992. ISBN 3-926575-00-X, - 2., neubearb. Aufl., SKD Bavaria, München 2002, ISBN 3-926575-90-5
- Fiey, Jean Maurice (1993). Pour un Oriens Christianus Novus: Répertoire des diocèses syriaques orientaux et occidentaux. Beirut: Orient-Institut. ISBN 9783515057189.
