= Benediction of the Blessed Sacrament =

Catholic and Anglo-Catholic churches display of the Eucharist

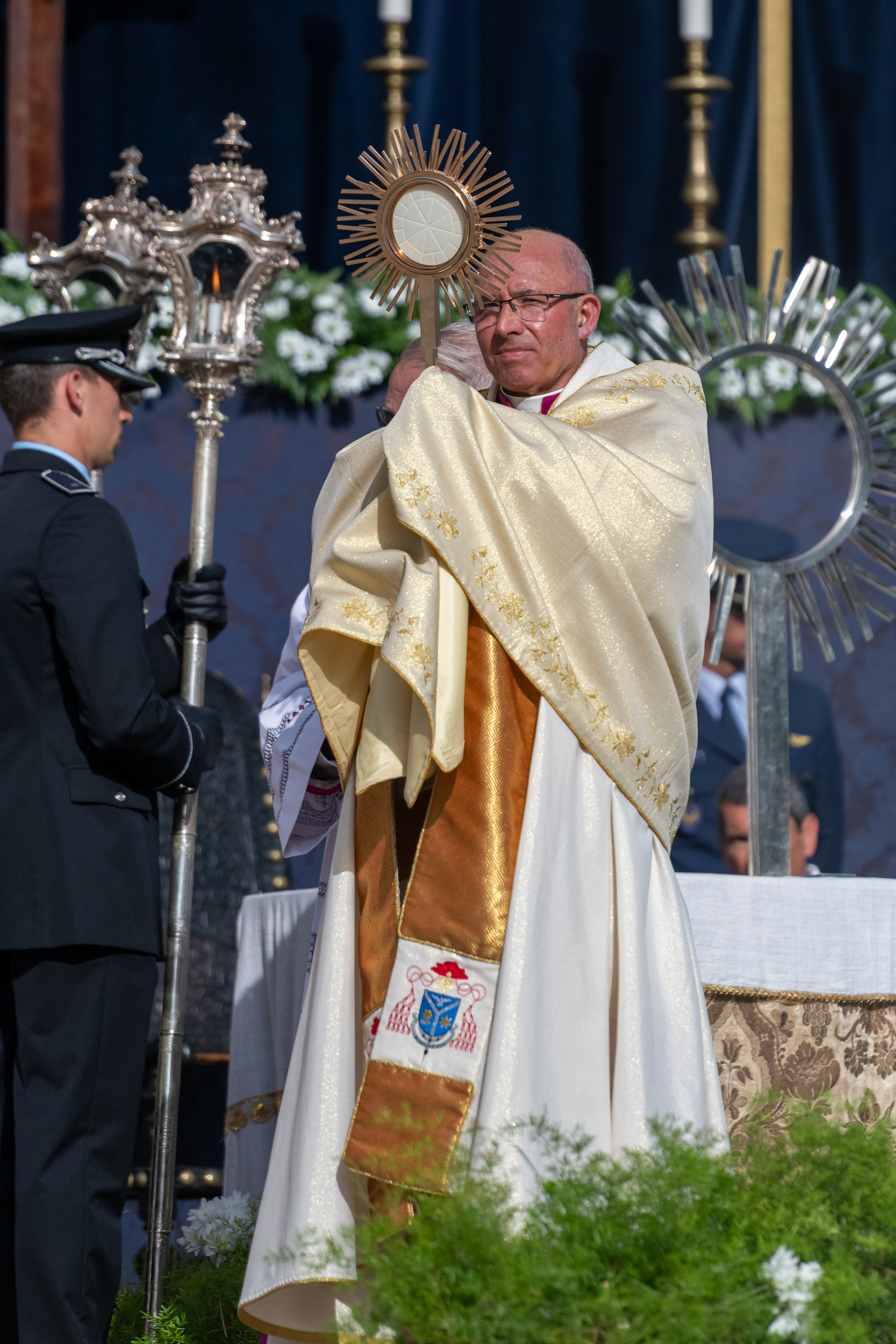
Rui Valério, Patriarch of Lisbon, vested in a humeral veil, holding a monstrance containing the Blessed Sacrament

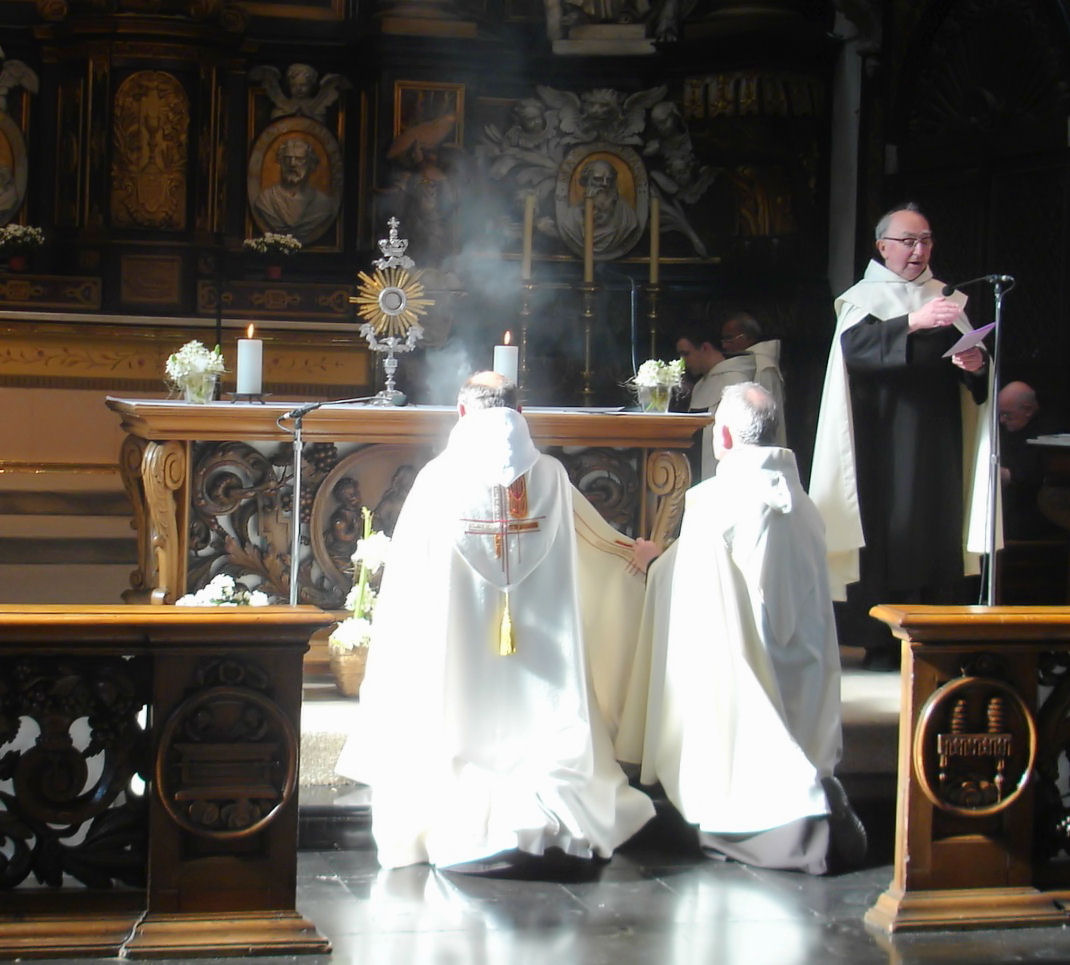
Benediction at a Carmelite friary in Ghent, Belgium

Benediction of the Blessed Sacrament, also called Benediction with the Blessed Sacrament or the Rite of Eucharistic Exposition and Benediction, is a devotional ceremony, celebrated especially in the Catholic Church, but also in some other Christian traditions such as Anglo-Catholicism, whereby a bishop, a priest, or a deacon blesses the congregation with the Eucharist at the end of a period of adoration.

== Exposition before the blessing ==
The actual benediction or blessing follows exposition of the Blessed Sacrament, i.e., the placing of the consecrated Host in a monstrance set upon the altar or at least exposition of a ciborium containing the Blessed Sacrament. Thus "the blessing with the Eucharist is preceded by a reasonable time for readings of the word of God, songs, prayers, and a period for silent prayer", while "exposition merely for the purpose of giving benediction is prohibited".

The readings, songs and prayers are meant to direct attention to worship of Christ in the Eucharist. A prayerful spirit is encouraged also by periods of silence and by a homily or brief exhortations aimed at developing a better understanding of the mystery of the Eucharist.

Latin hymns traditionally sung during the exposition are "O Salutaris Hostia", "Tantum Ergo", "Laudate Dominum" (Psalm 117) and "Ave verum corpus". The Divine Praises are a prayer traditionally recited but no specific hymn or prayer is required, except that, immediately before the blessing, one or other of seven prayers given in the Rite of Eucharistic Exposition and Benediction, 98 and 224-229 is to be recited.

== Latin Church ==
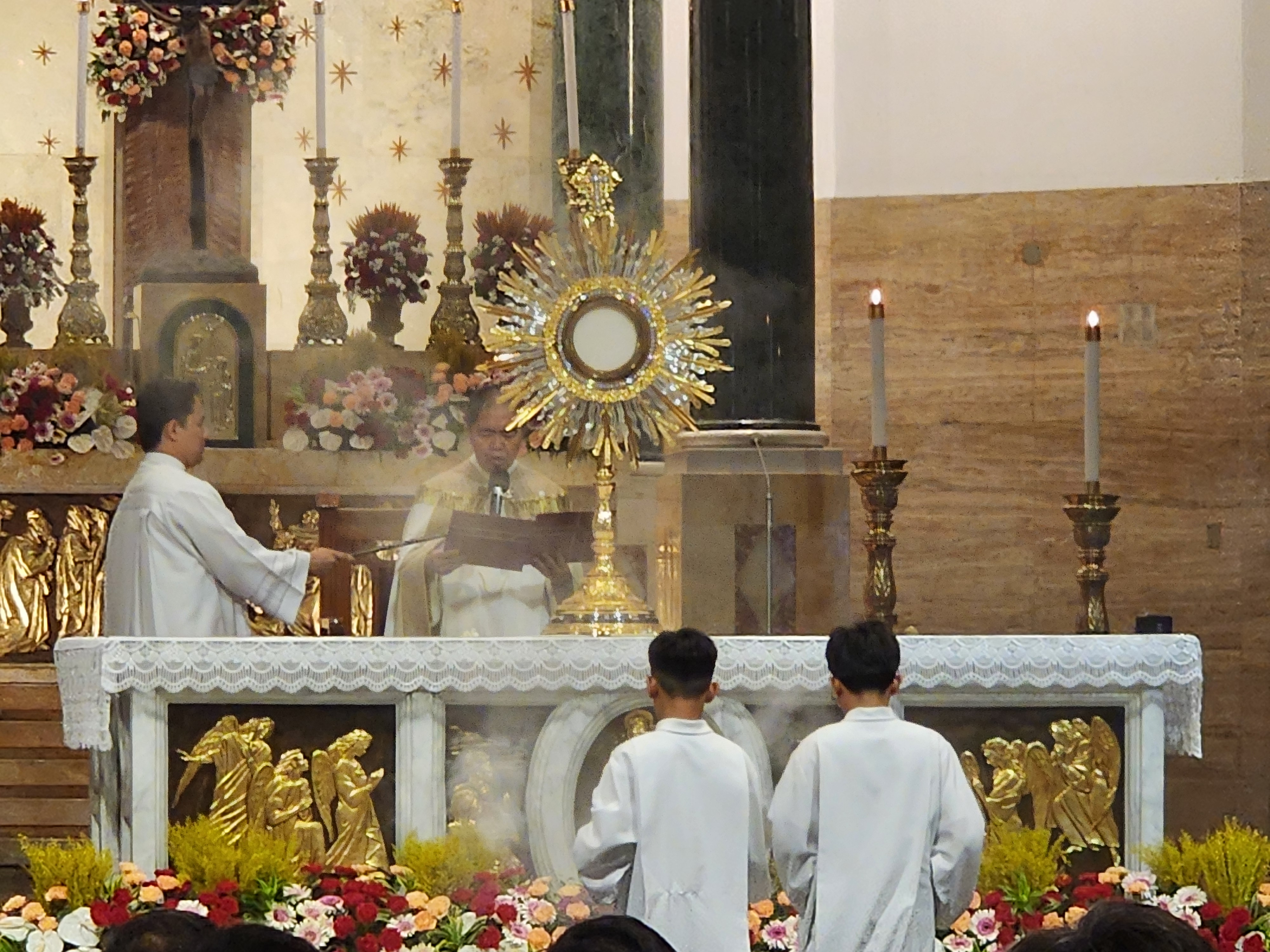
Benediction at the Manila Cathedral

Before publication of the 1973 Rite of Eucharistic Exposition and Benediction, there was no codification of the rite. However, the guidelines for the Diocese of Rome issued under Pope Clement XII (and hence called the Clementine Instruction) and drawn up by the Cardinal Vicar, Prospero Lambertini (later Pope Benedict XIV), were widely adopted.

The rite now in force for the Latin Church requires the use of incense at the beginning of the exposition and before the blessing, if the Blessed Sacrament is exposed in a monstrance, but not if a ciborium is used (although sometimes this is omitted). Similarly, the priest or deacon, wearing an alb or a surplice, should also put on a cope and use a humeral veil when giving the blessing with the Blessed Sacrament in a monstrance, but the cope is not required when using a ciborium.

A person other than a priest or deacon authorized to expose the Eucharist for adoration cannot give the blessing with it.

Immediately after the benediction, the Blessed Sacrament is replaced in the church tabernacle, while an acclamation such as "O Sacrament Most Holy", or the hymn Holy God, We Praise Thy Name. (An exception is if the Divine Praises in expiation of blasphemies, "Blessed be God" etc., follow; in that case, the Blessed Sacrament is put back to the altar, and the Divine Praises are said while an altar server removes the humeral veil from the celebrant and puts it back aside, usually to the credence table. The celebrant then reposes the Blessed Sacrament once the Divine Praises are finished.)

Zucchetti are to be removed during the Benediction (and the preceding adoration) – they may only be donned again once the Blessed Sacrament is replaced.

== Eastern Christianity ==
Among the Eastern Catholic churches, the Ukrainian Catholic Church, the Ruthenian Catholic Church, the Melkite Catholic Church, and the Maronite Catholic Church, have a rite of Benediction.

While Benediction with the Blessed Sacrament is not a practice of most Eastern Orthodox or Oriental Orthodox churches, or of the Assyrian Church of the East, these churches do believe in the Real Presence. As a sign of this, in many Eastern Orthodox churches, the Eucharist is venerated during the Divine Liturgy; however, this is part of the liturgy and not a distinct form of benediction. When the deacon brings the chalice out before the Communion of the Faithful, all either make a full prostration or bow. Also, at the Liturgy of the Presanctified Gifts, during the Great Entrance, as the priest carries the chalice and diskos (paten) to the Holy Doors, everyone prostrates themselves in veneration before the Eucharist. The Ukrainian Orthodox Church of the USA has had a rite of Benediction.

== See also ==
- Corpus Christi (feast)
- Elevation (liturgy)
- Eucharistic adoration
