= Łewond =

Łewond (Old Armenian: Ղեւոնդ) or Leontius was a late 8th-century Armenian priest and historian. Very little is known about his life, except that he was an eyewitness to the events he describes after 774.

His historical work was commissioned by Sapuh, son of Smbat VII Bagratuni, the presiding prince of Armenia in 761–775, and covers the years 632 to 789. It is an indispensable source for the early history of Arab rule over Armenia; indeed for the years 662–770 his account is the only testimony of note. It also contains important information on the Arab–Byzantine wars of the period. The work includes a version of the correspondence between Leo III and Umar II, a letter supposedly sent by the Byzantine emperor Leo III the Isaurian (r. 717–741) to the Umayyad caliph Umar II (r. 717–720) that contains a defence of the Christian faith, but this version is a later Armenian composition.

== Sources ==
- Canard, Marius & Cahen, Claude (1960). "Armīniya". In Gibb, H. A. R.; Kramers, J. H.; Lévi-Provençal, E.; Schacht, J.; Lewis, B. & Pellat, Ch. (eds.). The Encyclopaedia of Islam, Second Edition. Volume I: A–B. Leiden: E. J. Brill. pp. 634–640. doi:10.1163/1573-3912_islam_COM_0064. OCLC 495469456.
- Kazhdan, Alexander, ed. (1991). The Oxford Dictionary of Byzantium. Oxford and New York: Oxford University Press. ISBN 0-19-504652-8.
- Mahé, Jean-Pierre; Martin-Hisard, Bernadette (2015). Łewond Vardapet: discours historique. Paris: ACHCByz. ISBN 9782916716565.
