= Ali ibn Sahl Rabban al-Tabari =

Persian scholar and physician

Ali ibn Sahl Rabban al-Tabari علي بن سهل ربَّن طبري
- Born: Amol, Iran
- Died: Samarra, Iraq

Philosophical work
- Era: Islamic Golden Age
- Notable students: Abu Bakr al-Razi
- Main interests: Medicine, philosophy, calligraphy, astronomy
- Notable works: Firdaws al-Hikmah, first Islamic encyclopedic work on medicine
- Notable ideas: Discovery of the contagious nature of pulmonary tuberculosis

Ali ibn Sahl Rabban al-Tabari (Persian: علی ابن سهل ربن طبری آملی; c. 838 – c. 870 CE; also given as 810–855 or 808–864 also 783–858), was a Persian Muslim scholar, physician and psychologist, who produced one of the first Islamic encyclopedia of medicine titled Firdaws al-Hikmah ("Paradise of Wisdom"). Ali ibn Sahl spoke Syriac and Greek, the two sources of the medical tradition of Antiquity which had been lost by medieval Europe, and transcribed in meticulous calligraphy. His most famous student was the physician and alchemist Abu Bakr al-Razi (c. 865–925). Al-Tabari wrote the first encyclopedic work on medicine. He lived for over 70 years and interacted with important figures of the time, such as Muslim caliphs, governors, and eminent scholars. Because of his family's religious history, as well as his religious work, al-Tabarī was one of the most controversial scholars. He first discovered that pulmonary tuberculosis is contagious.

Outside the rational sciences, as a convert from Christianity to Islam he was also involved in interreligious polemics, writing two works critical of his former religion, al-Radd ´alā l-Nasārā (The Refutation of the Christians) and Kitāb al-Dīn wa-l-Dawla (The Book of Religion and Empire), both of which having been published by Brill in 2016 in a single book, The Polemical Works of ʿAlī al-Ṭabarī.

== Life ==
Ali came from a Persian or Syriac family of Tabaristan Amol (hence al-Tabari – "from Tabaristan"). Hossein Nasr states that he was a convert to Islam from Zoroastrianism, however Sami K. Hamarneh and Franz Rosenthal state he was a convert from Christianity. His father Sahl ibn Bishr was a state official, highly educated and well respected member of the Syriac community. Rabbān received his educational bases in the medical field, natural sciences, calligraphy, mathematics, philosophy and literature from his father Sahl.

The Abbasid caliph al-Mu'tasim (833–842) took him into the service of the court, which he continued under al-Mutawakkil (847–861). Ali ibn Sahl was fluent in Syriac and Greek, the two sources for the medical tradition of antiquity, and versed in fine calligraphy.

== Works ==
Although few of his works are extant, al-Tabarī wrote twelve books. Most of them were about medicine. In addition to medicine, he was known as a scholar of philosophy, mathematics and astronomy.

1. His Firdaws al-Hikmah ("Paradise of Wisdom"), which he wrote in Arabic called also al-Kunnash was a system of medicine in seven parts. He also translated it into Syriac, to give it wider usefulness. The information in Firdaws al-Hikmah has never entered common circulation in the West because it was not edited until the 20th century, when Mohammed Zubair Siddiqui assembled an edition using the five surviving partial manuscripts. There is still no English translation. A German translation by Alfred Siggel of the chapters on Indian medicine was published in 1951.
2. Tuhfat al-Muluk ("The King's Present")
3. a work on the proper use of food, drink, and medicines.
4. Hafzh al-Sihhah ("The Proper Care of Health"), following Greek and Indian authorities.
5. Kitab al-Ruqa ("Book of Magic or Amulets")
6. Kitab fi al-hijamah ("Treatise on Cupping")
7. Kitab fi Tartib al-'Ardhiyah ("Treatise on the Preparation of Food")

=== Firdaws al-Hikmah ===
Firdaws al-Hikmah or Paradise of Wisdom is one of the oldest encyclopedias of Islamic medicine, based on Syriac translations of Greek and Indian sources (Hippocrates, Galen, Dioscorides, and others).It is divided into 7 sections and 30 parts, with 360 chapters in total.

- Part I. general philosophical ideas, the categories, natures, elements, metamorphosis, genesis and decay.subdivided into I2 chapters, treats of general philosophical ideas, mostly following Aristotle.
  - On the Name of the Book and its Composition. The author mentions among his sources Hippocrates, Galen and Aristotle Hunayn ibn Ishaq
  - On Matter Shape, Quantity and Quality
  - On simple and compound Temperaments
  - On the Antagonism of these Temperaments and the Refutation of the Opinion of those who allege that the Air is cold (of temper.). diagram of the four temperaments and their antagonistic action.
  - On the Genesis of Temperaments one from another.
  - On Metamorphosis Plato is quoted.
  - On Genesis and Decay.
  - On Activity and Passivity
  - On the Genesis of Things from the Elements, the Action of the Celestial Sphere and the Luminous Bodies therein.
  - On the Effects of the Action of the Elements on the Air and subterranean Conditions
  - On shooting Stars and the Colors which are generated in the Air. (rainbows)
- Part II embryology, pregnancy, the functions and morphology of different organs, ages and seasons, psychology, the external and internal senses, the temperaments and emotions, personal idiosyncrasies, nervous affections, tetanus, torpor, palpitation, nightmare, the evil eye, hygiene and dietetics.
  - Book I
  - Book II
  - Book III
  - Book IV
  - Book V
- Part III. Treats of nutrition and dietetics. 3 chapters
- Part IV. (The longest, 107 out of 276 folios and 152 chapters. Each chapter is short, often less than one page and seldom more than two. There is little beyond the signs and symptoms of each disease and the treatment recommended there are no references to actual cases, or clinical notes. ) general and special pathology, from the head to the feet, and concludes with an account of the number of muscles, nerves and veins, and dissertations on phlebotomy, the pulse and urinoscopy.
  - Book 1 (9 chapters) on general pathology, the signs and symptoms of internal disorders, and the principles of therapeutics.
  - Book 2 (14 chapters) on diseases and injuries of the head; and diseases of the brain, including epilepsy, various kinds of headache, tinnitus, vertigo, amnesia, and nightmare.
  - Book 3 (12 chapters) on diseases of the eyes and eyelids, the ear and the nose (including epistaxis and catarrh), the face, mouth and teeth.
  - Book 4 (7 chapters) on nervous diseases, including spasm, tetanus, paralysis, facial palsy, etc.
  - Book 5 (7 chapters) on diseases of the throat, chest and vocal organs, including asthma.
  - Book 6 (6 chapters) on diseases of the stomach, including hiccup.
  - Book 7 (5 chapters) on diseases of the liver, including dropsy.
  - Book 8 (14 chapters) on diseases of the heart, lungs, gall-bladder and spleen.
  - Book 9 (19 chapters) on diseases of the intestines (especially colic), and of the urinary and genital organs.
  - Book 10 (26 chapters) on fevers, ephemeral, hectic, continuous, tertian, quartan and semi-quartan; on pleurisy, erysipelas, and smallpox; on crises, prognosis, favorable and unfavorable symptoms, and the signs of death.
  - Book 11 (13 chapters) on rheumatism, gout, sciatica, leprosy, elephantiasis, scrofula, lupus, cancer, tumours, gangrene, wounds and bruises, shock, and plague. The last four chapters deal with anatomical matters, including the numbers of the muscles, nerves and blood-vessels.
  - Book 12 (20 chapters) on phlebotomy, cupping, baths and the indications of the pulse and urine.
- Part V. of tastes, scents and colors. 1 book, 9 chapters
- Part VI materia medica and toxicology.
- Part VII. climate, waters and seasons in their relation to health, outlines of cosmography and astronomy, and the utility of the science of medicine: and a summary of Indian Medicine in 36 chapters.

== Legacy ==
In 2013 a statue of al-Tabari was revealed at the Mazandaran University of Medical Sciences.

== See also ==
- List of Islamic studies scholars
- List of Iranian scientists and scholars

== Sources ==
- H. Suter: Die Mathematiker und Astronomen der Araber (10, 1900)
- M. Steinschneider: Die arabische Literatur der Juden (23–34, Frankfurt, 1902).
- Edward G. Browne, Islamic Medicine: Fitzpatrick Lectures Delivered at the Royal College of Physicians in 1919-1920 2002, p. 37–38, ISBN 81-87570-19-9
- Tibi, Selma (2006). The Medicinal Use of Opium in Ninth-Century Baghdad. BRILL. pp. 68–90. ISBN 9789004146969.
- Ṭabarī, ʻAlī ibn Sahl Rabbān (1922). The Book of Religion and Empire: a Semi-official Defence and Exposition of Islam Written by Order at the Court and with the Assistance of the Caliph Mutawakkil (A.D. 847-861). University Press.
- Ṭabarī, ʻAlī ibn Sahl Rabbān; Siddiqi, Muḥammad Zubair (1975). فردوس الحكمة في الطب. مكتبة المتنبي،.
- Adang, Camilla, Muslim Writers on Judaism and the Hebrew Bible: From Ibn Rabbān to Ibn Hazm, Leiden: 1996, pp. 23-30.
- Ali b. Husayin al-Mas'ūdī, Murūj al-zahab wa ma'ādīn al-Jawhar. Ed. M. Muhyiddin Abdulhamīd, Kahire 1948, Beirut 1964-5, IV, 239.
- Ali b. Muhammad b. al-Athīr, al-Kāmil fi al-Tārīkh, ed.C. J. Tornberg, Leiden 1851, 76, VI, pp. 75- 76, 191-192.
- Ali b. Rabbān al-Tabarī, al-Dīn wa al-dawla, ed. ādil Nuwayhiz, Beyrut 1973, pp. 35, 36, 98, 210.
- Ar-Radd ‘alā-n-Nāsārā de ‘Ali at-Tabarī, ed. I. A. Khalifa - W. Kutsch, Beyrouth: Imprimerie Catholique, 1959.
- Firdaws al-hikma fī al-tibb, ed. by M. Z. Al-Siddiqī, Gibb Memorial, Berlin: Matba' āftāb, 1928, pp. 1-2, 8, 518, 519.
