= Meire =

Meire is a surname. Notable people with the surname include:

- Claudine Meire (born 1947), French sprinter
- Katrien Meire (born 1984), Belgian lawyer
- Stephanie Meire (born 1971), Belgian beauty pageant winner

== See also ==
- Leire (given name)
