= Leyre =

Leyre may refer to:

== Places ==
- Monastery of Leyre in Spain
- Eyre (river) in France

== Names ==
- Leyre Abadía (born 2000), Spanish synchronised swimmer
- Leyre Eizaguirre (born 1980), Spanish diver
- Leyre Monente (born 2000), Spanish footballer
- Leyre Romero Gormaz (born 2002), Spanish tennis player
- Diane Leyre (born 1997), French model and beauty pageant titleholder
- William Leyre, MP

== See also ==
- Leire (given name)
