= Wiliesind =

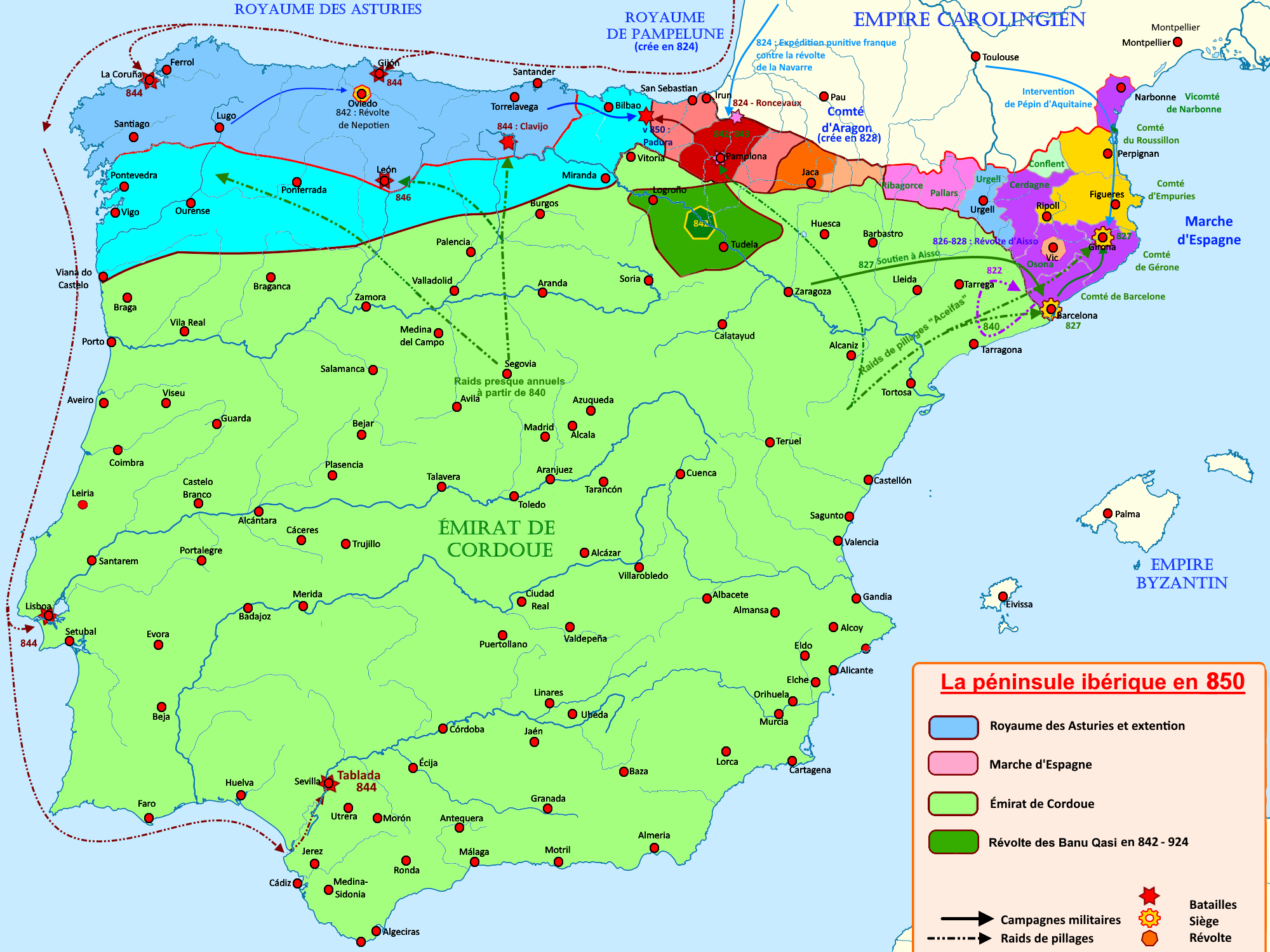
Map of Iberia (850)

Wiliesind was a bishop of Pamplona (floruit 848–67). His episcopate falls in a very obscure period in Pamplonan history. His predecessor, Opilano (floruit 829), is the first bishop mentioned in source after 693, and no successor of his is known before Jimeno in the 880s. Wiliesind's name is Gothic in origin, although the diocese of Pamplona was predominantly Basque at the time. It probably indicates that Pamplona still looked to Toledo as its spiritual guide, rather than across the Pyrenees.

In 848, Wiliesind hosted the visiting priest Eulogius of Córdoba, who subsequently wrote him a letter from prison in Córdoba on 15 November 851. He also sent him relics of the saints Acisclus and Zoilus. The letter survives and is an important record of the monasteries of the diocese of Pamplona and their libraries during the mid-ninth century. The letter also records that on account of war, Eulogius was unable to cross the Pyrenees. The letter was carried to Wiliesind by Galindo Enneconis (Íñiguez), probably a son of Íñigo Arista, the king of Pamplona, who died on 9 July 851. If this identification is correct, then Galindo was probably returning to Pamplona because of his father's death when he was asked to carry with him Eulogius' letter for the bishop.

According to a document dated to 867, a bishop of Pamplona named Gulgesind, probably the same person as Wiliesind, co-founded the monastery of Santa María de Fuenfría (Fontfrida) at Salvatierra de Esca with King García Íñiguez and Abbot Fortún of Leire.

== Sources ==
- Collins, Roger (1986). The Basques. The Peoples of Europe. Oxford: Blackwell.
- Sánchez-Albornoz, Claudio (1958). "La epístola de San Eulogio y el Muqtabis de Ibn Hayyan". Príncipe de Viana. 19 (72–73): 265–66.
- Ubieto Arteta, Antonio [in Spanish] (1962). "La redacción "rotense" de la Crónica de Alfonso III". Hispania. 22 (85): 3–22.
- Yaben, Hilario (1944). "La autenticidad de la Carta de San Eulogio al obispo de Pamplona". Príncipe de Viana. 5 (15): 161–72.
