= Monastery of Leyre =

Monastery in Navarre, Spain

Coordinates: 42°38′07″N 1°10′18″W

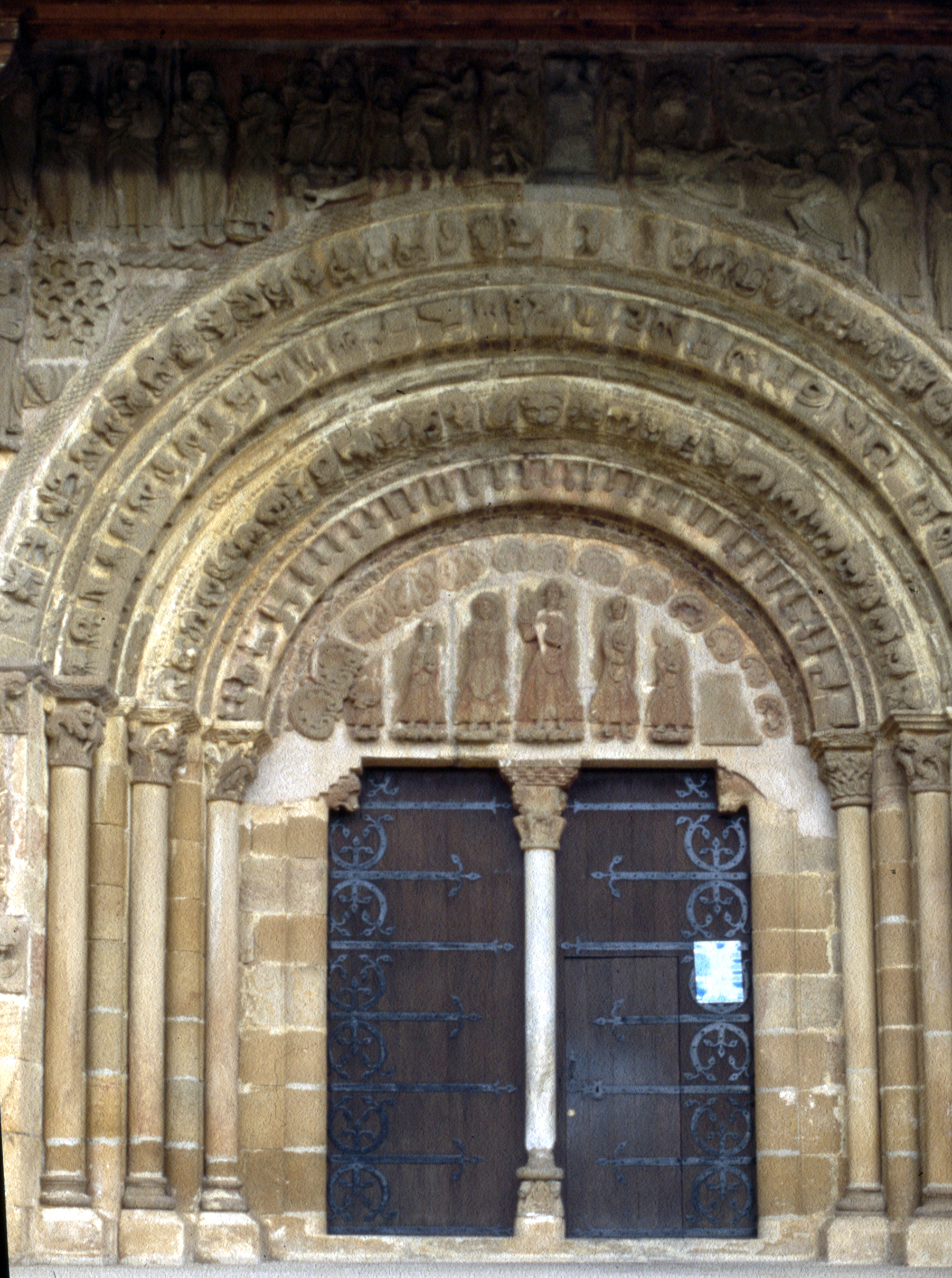
Porta Speciosa with a depiction of Nunio and Alodio, whose relics were once revered there (11th century).

The Monastery of San Salvador of Leyre (Basque: Leireko San Salbatore monasterioa; Spanish: Monasterio de San Salvador de Leire) is a religious complex to the south of the Sierra de Leyre, in northern Navarre, Spain, representing one of the most important historical monasteries of Spain.

== History ==
The oldest records of the site date from 842, when Íñigo Arista, considered the first king of Pamplona, and Wilesindo, Bishop of Pamplona, made a donation to the monastery. The monastery grew in importance thereafter, acquiring numerous properties and wealth during the first and middle stages of the Kingdom of Navarre, thanks to the privileges and donations made by the Navarrese kings. The monastery was expanded in the twelfth century. Several kings of Navarre were buried there.

Since then it has been in various states of repair, undergoing many expansions and remodelling (the most extensive carried out in the sixteenth century, when almost the entire monastery was rebuilt). Romanesque architecture pieces have survived until the present day (such as the church, with its Porta Speciosa), as well as parts that are even more ancient such as the notable crypt.

Leyre was founded as a Benedictine monastery, but later came to be owned by Cistercian monks. Currently, the monastery belongs to the Chartered Community of Navarre, which has transferred the monastery to its original inhabitants, the Benedictine order, for care and operation.

In June 2015, the monastery was the setting for the first official visit of Felipe, Prince of Asturias as King of Spain with his wife Princess Letizia.

== Importance ==
The monastery is located on one of the various routes of the Way of Saint James coming from the Corridor of Berdún and Jaca. The name of the monastery has been adopted as a female name under the form Leire, especially popular across the Basque Country.

The Leyre Casket, an ornate ivory casket produced in 1004/5 in Muslim Cordoba which held the relics of Nunio and Alodio for some time, belonged to the monastery for several centuries and takes it name from the monastery.

== Gallery ==
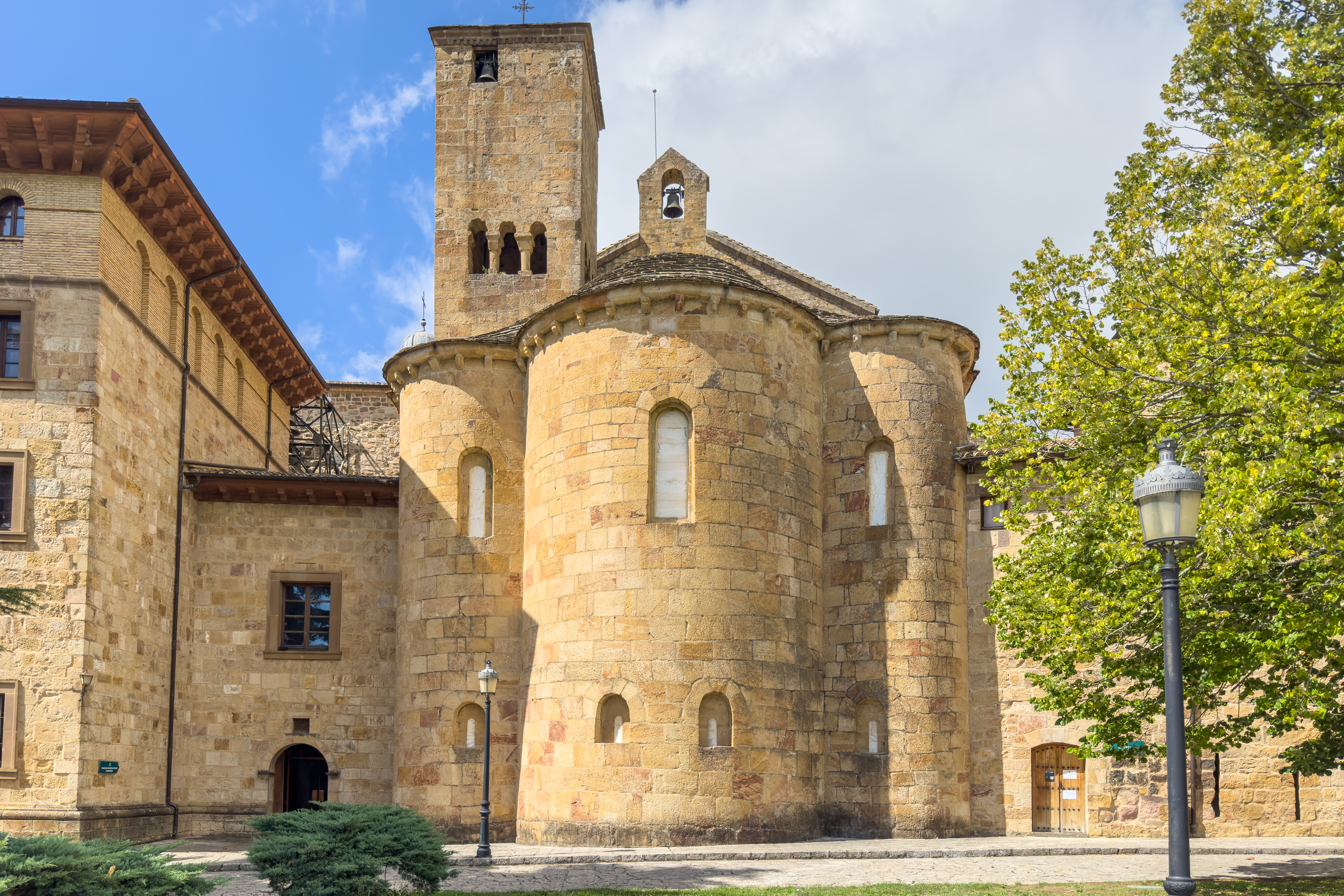

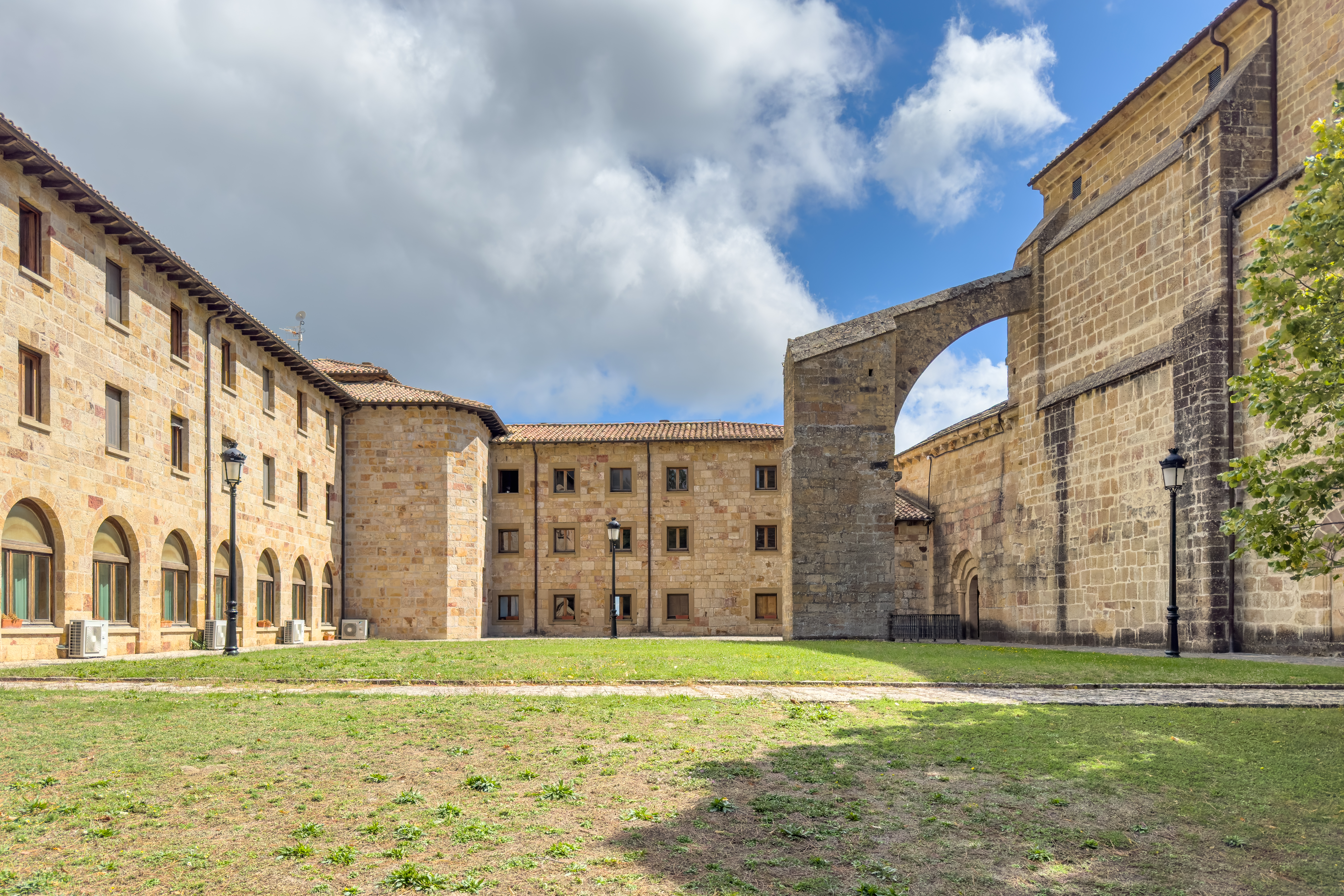

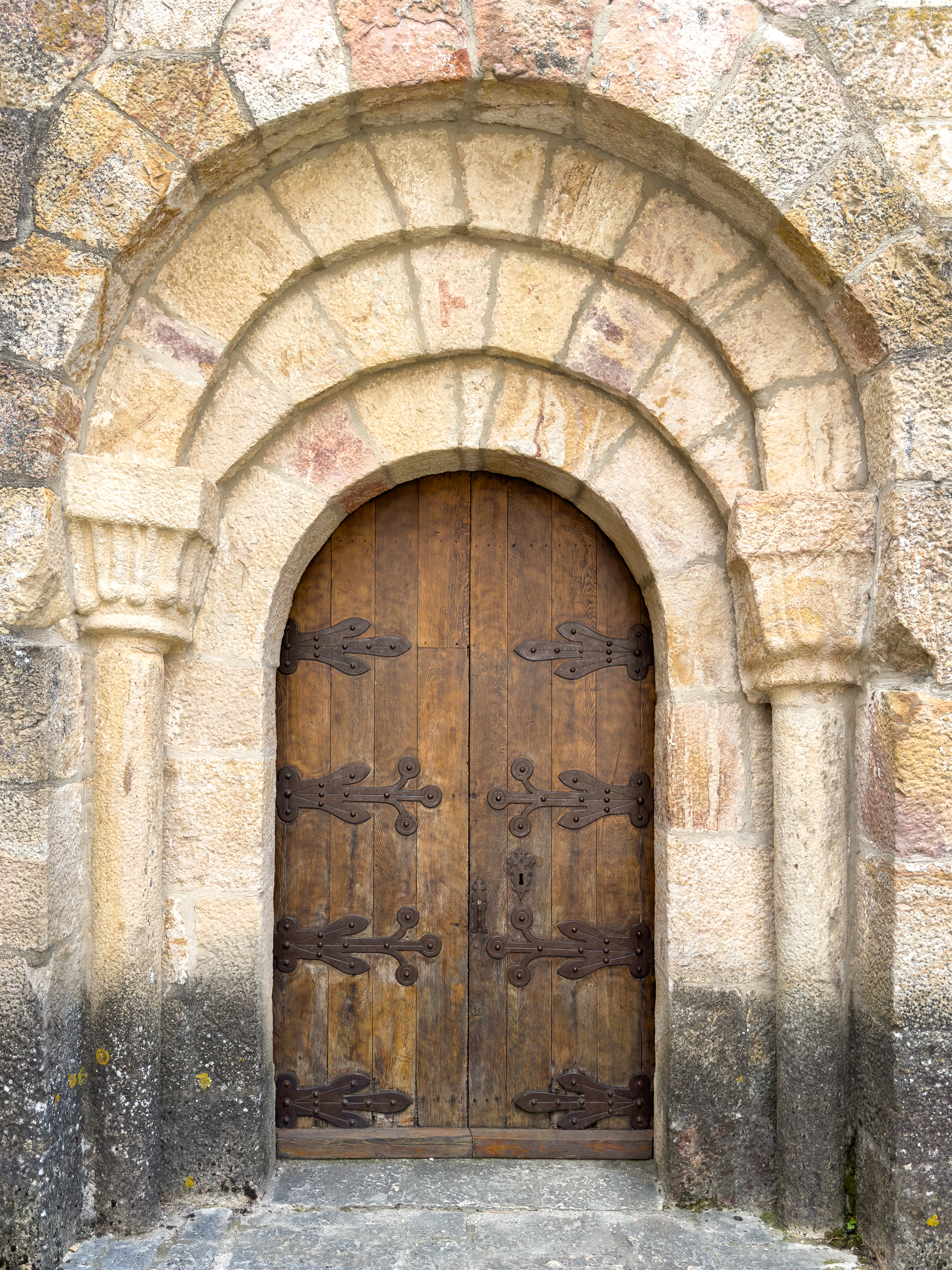

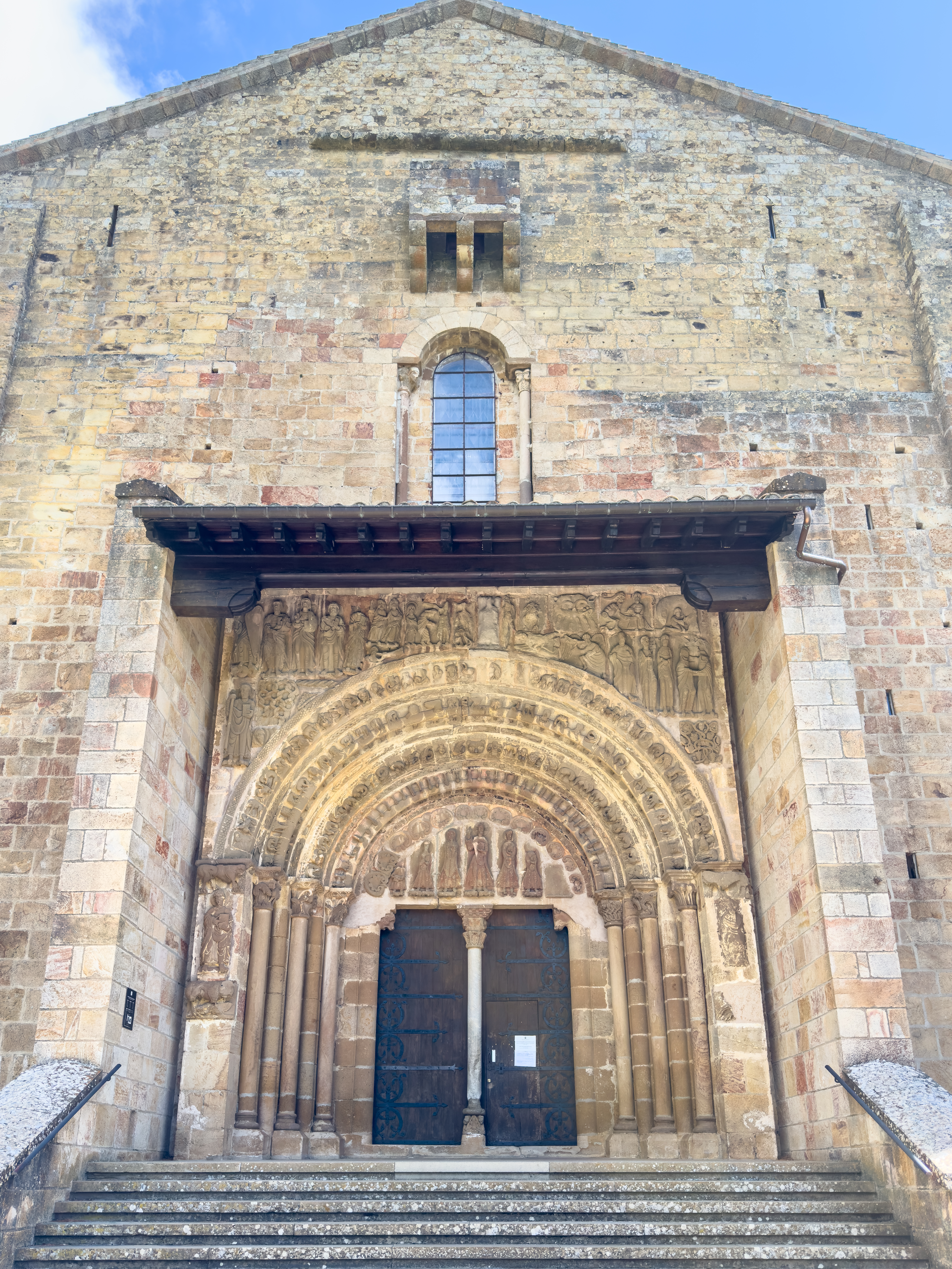

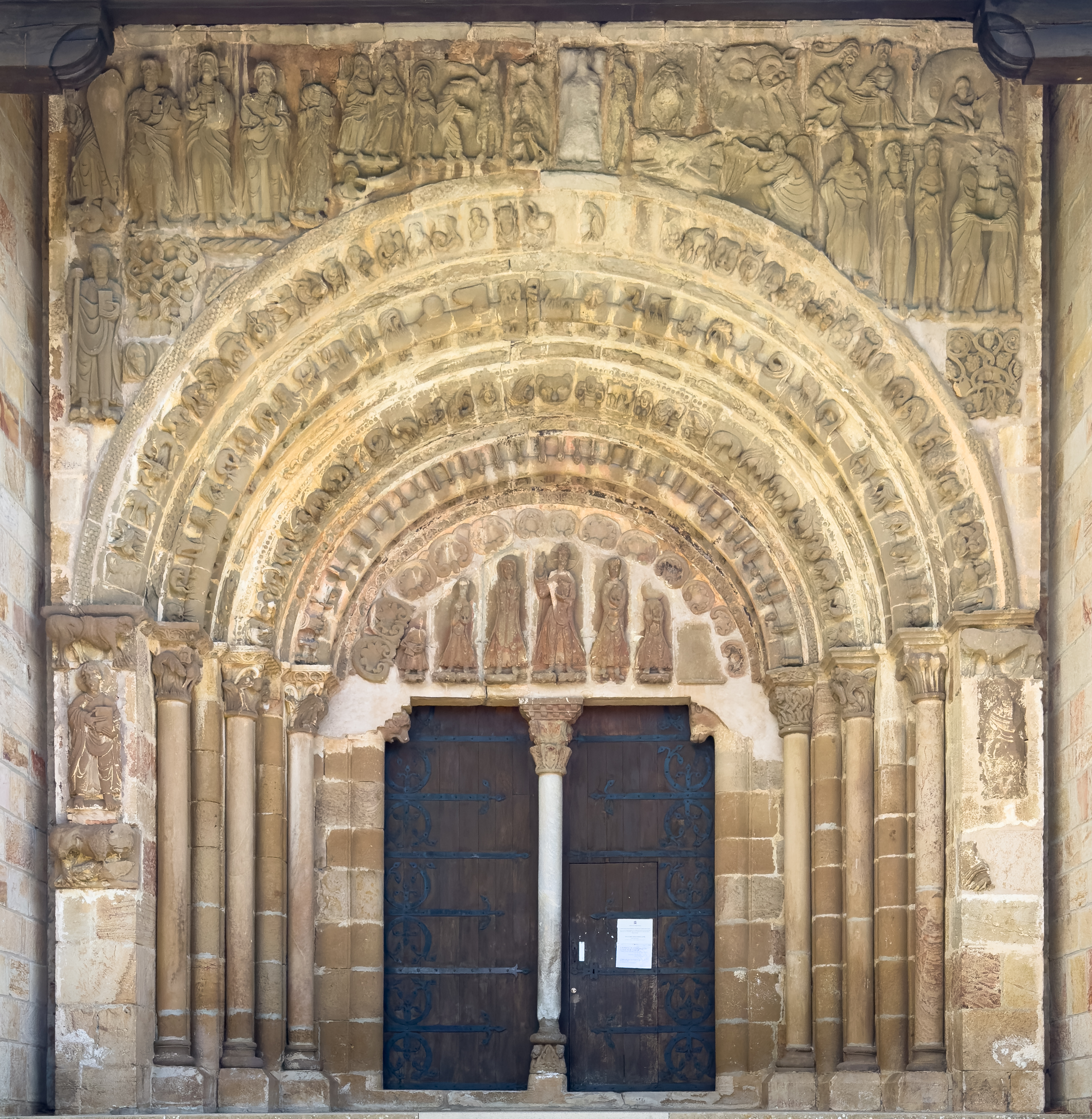

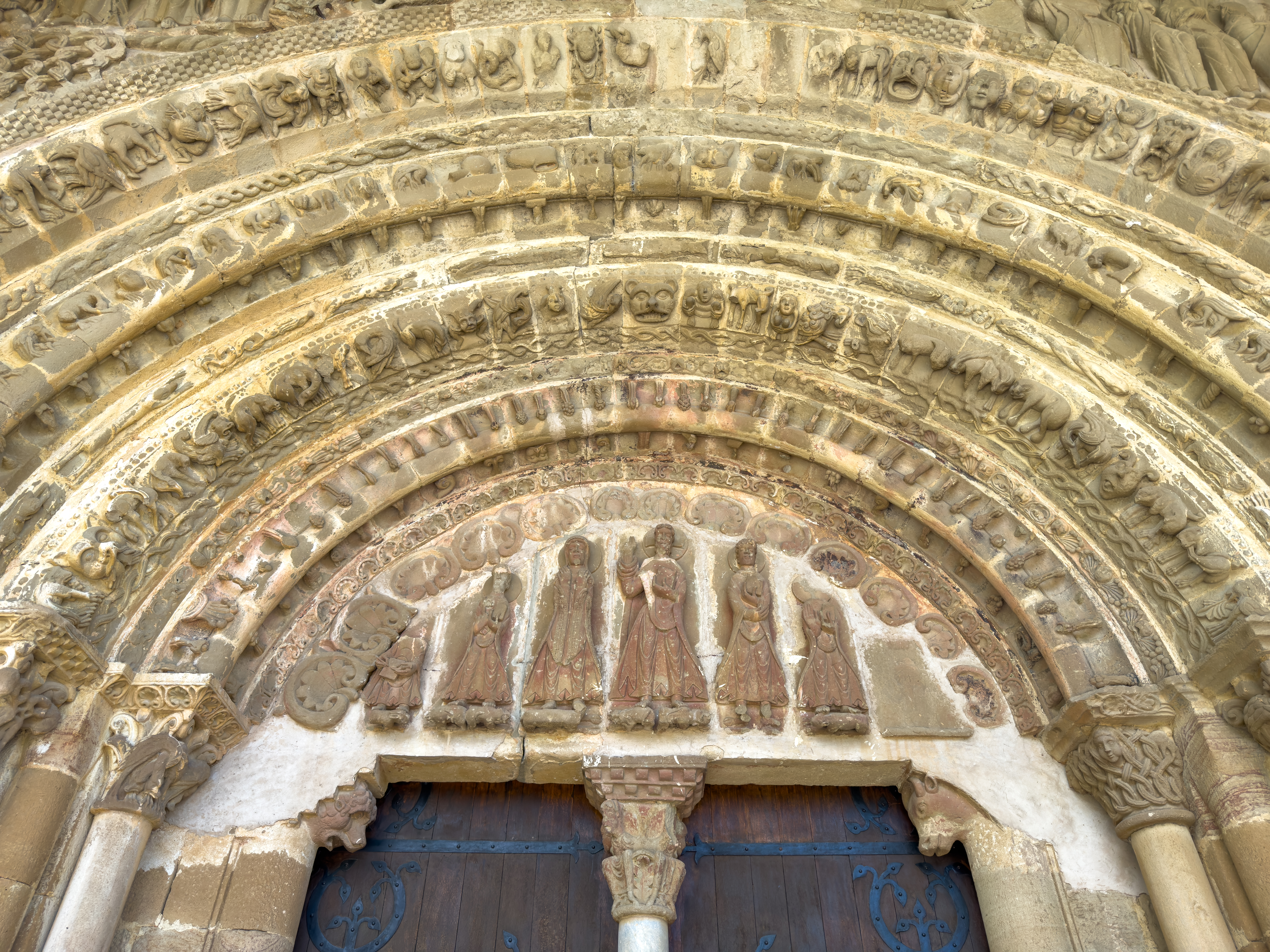

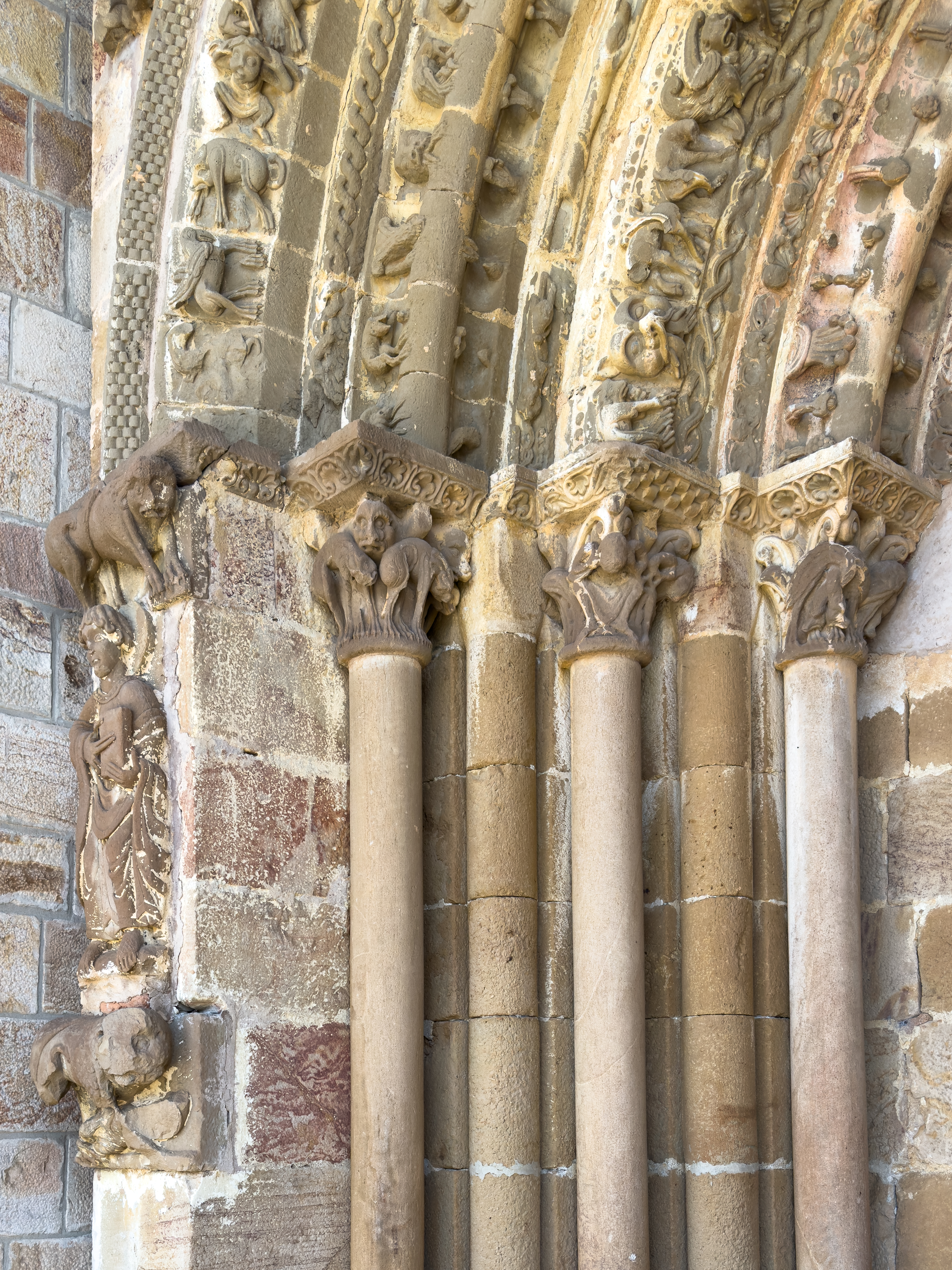

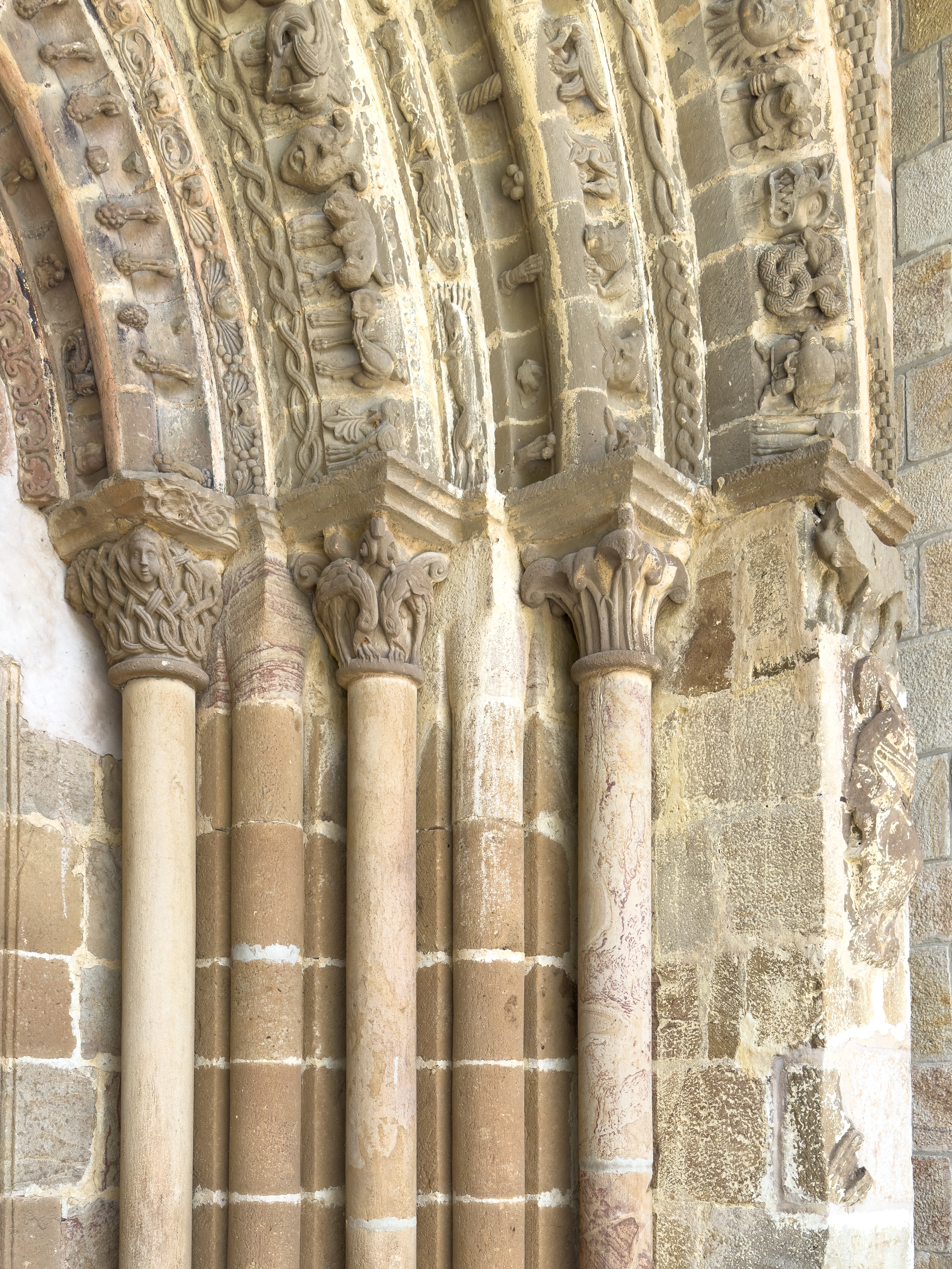

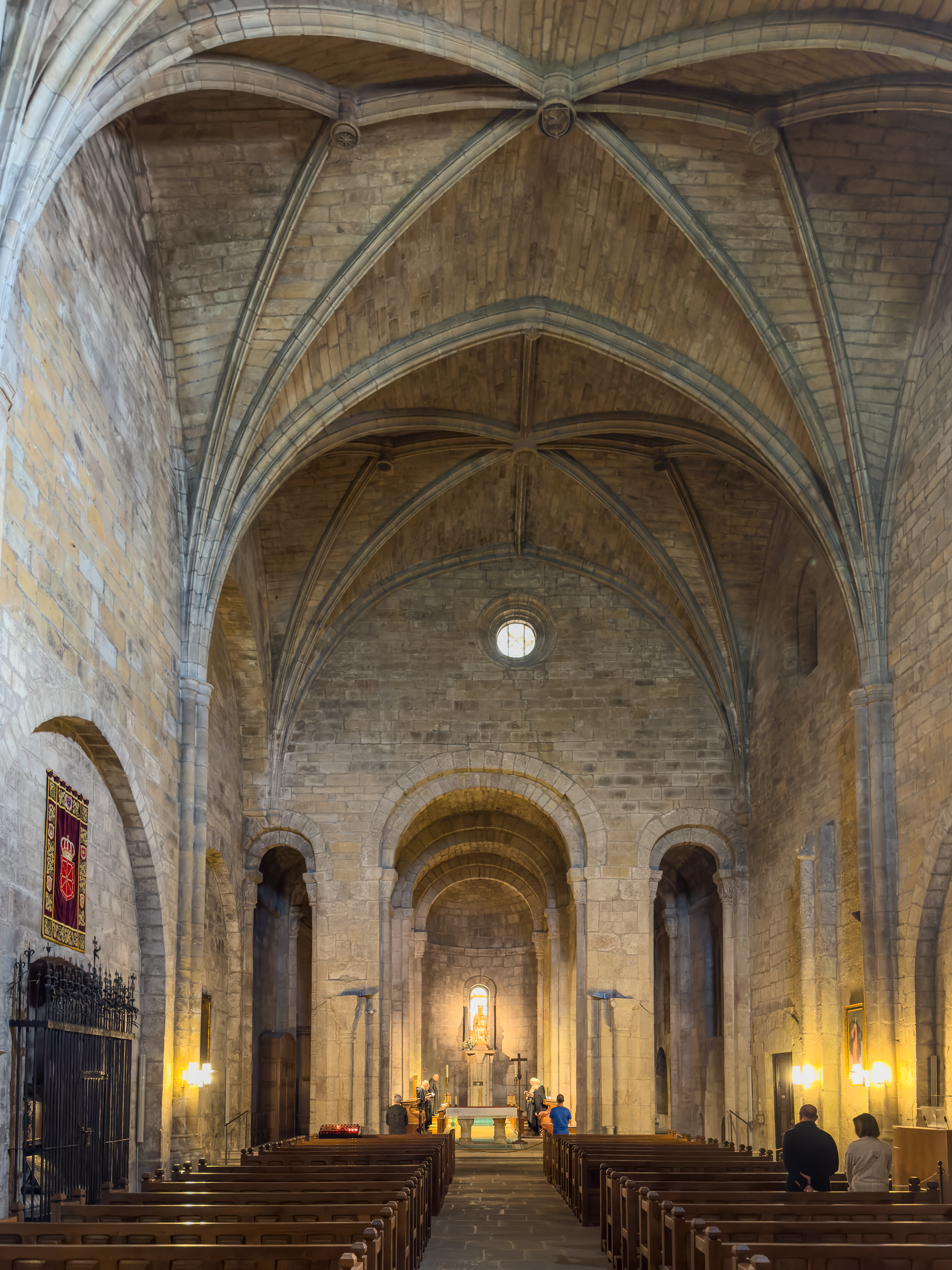

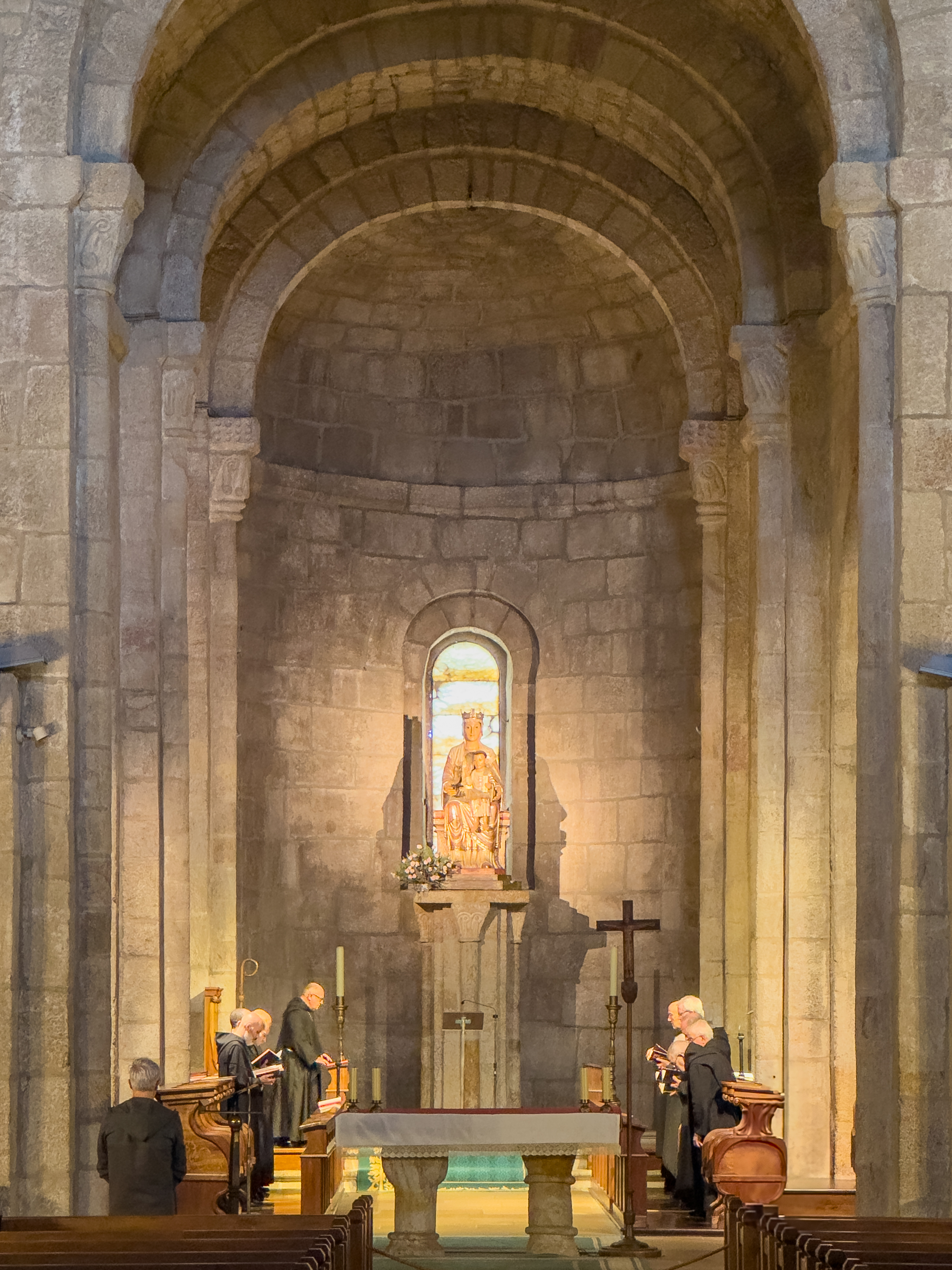

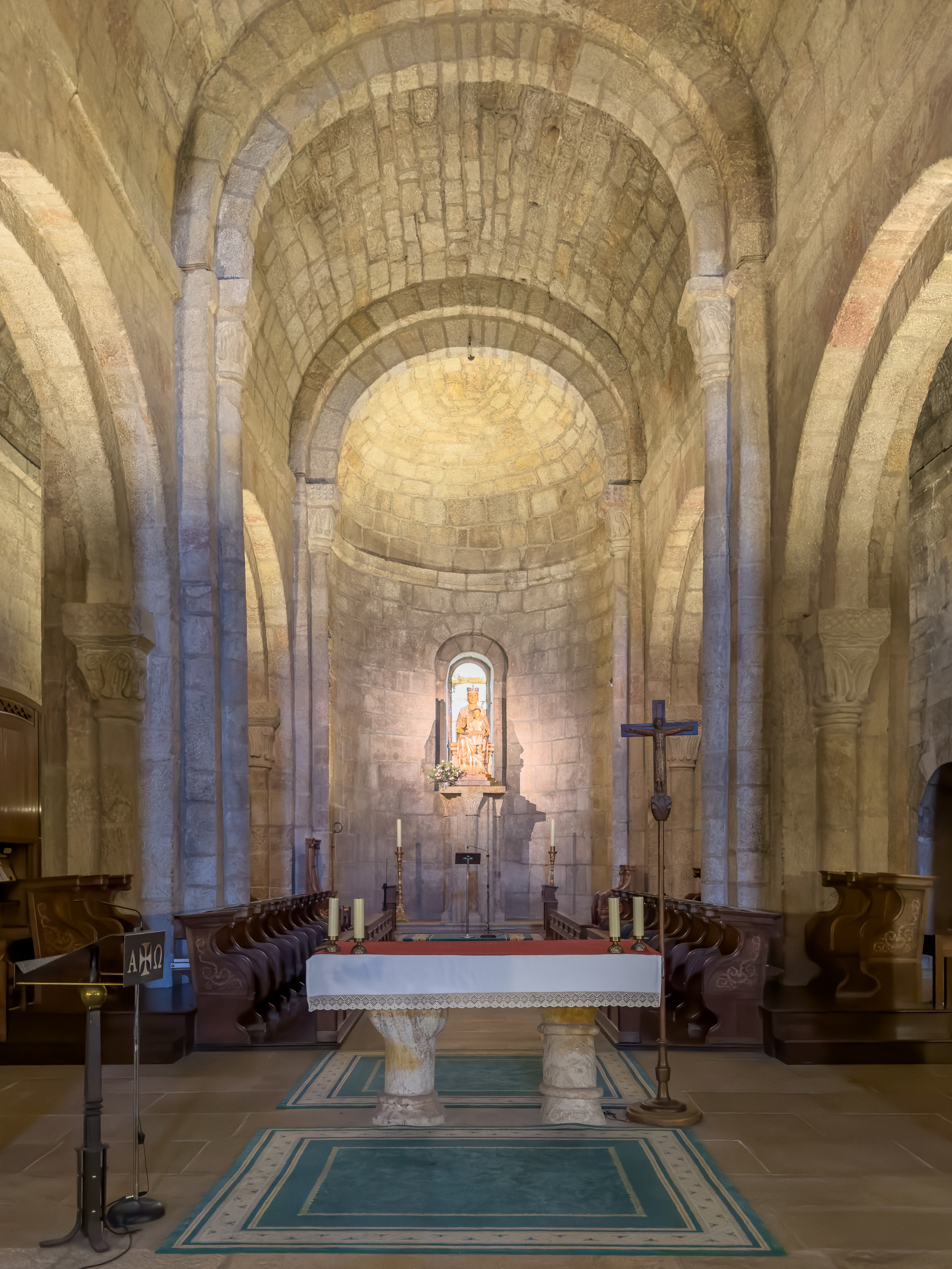

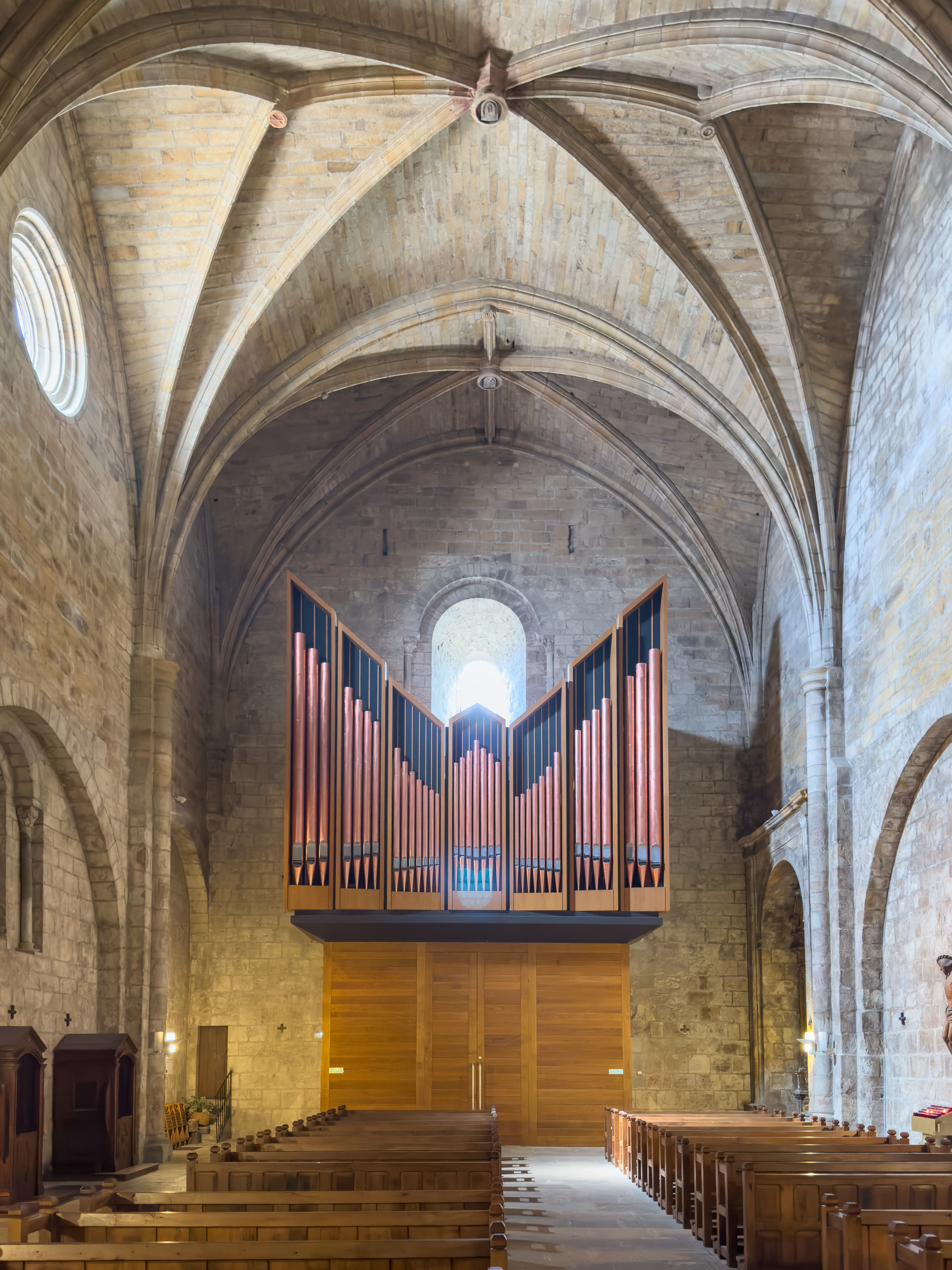

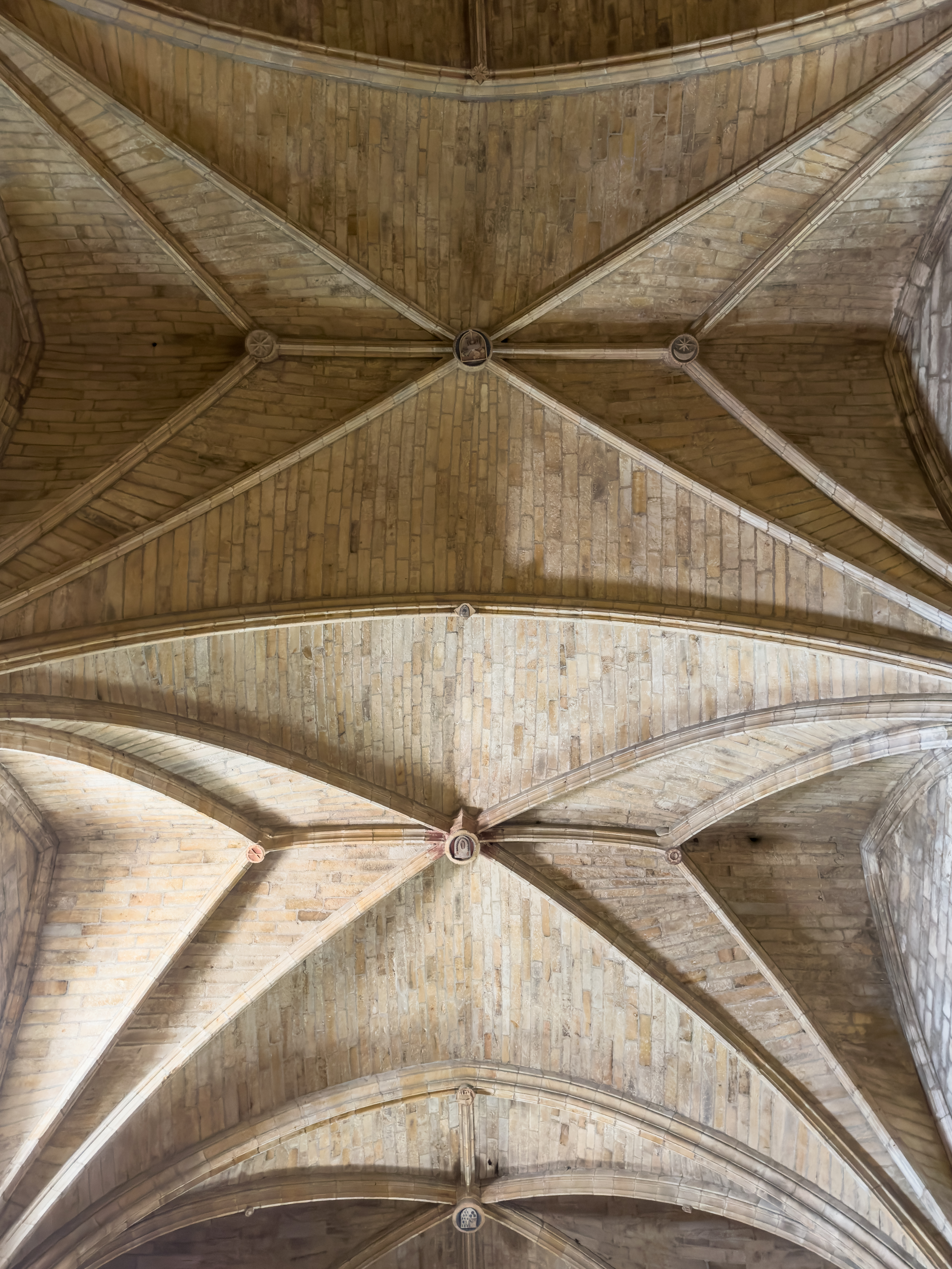

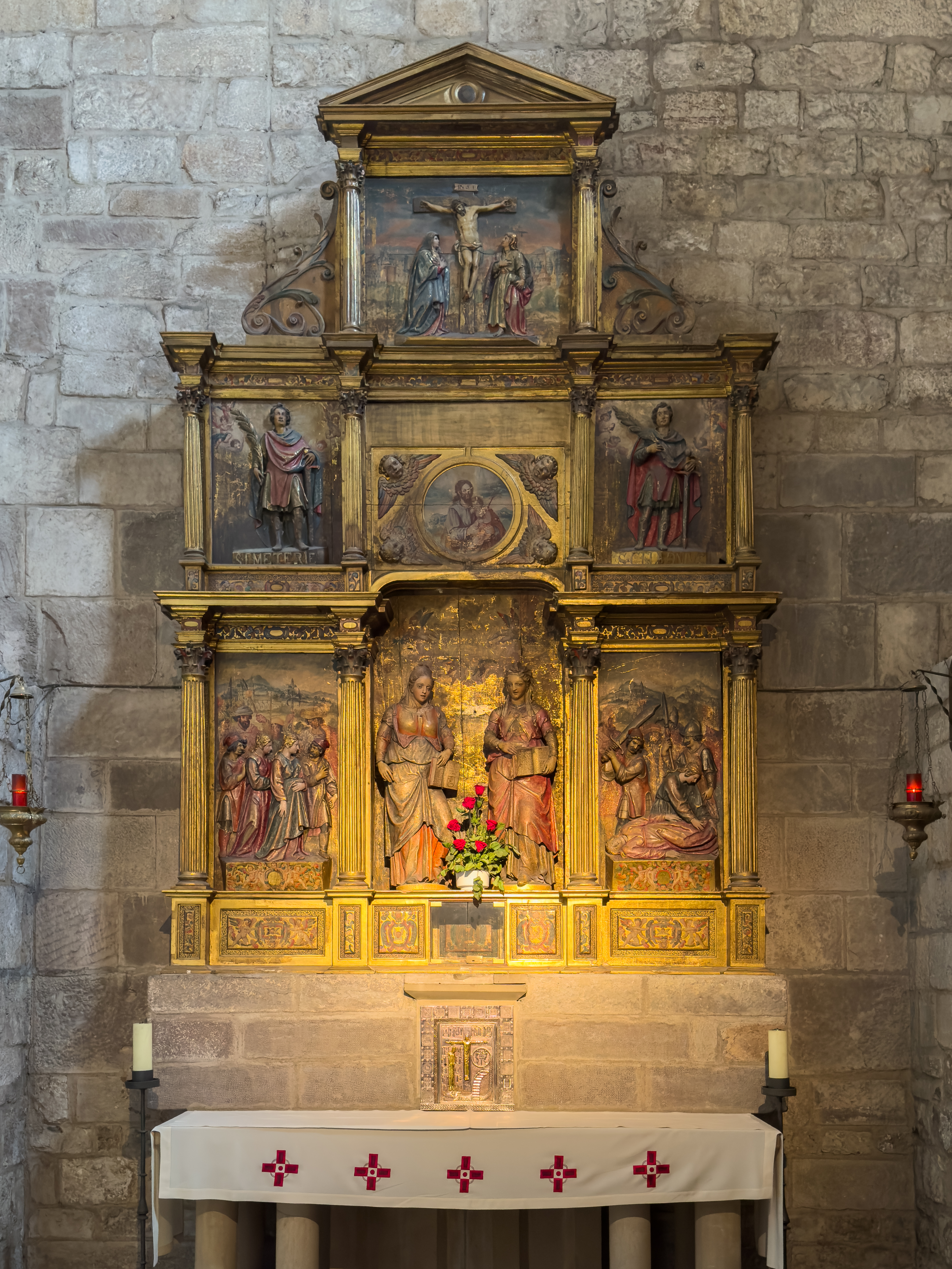

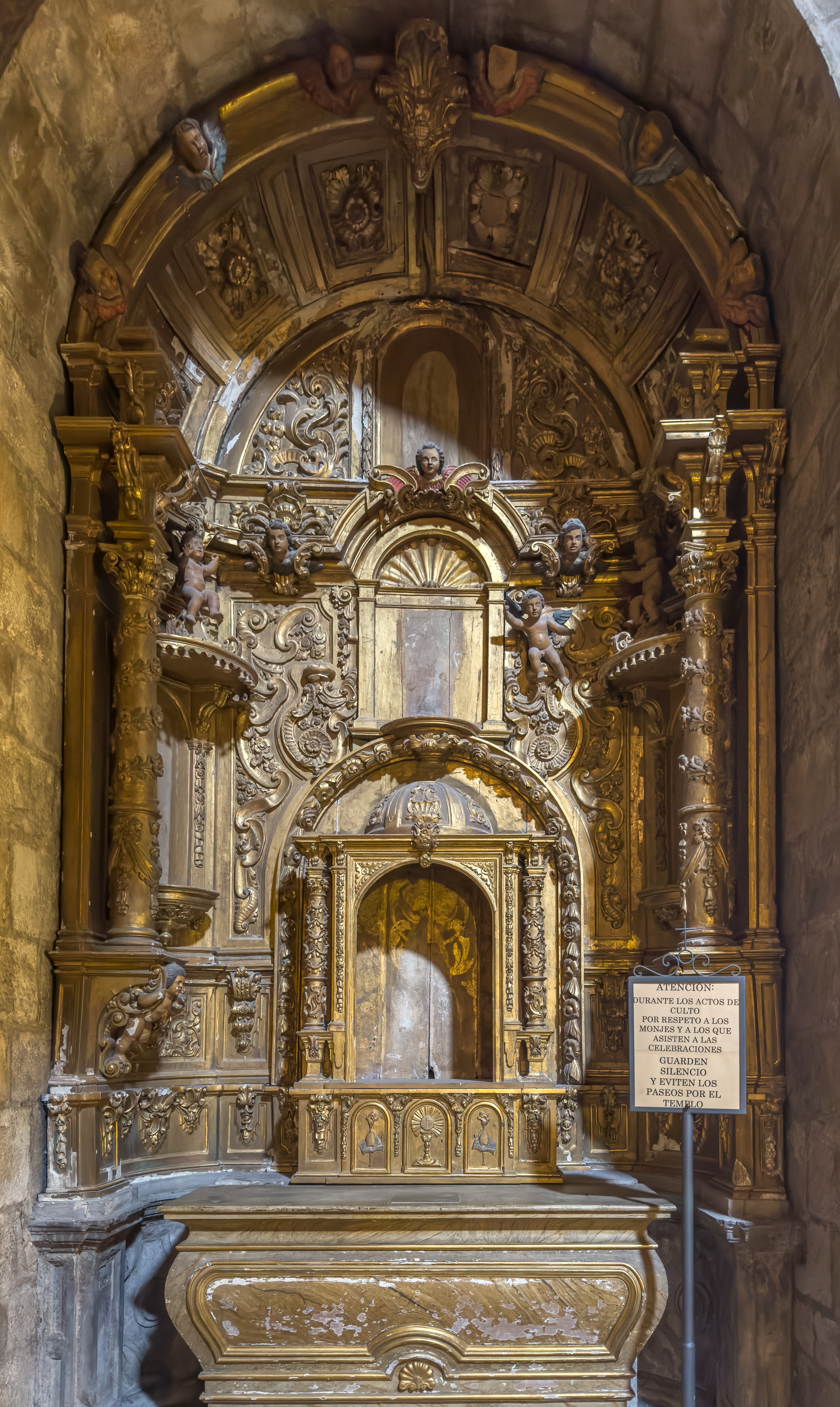

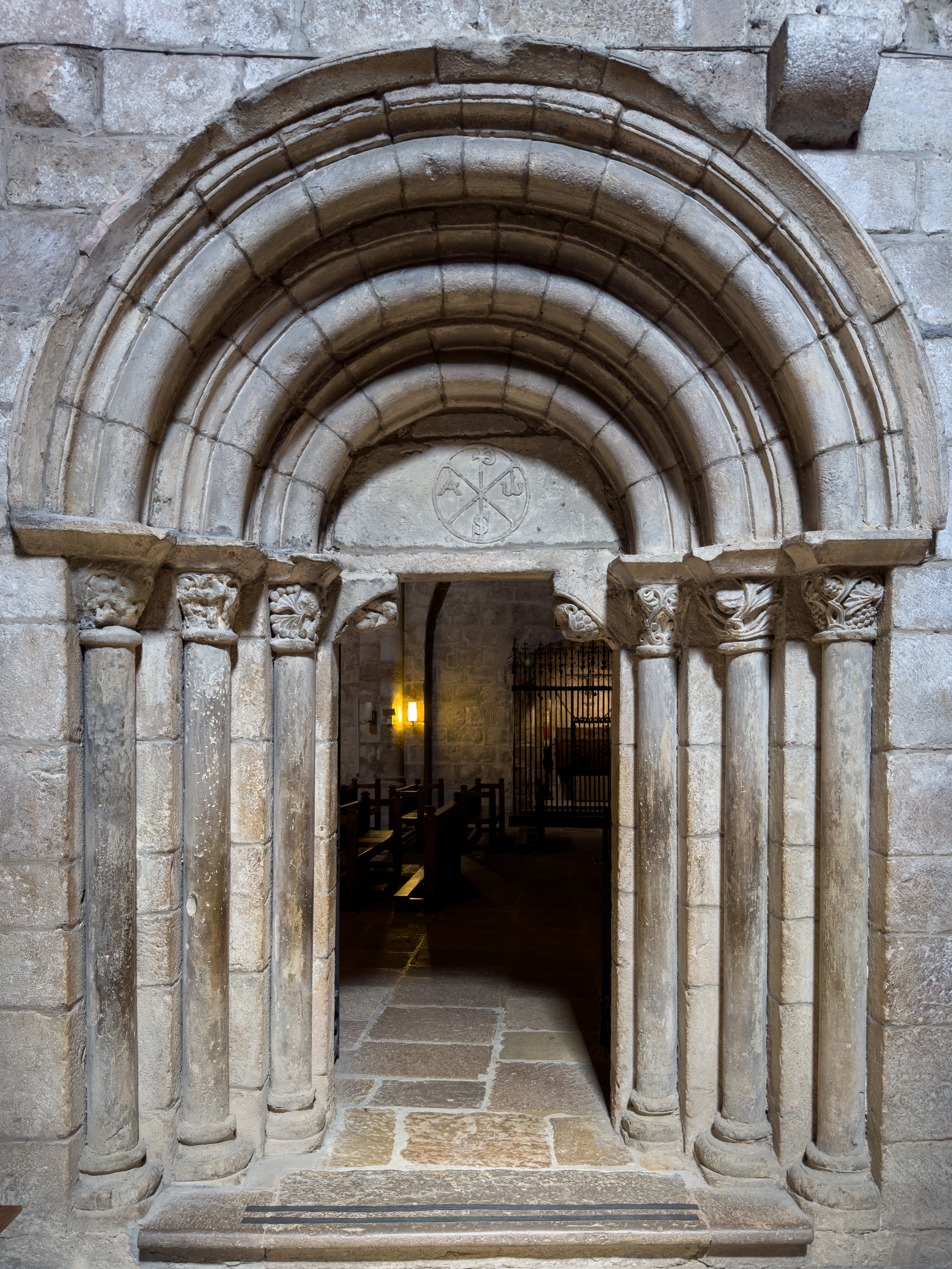

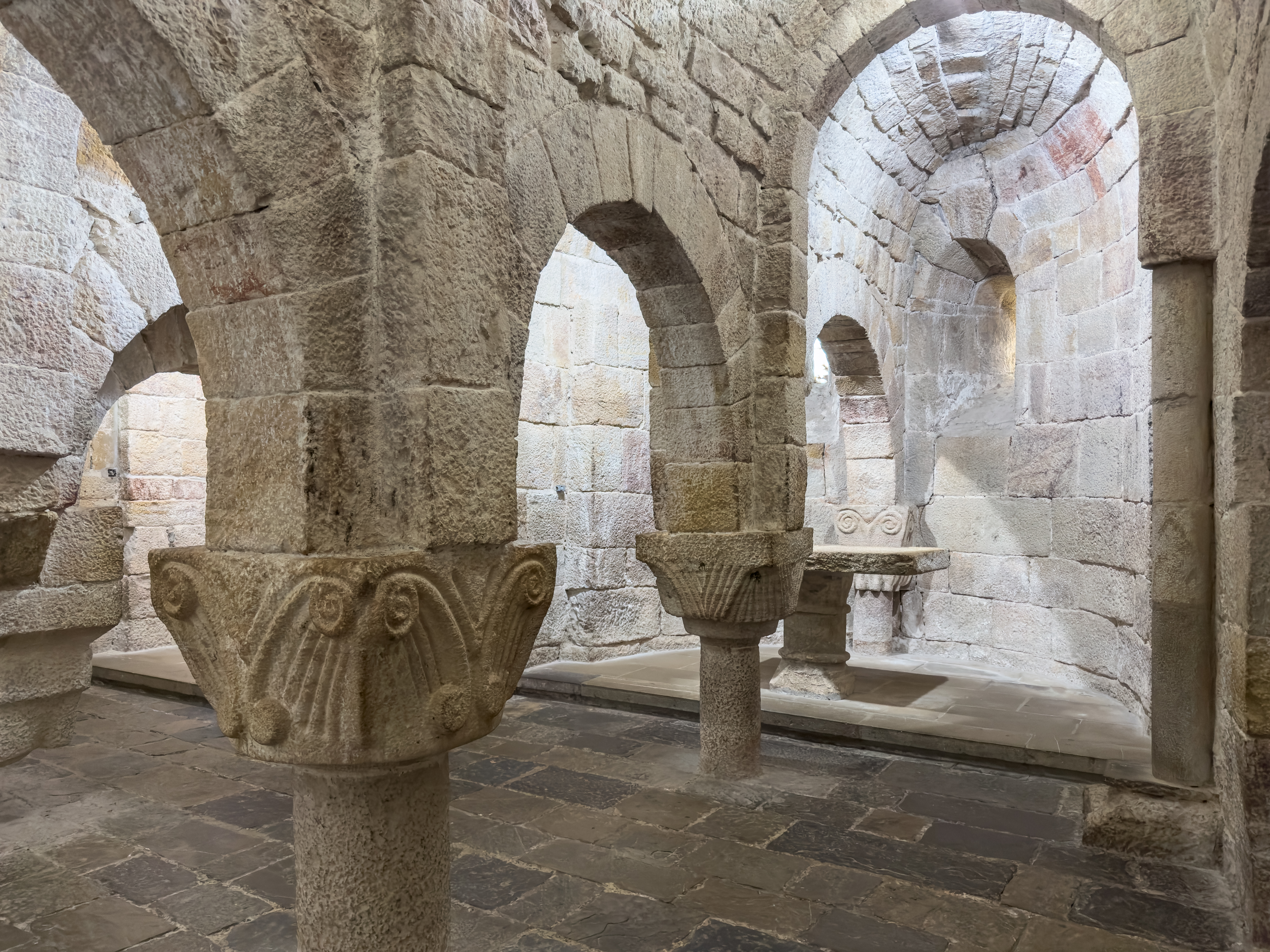

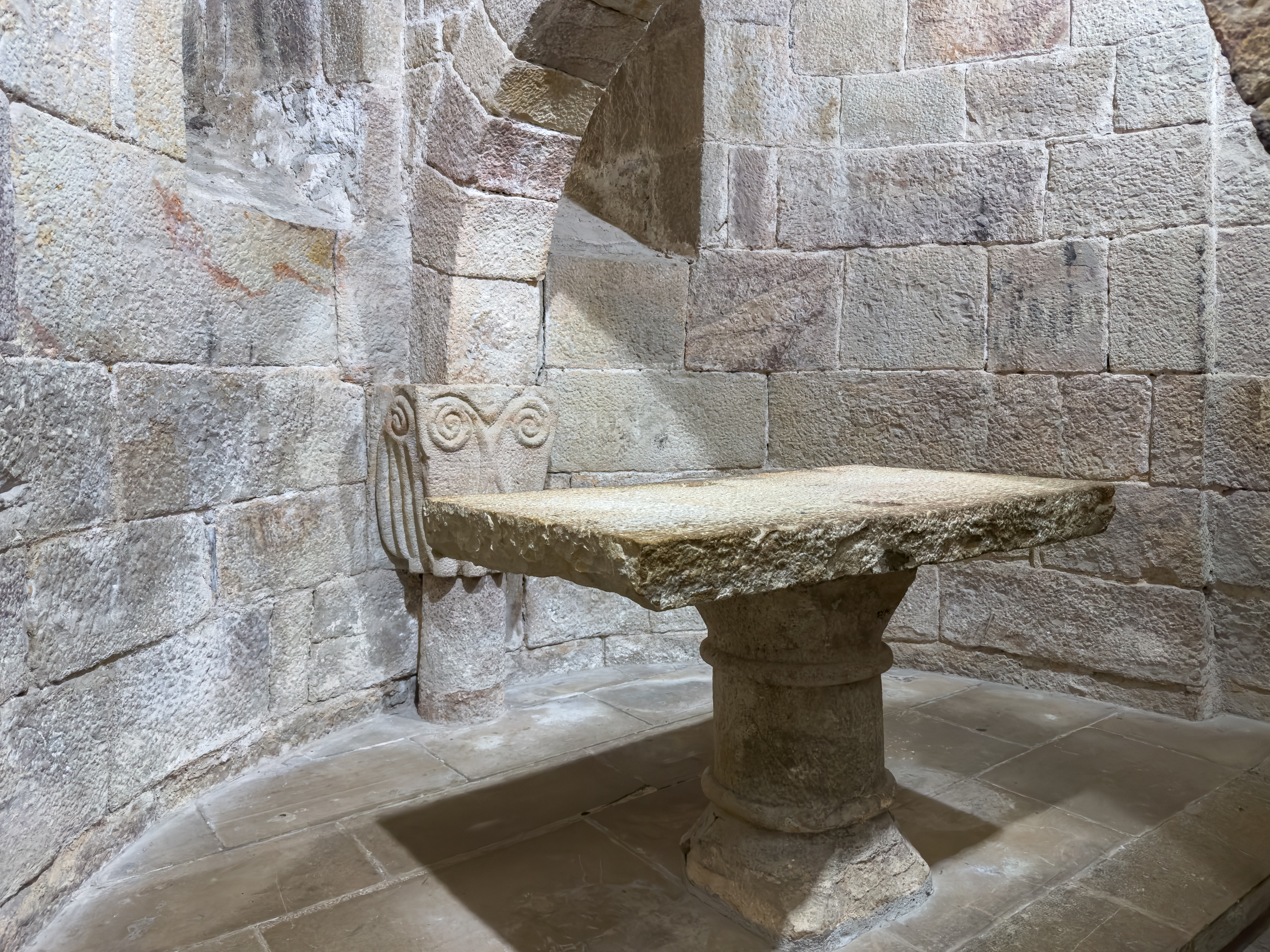

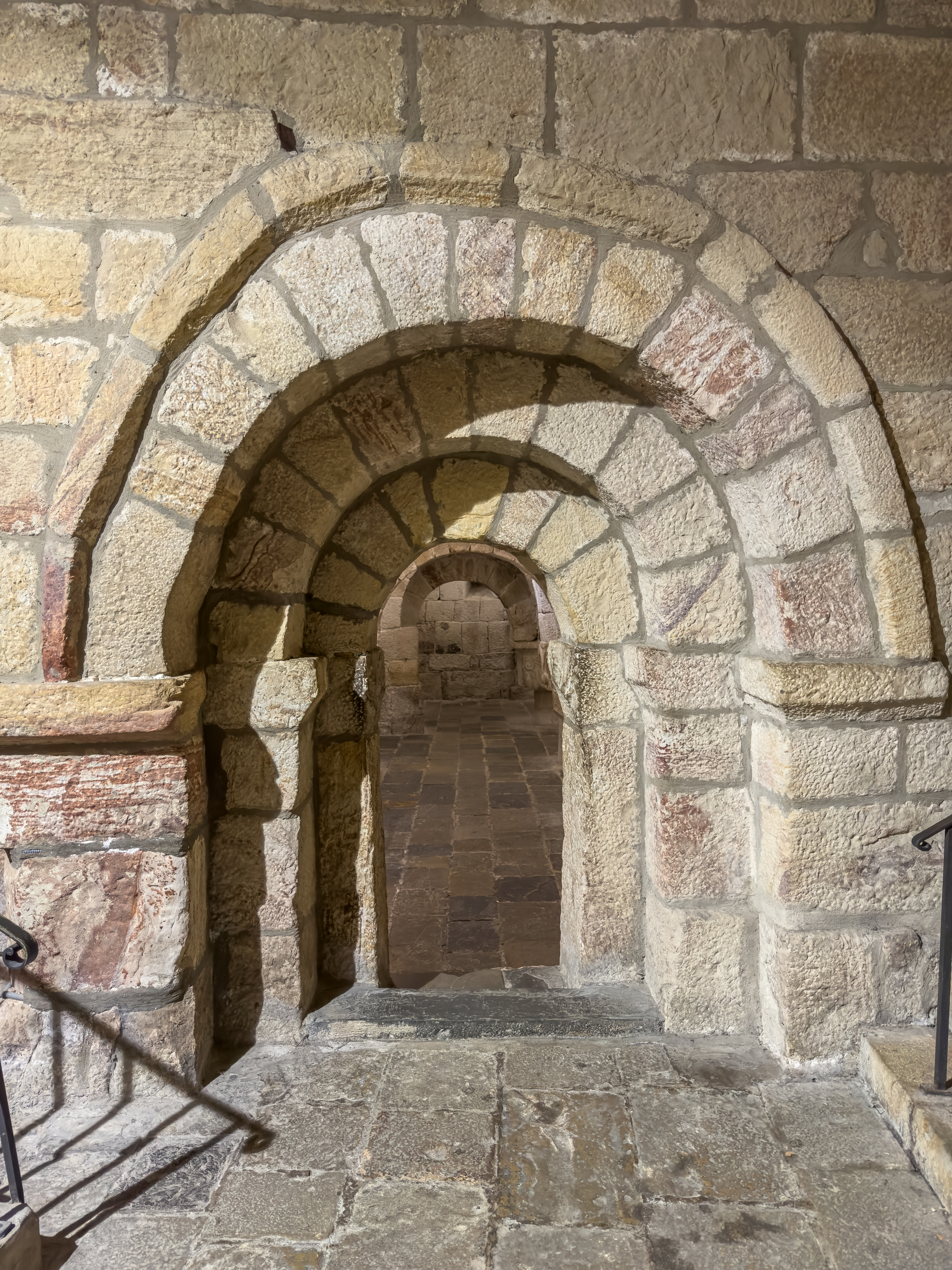

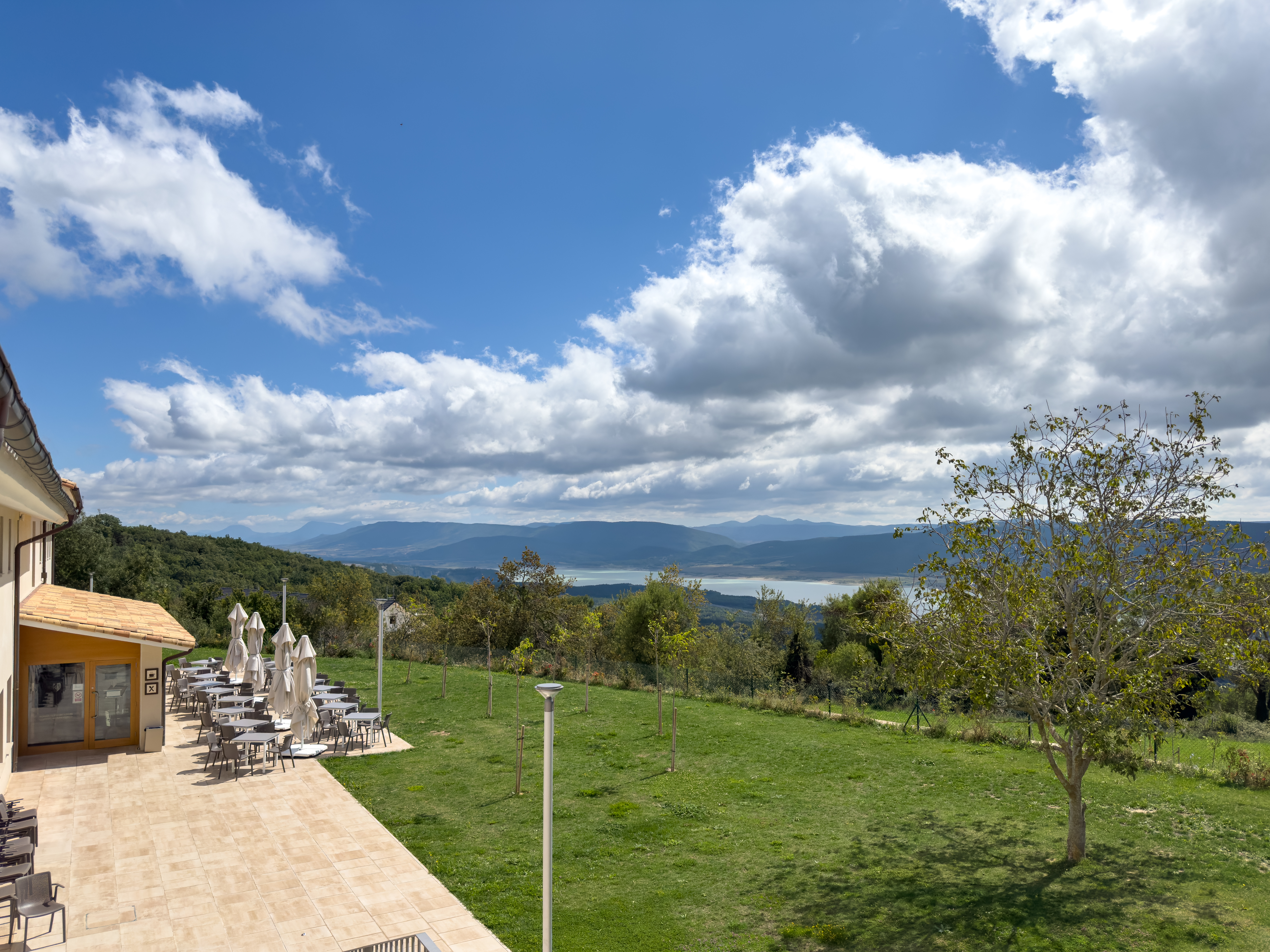

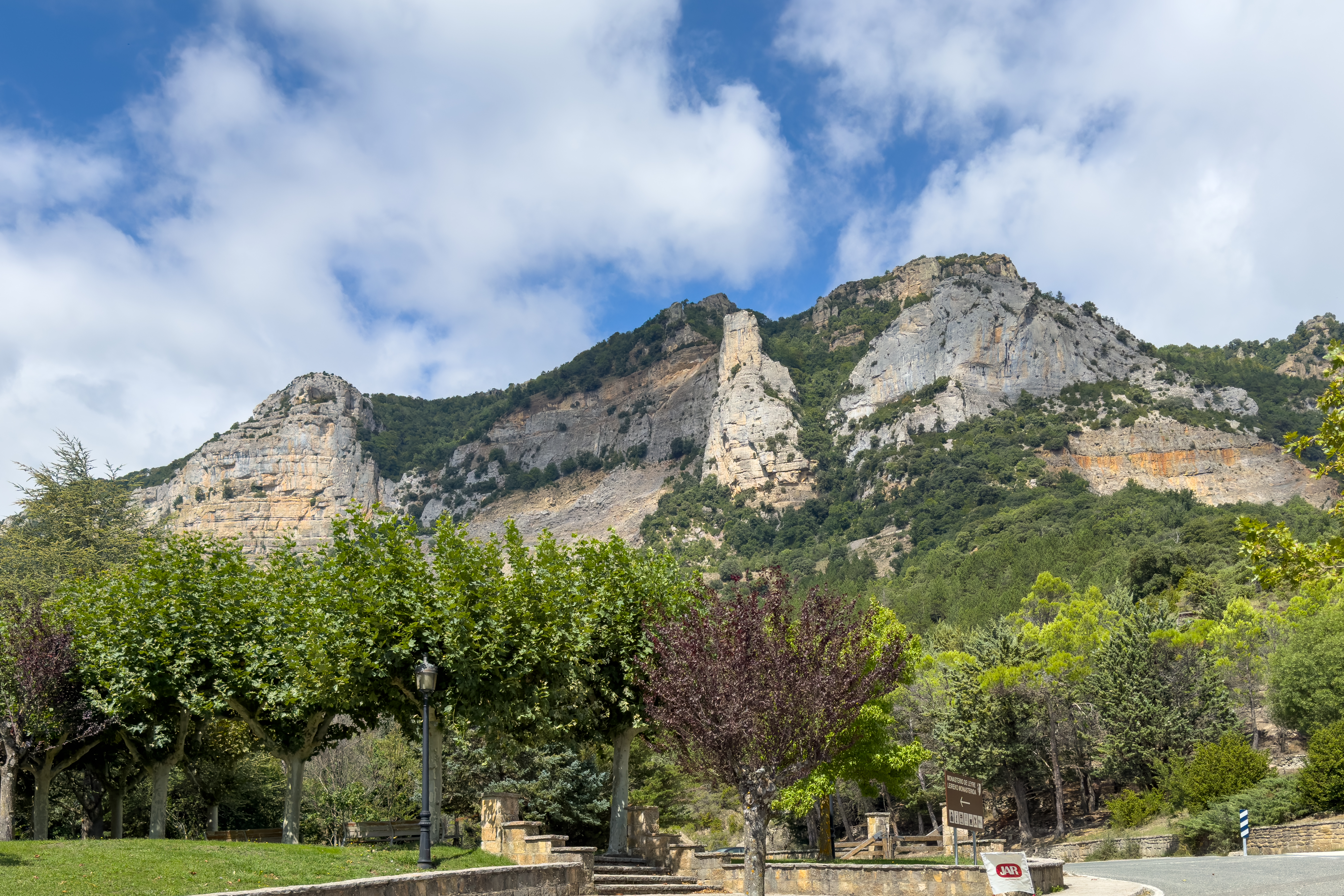
