= Katrien Meire =

Belgian lawyer, chief executive

CEO of Sheffield Wednesday
- In office January 2018 – February 2019

CEO of Charlton Athletic
- In office January 2014 – December 2017

Personal details
- Born: Tongeren, Belgium
- Occupation: Businesswoman, lawyer

Katrien Meire (born 7 July 1984) is a Belgian lawyer. She was formerly the chief executive of Sheffield Wednesday from 2018 to 2019, and the chief executive of Charlton Athletic from 2014 to 2017. Her time at Charlton coincided with widespread supporter protests and dissatisfaction and relegation to EFL League One.

== Early career ==
Meire studied law at University of Leuven, completing her LLM in 2007. She continued her studies in Competition Law at University College London for a further year. She has worked for law firms Olswang and Baker & McKenzie in the area of competition law, particularly mergers and acquisitions and cartels. In 2016, Meire was awarded the VRG-Alumniprijs.

== Football ==
In 2011, Meire provided legal advice to Roland Duchâtelet, involving TV rights issues with Sint-Truidense V.V.; Meire is a supporter of Sint-Truiden. Meire's involvement in football continued when she worked as the "Legal and International Relations Manager" for Standard Liège, another club owned by Duchâtelet.

=== Charlton Athletic ===
After Duchâtelet's purchase of Charlton Athletic in 2014, Meire was appointed as the Chief Executive of the club. She was one of only a few female club executives at the time. Meire commented on this saying that she didn't believe she was treated differently for being a female chief executive, adding that "people are quite receptive to the idea of a woman chief executive."

In September 2016, season ticket sales had fallen to 6,297, from 10,278 at the same time the previous year. In January 2015, Meire was confronted on a train about the appointment of manager Guy Luzon after Charlton lost 5–0 to Watford; Meire claimed that there were 20 applicants for the job, including former Charlton manager Alan Curbishley. After the incident, Meire said fans should "accept how we run the club".

That same year, Meire was appointed as one of four Football League representatives to the FA Council. She was subsequently re-elected the following summer, in August 2017.

In May 2016, Meire claimed she had received "extreme abuse" from Charlton fans, particularly after the club's relegation to League One for the 2016–17 season; some fans turned up to Meire's parents' house in Belgium, and she also claimed some supporters had committed criminal offences against her. A few days beforehand, there had been protests aimed at Meire during Charlton's last match of the 2015–16 season when she was branded a 'liar' by the club's supporters for a series of unfortunate statements which were all subsequently proven to be false.

During her time running Charlton, the club underwent eight managerial changes and was relegated to League One, the third tier of English football. The club were particularly unsuccessful in the transfer market during her tenure in the club. Underselling a whole host of talented English players, without sell on fees negotiated, and over paying for failed foreign players. Nick Pope broke into the first team during the 2015–16 season before being sold to Burnley for £1 million, and then becoming an England international within two years. Ademola Lookman was sold to Everton for a divisional record of £7.9 million during the 2016–17 season, having made a name for himself the previous season following a breakthrough from the club's academy. The sales were credited with Charlton announcing their first profit in thirteen years, after the two previous seasons having increased losses.

Meire left her Charlton Chief Executive role at the end of December 2017.

=== Sheffield Wednesday ===
On 1 January 2018, Meire was named Chief Executive of Sheffield Wednesday, with the club then in 16th position in the Championship. She has been described as a 'steady influence' at the club'. Meire has credited this to the fact she is "away from the forefront of the club compared to my previous club". On 11 February 2019, Meire and the club announced in a statement that she had vacated her role as chief executive officer. Meire praised the "fantastic support" of the club's fanbase, and told the club's website that she "felt a warm welcome from everyone at the club and the fans at games and around the city". In December 2019, Meire and chairman Dejphon Chansiri were charged by the EFL with misconduct relating to the sale of Hillsborough during her spell as CEO to Chansiri for £60m. The move enabled Wednesday to post a small operating profit and avoid possible penalties for exceeding FFP regulations. In March 2020 the EFL dropped the charges against the individuals, but the case against the football club is still ongoing.
