= Leire (given name) =

Female given name

- Gender: Female

Origin
- Origin: Basque
- Region of origin: Navarre, Spain

Other names
- Variant form: Leyre

Leire is a Basque feminine given name that is derived from the name of the Monastery of San Salvador of Leyre in Navarre, Spain. It was among the top 10 most popular names given to newborn girls in Basque Country in Spain in 2011.

== Notable people with the name ==
- Leire Aramendia (born 1993), handballer
- Leire Baños (born 1996), footballer
- Leire Iglesias (born 1978), judoka
- Leire Landa (born 1986), footballer
- Leire Martínez (born 1979), singer and musician
- Leire Morlans (born 1987), skier
- Leire Olaberria (born 1977), cyclist
- Leire Pajín (born 1976), politician
- Leire Santos (born 1979), diver
