= Manuel do Cenáculo =

18th-century Portuguese prelate and antiquarian

His Most Reverend Excellency D. Frei Manuel do Cenáculo T.O.R.
- Archbishop of Évora
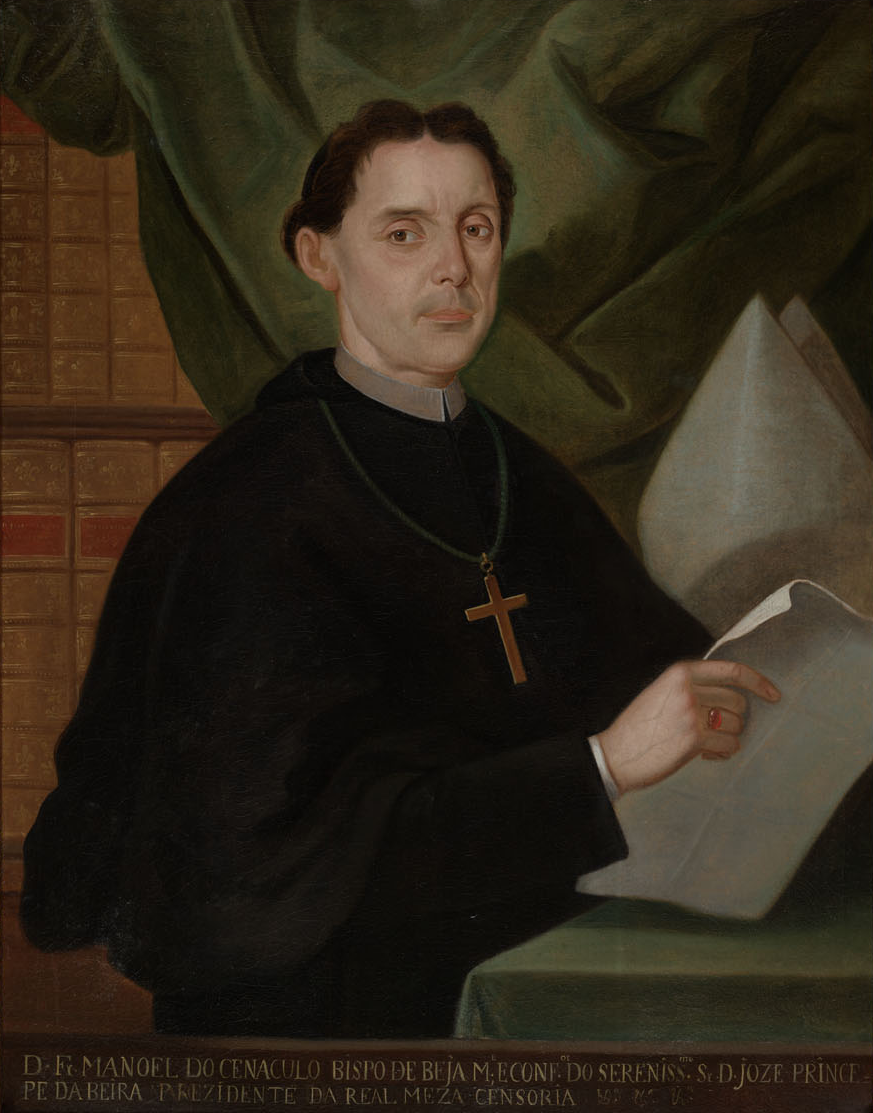
- Portrait of Frei Manuel do Cenáculo, National Library of Portugal
- Church: Roman Catholic Church
- Diocese: Archdiocese of Évora
- Appointed: 16 March 1802
- Installed: 9 August 1802
- Term ended: 26 January 1814
- Other post: Bishop of Beja (1770–1802)

Orders
- Ordination: 4 April 1747
- Consecration: 28 October 1770 by Francisco de Saldanha da Gama

Personal details
- Born: Manuel de Vilas-Boas Anes de Carvalho; 1 March 1724 Lisbon, Portugal
- Died: 26 January 1814 (aged 89) Évora, Portugal
- Buried: Church of the Holy Spirit, Évora
- Education: University of Coimbra

Styles of Frei Manuel do Cenáculo
- Reference style: His Most Reverend Excellency
- Spoken style: Your Most Reverend Excellency
- Religious style: Frei Manuel

Dom Frei Manuel do Cenáculo, T.O.R. (né Manuel de Vilas-Boas Anes de Carvalho; 1 March 1724 – 26 January 1814) was a Portuguese Franciscan prelate, who served as the first Bishop of Beja (1770–1802) and as Archbishop of Évora (1802–1814).

One of the country's leading intellectuals at the time, Manuel do Cenáculo was aligned with the novel ideas of the Enlightenment and the Pombaline reforms of public instruction in Portugal: he played a leading role in the reform of the University of Coimbra, he directed the Royal Censorship Board (with which deposits he for the first time proposed to create a national library), and gathered a vast collection of books, antiquities, and works of art.

Following Pombal's fall from grace in 1777, Manuel do Cenáculo lost much of his influence at court and directed his attention to ecclesiastical life while, at the same time, spearheading the creation of public schools, libraries, and academies across the country; chief among them are the Évora Public Library, the Library of the Lisbon Academy of Sciences, and the art and archaeology collection that nowadays comprises the Frei Manuel do Cenáculo National Museum.

== Early life ==
Of humble origins, Manuel de Vilas-Boas Anes de Carvalho was born in Lisbon, the son of José Martins, a metalsmith from the village of Constantim in Vila Real, and Antónia Maria. He was brought up in the spirit of the prevalent Christian principles and values: his mother was the first to educate him in religion, instilling in him the virtues of charity and piety; his paternal uncle, Caetano Jerónimo, was a familiar of the Holy Office of the Inquisition. According to Francisco Manuel Trigoso writing shortly after Manuel do Cenáculo's death, the seemingly unassuming family had illustrious forebears. Cenáculo showed a great deal of ingenuousness about his upbringing: Father José Agostinho de Macedo once inquired about a scar on his face and he candidly replied that it was a burn from a spark that had generated as his father was hammering a red-hot iron rod on an anvil.

He would have learned how to read and write in his parish church, as primary education was then usually entrusted to the parish priest. At age 16, he took vows in the Third Order of Saint Francis, in the Convent of Our Lady of Jesus in Lisbon. After first studies in the Humanities, he earned a doctorate in Theology from the University of Coimbra (26 May 1749); he soon started teaching at the College of the Arts in Coimbra and, later, Theology at the University.

In 1750, he travelled to Rome in the entourage of Frei Joaquim de São José for the General Chapter of the Franciscan Order, which coincided with a jubilee year; this meant Manuel do Cenáculo had ample opportunity to meet several distinguished individualities, among them leading scholar and historian Ludovico Antonio Muratori. The atmosphere in Rome was one of great transformation as even Pope Benedict XIV was promoting the implementation of modern teaching reforms. By his own admission, this voyage, with its many visits to libraries, museums, universities and direct contact with many foreign thinkers, left a lasting impression on his ideas on culture and teaching; the Enlightenment principles would be fully incorporated in his later activities as a reformer and as a pedagogue. Around this time, he also developed an interest in Oriental languages, and became fluent in Syriac and Arabic, as he was already in Greek.

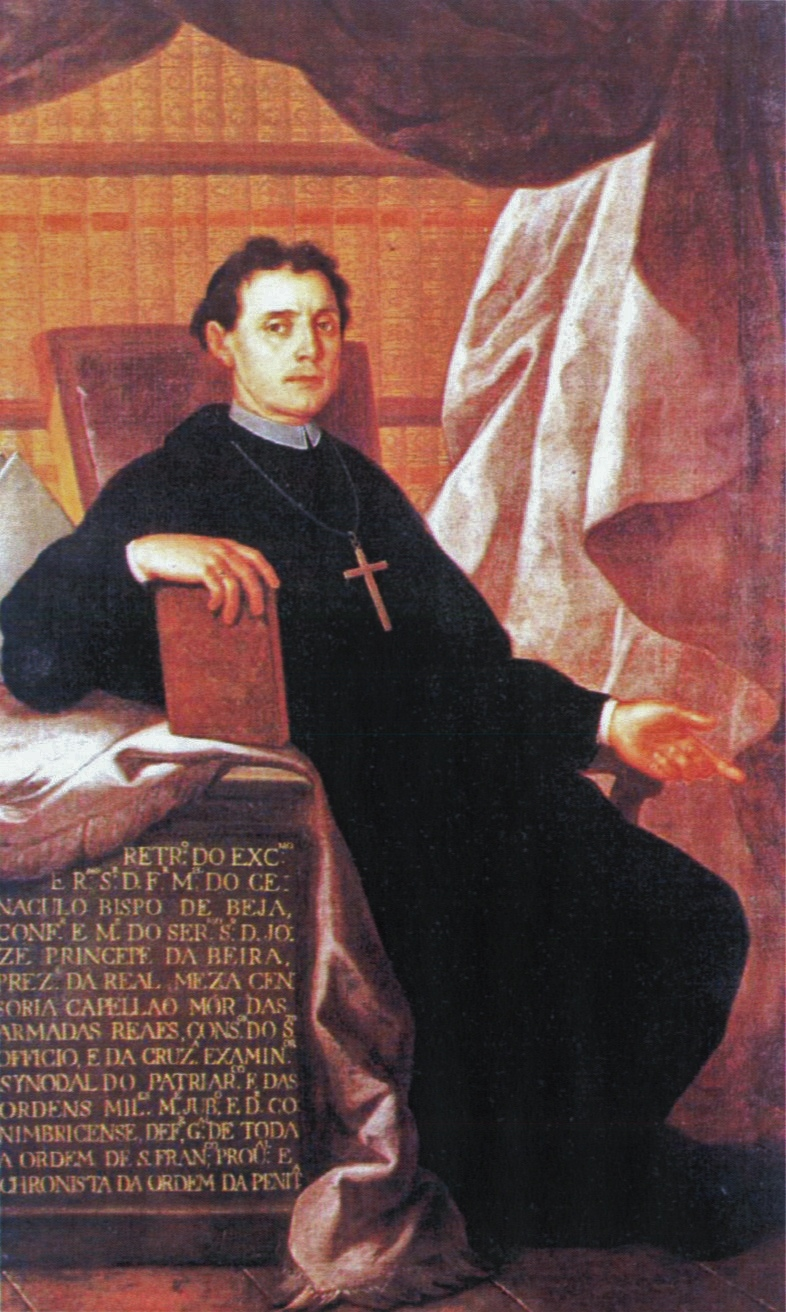
Portrait of Frei Manuel do Cenáculo, 1771, by António Joaquim Padrão (Lisbon Academy of Sciences)

Upon his return to Portugal in 1751, he published Conclusiones de Logicæ ("Conclusions on Logic"), which became the first wide-ranging official Franciscan essay published in the country, applying modern philosophical ideas to the teaching of Logic; his consideration of History as a propaedeutic to Philosophy already shows the influence of Johann Jakob Brucker's chief work Historia Critica Philosophiæ ("Critical History of Philosophy").

In 1768, he was elected Provincial of the Third Order of Saint Francis in Portugal. At the time, the country was ruled by the Marquis of Pombal as an enlightened despot, the chief minister of King Joseph I. Pombal's views on education as an affair of the State meant science and technology ought to be completely secularised and reformed. Pombal took advantage of Manuel do Cenáculo's valuable intelligence and innovative pedagogical ideas and appointed him to various political and administrative offices related to education and culture: in 1769, he appointed him the confessor (and, later, tutor) to the king's grandson and heir apparent, Joseph, Prince of Brazil; in 1770, President of the Board of Literary Providence (Junta da Providencia Literária), created for the reform of public instruction; in 1772, President of the Board of the Literary Subsidy (Junta do Subsídio Literário).

== Bishop of Beja ==
In 1770, Pope Clement XIV restored the ancient Diocese of Beja (the modern name of the Dioecesis Pacensis, or Diocese of Pax Julia), which had been suppressed following the Umayyad conquest of Hispania in the 8th century AD. Manuel do Cenáculo was appointed the first bishop of the newly restored diocese in March of that year, and was consecrated on 28 October by Cardinal-Patriarch Francisco de Saldanha da Gama, in the chapel of the Royal Palace of Ajuda. He, however, remained at court in Lisbon.

In 1777, the death of King Joseph I meant the accession of his eldest daughter and heiress Queen Maria I: in a period that became known as "the Turnabout" ("a Viradeira"), the Marquis of Pombal and his political allies all fell from power — as the fervently religious Maria I was staunchly opposed to Pombal and his policies. Manuel do Cenáculo soon was banished to his bishopric in Beja, where he stayed for the next twenty-five years. As Bishop of Beja, he was a great promoter of culture and education: he was an assiduous presence in many learned societies and conferences; he set up a public course of the Humanities and Theology in his own Episcopal Palace; he sponsored the education of poor boys from the mountains in Ourique so that they could return to their villages and promote the literacy of the population; he paid for Latin tutors and schoolteachers in remote villages. Notably, he also promoted the training of Mestras de Meninas ("teachers for girls") which constituted a first step towards institutionalised education for women (only officially established in the country in 1815).

Through his connections with many scholars in Spain, France, Italy, and elsewhere in Europe, during this time, Manuel do Cenáculo greatly expanded his collection of antiquities; to this also contributed the many ancient artefacts retrieved in his pioneering archaeological surveys in Beja. Because the collection comprised many unwieldy artefacts that could not be conveniently displayed in a library or cabinet of curiosities, Manuel do Cenáculo chose a nearby church dedicated to Saint Sisenandus of Beja and repurposed it into a museum, the Museu Sisenando Cenaculano Pacense (referring to the saint, to himself, and to the ancient Roman name of the city of Beja, Pax Julia).

== Archbishop of Évora ==
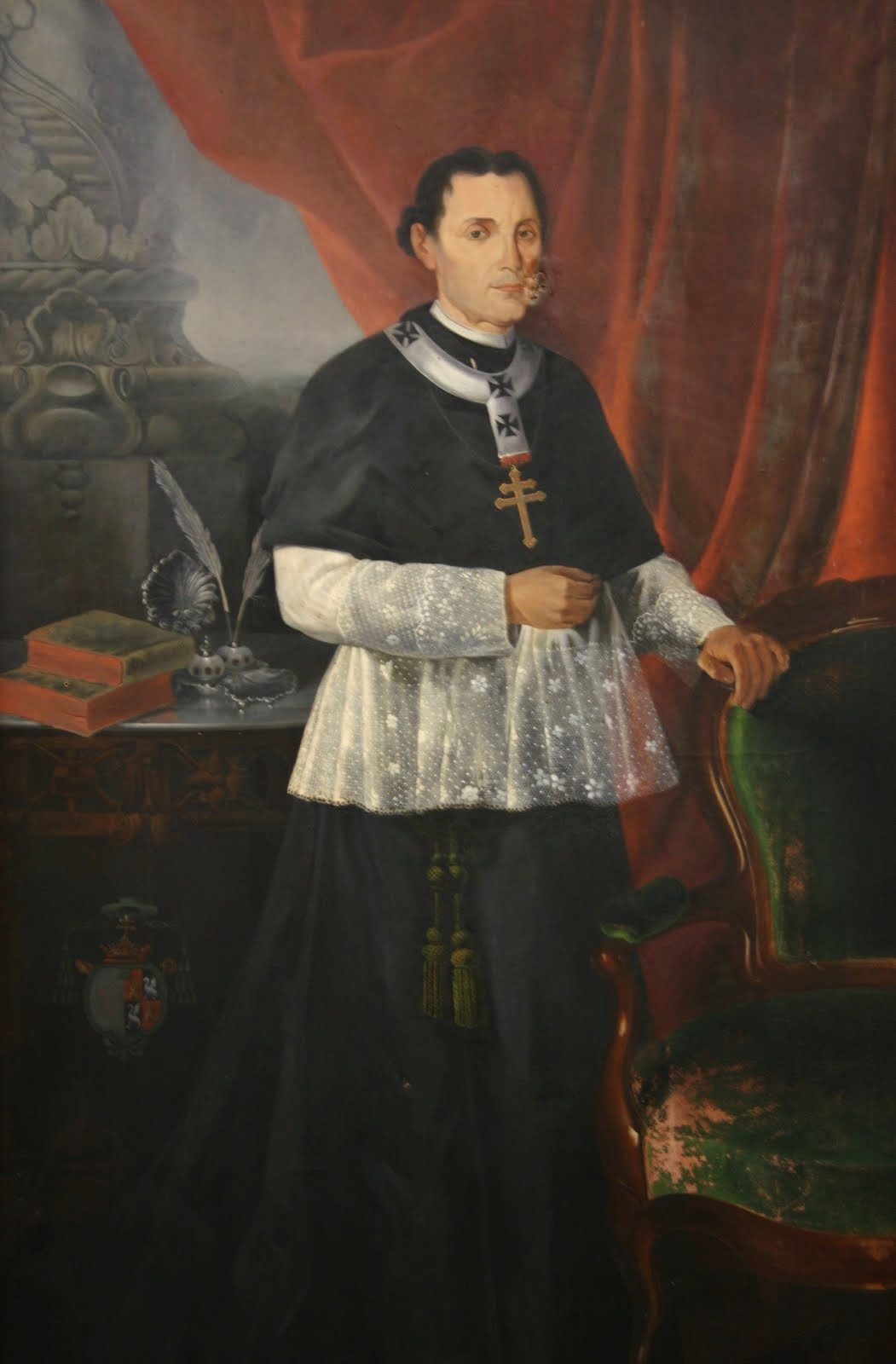
Portrait of Frei Manuel do Cenáculo, Évora Public Library

In 1802, following the death of Archbishop Joaquim Xavier Botelho de Lima, the government of John, Prince Regent appointed Manuel do Cenáculo to the vacant metropolitan archbishopric of Évora, all resentments toward the allies of the Marquis of Pombal long past. In Évora, he also diligently promoted public education by creating a public library and museum, and having his precious collection of antiquities available for public fruition.

He was in Évora in 1807, setting up courses in ecclesiastical history, Biblical theology, polemics, and morals, when these were interrupted by the Napoleonic invasion of Portugal in the context of the Peninsular War. As the Portuguese revolted against the French occupying forces, Évora's poorly-armed townsmen and militias were slaughtered in a short battle in July 1808 and the city was brutally sacked by the troops of Louis Henri Loison. Archbishop Manuel do Cenáculo, at that point aged 85, refused Spanish colonel Frederico Moretti's suggestion to flee the city as it became apparent the French forces had won the battle; as the troops stormed the Cathedral (shooting a chaplain, and throwing grenades that killed several people gathering there), the Archbishop rose from the cathedra and, held at bayonet point, humbly capitulated, begging them to spare the lives of his flock. After seeing the Archepiscopal Palace occupied and sacked, especially his natural history museum and his library, and between violent threats and insults, Manuel do Cenáculo was arrested by the French and carried to prison in Beja, where he remained without recognising the authority of the new regency.

After the Battle of Vimeiro in August put an end to the French invasion, there were instructions issued in the name of John, Prince Regent to restitute the Archbishop to his diocese in the most dignified way possible: Manuel do Cenáculo made his solemn re-entrance in Évora on 17 October 1808, escorted by a guard of honour comprising the Regiments of Estremoz, Évora, Olivença, and Moura, and was welcomed back with cheers, the chime of the bells, and pyrotechnics.

On the last three years of his life, he started to lose his eyesight and he grew debilitated in his physical strength and his intellectual faculties. He died on 26 January 1814; shortly afterwards, on 24 June, Francisco Manuel Trigoso delivered a Historical Praise of Frei Manuel do Cenáculo (Elogio Histórico de Fr. Manuel do Cenáculo) during a public session of the Royal Academy of Sciences, of which Manuel do Cenáculo had been an honorary member.

He was buried under a plain ledgerstone in the sacristy of the Church of the Holy Spirit in Évora, annexed to the Jesuit College of the Holy Spirit, which today houses the University of Évora. It is inscribed:

Aeternae memoriae sacrum / D. D. Fr. Emmanuelis a Coe- / naculo Villas Boas ter- / tii Ordinis S. Francisci / alumni, primum Episcopi / Julio-Pacensis, postremo / Archiepiscopi Eborensis: / qui ob sedulam ac diutur- / nam operam, sive in Serenis- / simo Brasiliae Principe / D. Iozepho instituendo; si- / ve in re litteraria apud so- / dales et concives ad novam / quasi viram revocanda; si- / ve in aliis magnisque Rei- / publicae et Ecclesiae mu- / neribus integerrime obe- / undis; pietate duce ac Doc- / trina, Religionem et Pa- / triam sibi perenniter de- / vinxit. Obiit VII. Kal. Febr. / CIↃDCCCXIV aetatis suae / anno XC. Pontificatus XLIV. / Desideratissimo praesu- / li bene merenti posuit / Antonius Iosephus Olive- / rius.

== Legacy ==
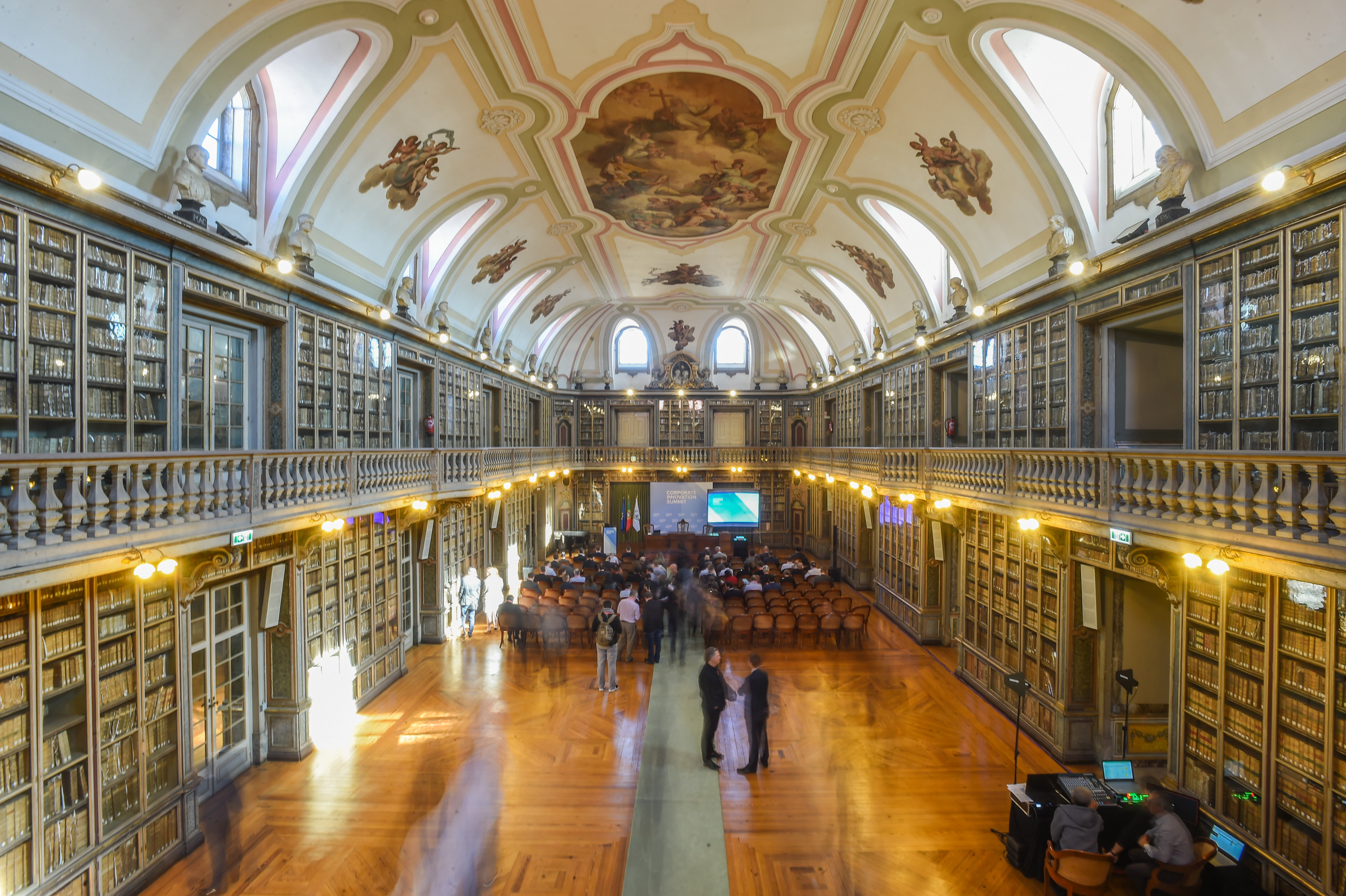
The Library of the Lisbon Academy of Sciences (originally belonging to the Convent of Our Lady of Jesus), was endowed by Manuel do Cenáculo

Manuel do Cenáculo was one of the most prolific writers of his time, on a vast array of subjects. Among them, a work in defence of the educational reform doctrines of Luís António Verney, the great enemy of the methods of the Jesuits; a dissertation on the definability of the dogma of the Immaculate Conception of Mary (only defined after Cenáculo's death by Pope Pius IX in Ineffabilis Deus, 1854); Memórias Históricas do Ministério do Púlpito ("Historical Memoirs on the Ministry of the Pulpit", 1776), one of his most celebrated works, a contribution of great importance to the history of religious oratory in Portugal; Cuidados Literários do Prelado de Beja em Graça do seu Bispado ("Literary Cares of the Prelate of Beja on the Behalf of his Bishopric", 1791), detailing his pedagogical concerns and his archaeological endeavours in the south of the country.

As bishop and archbishop, he published twenty-eight pastorals on different subjects; while Provincial of the Third Order of Saint Francis in Portugal, he wrote important dispositions on regular observance and instruction (1790), and an extensive historical memoir (1794) of that religious congregation. These documents show Manuel do Cenáculo's views on the importance of an instructed clergy as an agent for the modernisation of the economy and of society as a whole, thoughts that are in keeping with his Enlightenment ideals.

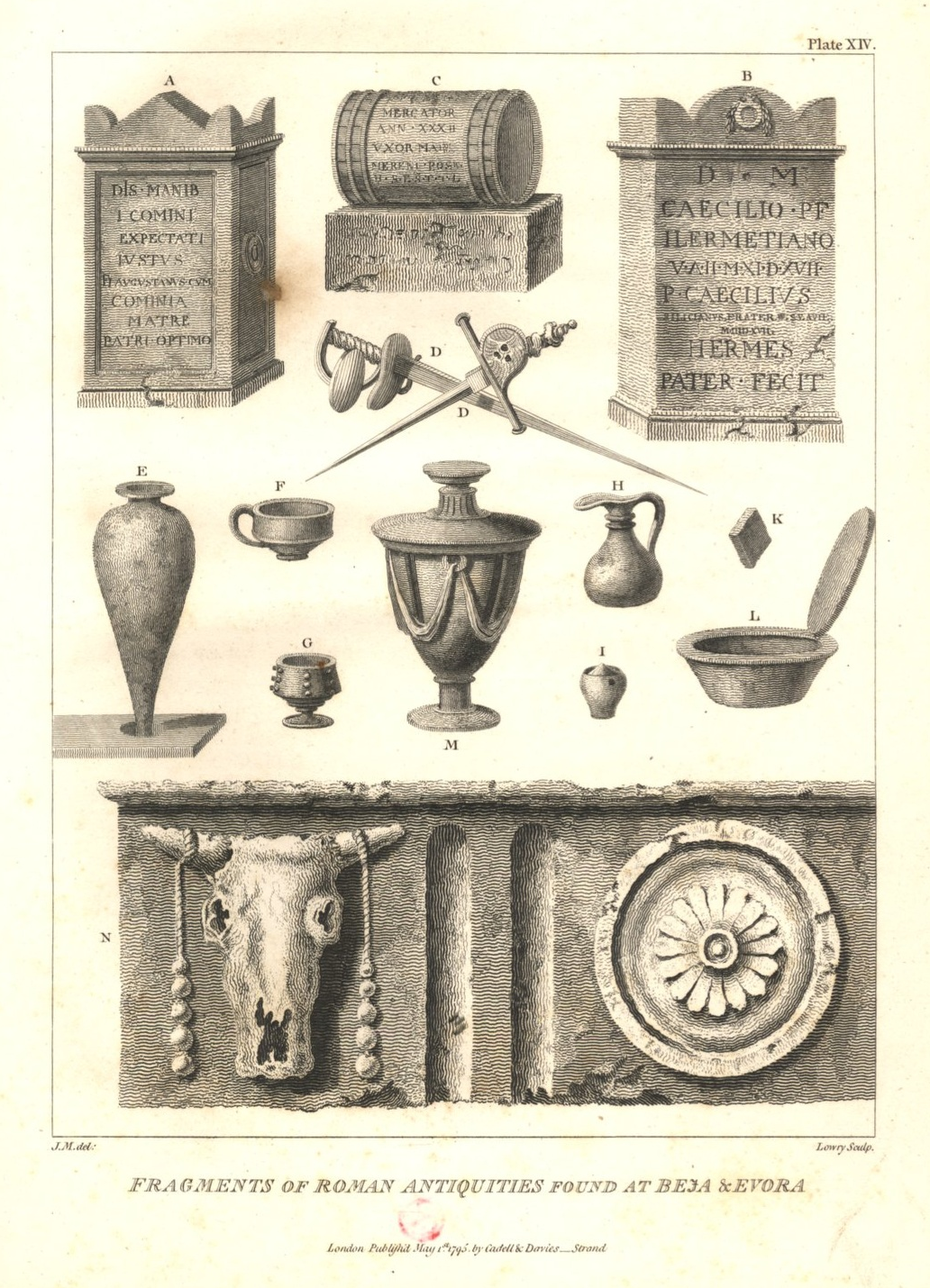
Ancient Roman artefacts seen in Beja and Évora by James Cavanah Murphy and published in his Travels in Portugal (1795)

A recurring theme in Manuel do Cenáculo's writings is that libraries constitute a privileged means to further the cause of education, and striving to establish them is therefore a patriotic duty when such efforts are guided by the love of knowledge and public usefulness. Cenáculo was well-versed in the most widely circulated bibliothecography treatises of his time, such as those of Pierre Le Gallois (Traité des plus belles bibliothèques de l'Europe, 1680), Daniel Georg Morhof (Polyhistor, sive de auctorum notitia et rerum commentarii, 1707), and Johannes Lomeier (De bibliothecis liber singularis, 1680). One of his greatest legacies remains his close association with the creation of what still are some of the most important public libraries in Portugal: he was the first to devise the Royal Public Library of Lisbon (the modern-day National Library of Portugal), he endowed the Convent of Our Lady of Jesus in Lisbon with a condign library (this is now the Library of the Lisbon Academy of Sciences), and founded Évora Public Library. He is also credited with suggesting Diogo Barbosa Machado, the author of first great bibliographical reference book published in Portugal (Bibliotheca Lusitana) and founder of the Royal Academy of Portuguese History, to donate his valuable personal library to King Joseph I, to make up for the loss of the Royal Library in the 1755 Lisbon earthquake.

Manuel do Cenáculo's important antiquities collection in Évora was severely depauperated during the Napoleonic invasions of Portugal during the Peninsular War, still during his lifetime. This did not prevent Emil Hübner on remarking on the importance and worth of the surviving collection. Fortunately, Cenáculo had Félix Caetano da Silva draw faithful reproductions of his every epigraphic specimen; these have survived to this day in the collections of the Évora Public Library.

Manuel do Cenáculo was very well-connected with leading intellectuals in Europe; his collected correspondence of more than five-thousand letters is kept at the Évora Public Library, where a significant amount of the drafts of Cenáculo's replies are also preserved. Gabriel Pereira, in his important reference work on the local history of Évora, Estudos Eborenses (1886–96), writes: "Cenáculo's correspondence fills an entire cabinet; among these stacks of letters, there are precious autographs; the great archbishop corresponded with scholars, artists, bibliophiles, princes, humble friars and missionaries; hundreds of protégés in all social strata in Spain, Italy, India, Brazil."

Catholic Church titles
Preceded by New title (diocese restored)	Bishop of Beja; 1770–1802	Succeeded by Francisco Leitão de Carvalho, O.Cist.
Preceded by Joaquim Xavier Botelho de Lima	Archbishop of Évora; 1802–1814	Succeeded by Joaquim de Santa Clara Brandão, O.S.B.
