= Simplicia gens =

Ancient Roman family

The gens Simplicia was a minor plebeian family at ancient Rome. Members of this gens are known from inscriptions dating to the imperial period, most occurring without praenomina from the third century onward, and in many instances their full nomenclature is uncertain. Some of them were from senatorial families, and one of the Simplicii was Praefectus Urbi of Constantinople in AD 403.

== Origin ==
The nomen Simplicius belongs to a class of gentilicia formed from surnames ending in -ex or -icus, using the gentile-forming suffix -icius. Its root is the cognomen Simplex, originally referring to someone "simple" or "unadorned" in character or manner. Surnames derived from the nature and habits of an individual were common at Rome.

== Members ==
- Simplicia, dedicated a tomb at Aquileia in Venetia and Histria to her husband, Getulicus, aged seventy years, seven days, five and a half hours.
- Simplicia, buried at Aquileia, along with her husband, Martinianus, and their children.
- Simplicia, the wife of Vincentius, with whom she dedicated a fourth-century tomb at Aquileia for their daughter, Petronia, aged sixteen.
- Simplicia, buried at Augusta Treverorum in Gallia Belgica, with a monument from her mother, Ursa.
- Simplicia, dedicated a tomb at Augusta Vindelicorum in Raetia, dating between AD 170 and 300, for her husband, Tiberius Acutianus Ursacius Veteranicinus, aged twenty-seven years, six months, and eight days.
- Simplicia, buried at Carthage in Africa Proconsularis.
- Simplicia, buried at Carpis in Africa Proconsularis, aged seventeen.
- Simplicia, made an offering to Mars Corotiacus at the present site of Martlesham, formerly part of Britannia.
- Simplicia, the wife of Felix Acutus, and mother of Simplicia Acutilla, a girl buried at Mediolanum in Gallia Transpadana in the third or fourth century.
- Simplicia, buried at Rome, with a monument from her husband, Cominius Clemens, with whom she had lived for eight years, seven months, and six days.
- Simplicia, buried at Rome in a third-century tomb dedicated by her parents.
- Simplicia, buried at Rome in a fourth-century tomb dedicated by her parents, Pancratius and Daphne.
- Simplicia, buried at Rome on the day before the Nones of June (June 4), in a tomb dating to the first half of the fourth century.
- Simplicia, buried at Rome, aged twenty-four years, eleven months, and fifteen days, in a tomb dating to the first half of the fourth century.
- Simplicia, dedicated a tomb at Rome to her daughter, Simplicia, in AD 336.
- Simplicia, buried at Rome on the day before the Nones of February (February 4), AD 336, aged thirteen, in a tomb dedicated by her mother, Simplicia.
- Simplicia, a little girl buried at Rome on the Ides of November (November 13), aged three years, eleven months, and seven days, in a tomb dating to the middle of the fourth century.
- Simplicia, dedicated a tomb at Rome, dating to the middle of the fourth century, to her foster-son, Vernaclus, aged five years, eight months, and twenty-three days.
- Simplicia, buried at Rome on the seventh day before the Ides of August (August 7), aged twenty-six, in a tomb dating to the last quarter of the fourth century.
- Simplicia, buried at Sirmium in Pannonia Inferior, during the latter half of the second century, or the first half of the third.
- Simplicius, buried in a family sepulchre at Aquileia, along with his wife of eighteen years, Leontia, aged thirty-two, and their children, the senator Valentinianus and Vetranissa.
- Simplicius, buried at Aquileia, together with Venentianus, perhaps his brother.
- Simplicius, dedicated a tomb at Arelate, dating to the late third or early fourth century, for his wife, Vibia Eromene, with whom he had lived for three years.
- Simplicius, along with his sister-in-law, Covia Sabina, dedicated a tomb at Bononia in Cisalpine Gaul to his wife, Covia Secundina, aged twenty-three years, six months.
- Simplicius, buried at Carthage.
- Simplicius, a subdiaconus, or subdeacon, buried at Comelimagus in Liguria, on the eleventh day before the Kalends of July (June 21), aged twenty-five years, ten months, and eleven days.
- Simplicius, Praefectus Urbi of Constantinople in AD 403.
- Simplicius, along with his wife, Pompeia, dedicated a tomb at Emerita in Lusitania to their son, Pompeianus, aged twenty years, three months, and twenty-three days.
- Simplicius, built a tomb at Gemellae in Africa Proconsularis for himself and his wife, who was fifty-six years old.
- Simplicius, buried at Hadrumetum in Africa Proconsularis.
- Simplicius, a presbyter buried at Myrtilis Iulia in Lusitania, on the eighth day before the Kalends of September (August 25), in the five hundred and seventy-fifth year of the colony, aged fifty-nine.
- Simplicius, a little boy buried at Rome during the third century, aged six years and seven hours.
- Simplicius, along with his mother-in-law, Sperata, dedicated a third-century tomb at Rome for his wife, Speratilla, aged twenty-four years, four months, and eleven days.
- Simplicius, buried at Rome during the third century, in a tomb dedicated by his wife, Grata.
- Simplicius, buried at Rome during the latter half of the fourth century, aged thirty-three years and forty-three days, in a tomb dedicated by his brothers.
- Simplicius, a presbyter buried at Rome on the twelfth day before the Kalends of December (November 20), in the latter half of the fourth century.
- Simplicius, a senator buried at Rome in AD 375, along with several other members of senatorial families.
- Simplicius, buried at Rome during the fourth or fifth century, aged forty-one years, seven months, and twenty-nine days, on the day before the Ides of September (August 31).
- Simplicius, a Christian martyr buried at Rome in the latter half of the fourth century.
- Simplicius, an eques mentioned in an inscription dedicated to the gods of the dead at Singidunum in Moesia Superior, dating from AD 287.
- Simplicius, buried at Vienna in Gallia Narbonensis, on the fifth day before the Kalends of November (October 28), AD 511, aged about ninety.
- Gaius Simplicius, dedicated a tomb at Sitifis in Mauretania Caesariensis to his concubine, Arria Dativa, aged twenty-three.
- Publius Simplicius, made an offering to Saturn at Calama in Africa Proconsularis.
- Sextus Simplicius, a senator of aedilician rank at Thamugadi in Numidia.
- Simplicia Acutilla, the daughter of Felix Acutus and Simplicia, was buried at Mediolanum in the third or fourth century, aged seven years and six months.
- Simplicia Fastidita, dedicated a tomb at Ostia in Latium to her husband, Marcus Attennius.
- Simplicius Gregorius, a senator at Thamugadi, belonging to the ranks of the former prefects.
- Simplicius Justius Justinus, along with his children, Victoria Sosistraten and Justius Sanctinus, dedicated a tomb at Haedui to his wife, Victoria Latina, dating to the late second or early third century.
- Marcus Simplicius Quietus, tribune of the third cohort of Batavian soldiers, stationed at Vetus Salina in Pannonia Inferior, between AD 211 and 222.
- Simplicius Rufus, buried at Rome toward the end of the third century, or in the first quarter of the fourth.
- Simplicia Rustica, buried in a fourth-century tomb at Rome, on the tenth day before the Kalends of February (January 23), aged eighteen years, five months, and fifteen days, having lived with her husband, Flavius Julius Julianus, for three years and two days.
- Marcus Simplicius Simplex, prefect of an unknown military unit, made an offering to Sol Invictus and Mithras at Brocolitia in Britannia during the first half of the third century.
- Simplicius Successus, buried at Thizica in Africa Proconsularis, aged thirty-eight years, three months, and fifteen days.
- Simplicia Ursa, buried at Rome, aged thirty-three years, eleven months, and twenty-two days, in a fourth-century tomb dedicated by Sergius Bessus, perhaps her husband.
- Simplicius Victor, buried at Carthage.

== See also ==
- List of Roman gentes

== Bibliography ==
- Theodor Mommsen et alii, Corpus Inscriptionum Latinarum (The Body of Latin Inscriptions, abbreviated CIL), Berlin-Brandenburgische Akademie der Wissenschaften (1853–present).
- Giovanni Battista de Rossi, Inscriptiones Christianae Urbis Romanae Septimo Saeculo Antiquiores (Christian Inscriptions from Rome of the First Seven Centuries, abbreviated ICUR), Vatican Library, Rome (1857–1861, 1888).
- René Cagnat et alii, L'Année épigraphique (The Year in Epigraphy, abbreviated AE), Presses Universitaires de France (1888–present).
- George Davis Chase, "The Origin of Roman Praenomina", in Harvard Studies in Classical Philology, vol. VIII, pp. 103–184 (1897).
- Stéphane Gsell, Inscriptions Latines de L'Algérie (Latin Inscriptions from Algeria, abbreviated ILAlg), Edouard Champion, Paris (1922–present).
- Ernst Diehl, Inscriptiones Latinae Christianae Veteres (Ancient Latin Christian Inscriptions, abbreviated ILCV), Weidmann, Berlin (1925–1931).
- Alfred Merlin, Inscriptions Latines de La Tunisie (Latin Inscriptions from Tunisia, abbreviated ILTun), Fondation Dourlans, Paris (1944).
- Luis García Iglesias, Epigrafía Romana de Augusta Emerita (Roman Epigraphy of Augusta Emerita, abbreviated ERAEmerita), Madrid (1973).
- The Roman Inscriptions of Britain (abbreviated RIB), Oxford, (1990–present).
