= Maria José Palla =

Portuguese photographer and academic (1943–2025)

- Self-portrait by Palla
- Born: 30 July 1943; Lisbon, Portugal
- Died: 27 July 2025 (aged 81); Lisbon
- Occupations: photographer; professor of literature

Maria José Palla (1943–2025) was a Portuguese photographer and a professor of literature, photography, and cinema, at the NOVA University Lisbon. To escape Portugal's dictatorship, she had spent most of her third and fourth decades studying and working in Paris.

== Early life and training ==
Palla was born on 30 July 1943 in the Portuguese capital of Lisbon. She was the daughter of the architect Victor Palla and the painter Zuilcides Saraiva. Living under the Estado Novo dictatorship in Portugal she chose to move to Paris. The exact year of her departure from Portugal is unclear but by 1963 she was taking a photography course at the Société française de photographie in Paris, as well as conducting research and doing an internship in laboratory techniques. In 1965 she attended the École nationale supérieure Louis-Lumière, while doing an internship at an advertising agency. From 1967 to 1973 she worked as an assistant at the Pierre and Marie Curie Laboratory, now the Institut Curie, while also taking courses at the École pratique des hautes études under the direction of the filmmaker Jean Rouch. Palla then studied art history as a senior student at the École du Louvre, from which she graduated in museology in 1975, at the same time studying for a degree in Portuguese from Paris 8 University where she gained a degree in literature in 1980.

In 1982 Palla obtained an advanced studies diploma from the Paris-Sorbonne University in Romance Studies, with a thesis entitled "Objects of Civilization in the Work of Gil Vicente". She received a PhD from the same university in 1991, with a thesis on the symbolism of costume in the works of Gil Vicente.

== Career in Portugal ==
From 1977 to 1983 Palla taught at the Sorbonne Nouvelle University and at the Académie de Versailles. In 1983 she decided to return to Lisbon, seven years after the overthrow of the Estado Novo by the Carnation Revolution, taking a position at the NOVA University as an auxiliary professor, later being promoted to associate professor in 1986 and associate professor with Habilitation in 2003. Based in the Department of Portuguese Studies and working as a researcher at the Institute of Medieval Studies, she taught the history of theatre, the literature of the renaissance, literature and photography, French literature and Portuguese literature. She retired from the university in 2011.

Palla became a specialist in the work of Gil Vicente (c. 1465 – c. 1536) and authored numerous books and articles on him, as well as on 16th-century theatre, and Portuguese Renaissance painting. Her books, monographs and articles included a Dictionary of Characters in Vicente's Theatre (2015); Grão Vasco and the Altarpiece of Viseu Cathedral (1999); a lexical study of costume and adornments in Gil Vicente (1997); The Word and the Image: Essays on Gil Vicente and sixteenth-century painting (1996); Food metaphors in 16th-Century theatre (2009); Making Sense of Their Senses: A New Look at the Still Lifes of Josefa de Óbidos and Polaroids (2021).

The Polaroids book brought together her self-portrait photographs taken between 1996 and 2003, which were exhibited at Appleton Square exhibition space in Lisbon in 2022. Following Palla's return to Lisbon from Paris her photographs were exhibited in different parts of Portugal, Europe and elsewhere, including the former Portuguese colony of Macau. The 1998 exhibition, Portraits of Poets, featured close-ups of authors of contemporary Portuguese literature, including Mário Cesariny de Vasconcelos, Nuno Júdice, and Sophia de Mello Breyner Andresen. Other exhibitions included Faces of Melancholy and The Woman Without a Shadow (2001), The Wheel of Time (2006), Le Temps (2010) and Fragments of a Discourse (2013). To celebrate her 80th birthday, a first retrospective exhibition of her work was held in 2024 at the Frei Manuel do Cenáculo National Museum in Évora, Portugal. She also worked with museums to ensure that the artistic work of her parents was not forgotten, donating eleven works by her father and two paintings by her mother to the Museum of Neo-Realism in Vila Franca de Xira, to the north of Lisbon, in 2011 and an additional painting by her mother in 2025. In 2022 she organised a centenary exhibition of her father's work in Madeira.

Palla also did translations. Among the works she translated were the Livro de Cozinha da Infanta D. Maria de Portugal, Portugal's oldest known cookbook, which she translated into French for Lisbon's Institute of Medieval Studies, as well as the screenplay for Hiroshima Mon Amour by Marguerite Duras (trans. with Manuel Villaverde Cabral), the book Vie de Michel-Ange (Life of Michelangelo) by Romain Rolland, and Albert Camus par lui-même (Camus by Himself) by Morvan Lebesque, all of which she translated into Portuguese.

== Death ==
Palla died on 27 July 2025 in Lisbon. She was buried in the Alto de São João Cemetery.
