= Diocese of Beja =

Roman Catholic diocese in Portugal

Coordinates: 38.0169°N 7.8647°W

Diocese of Beja Dioecesis Beiensis Diocese de Beja

Catholic
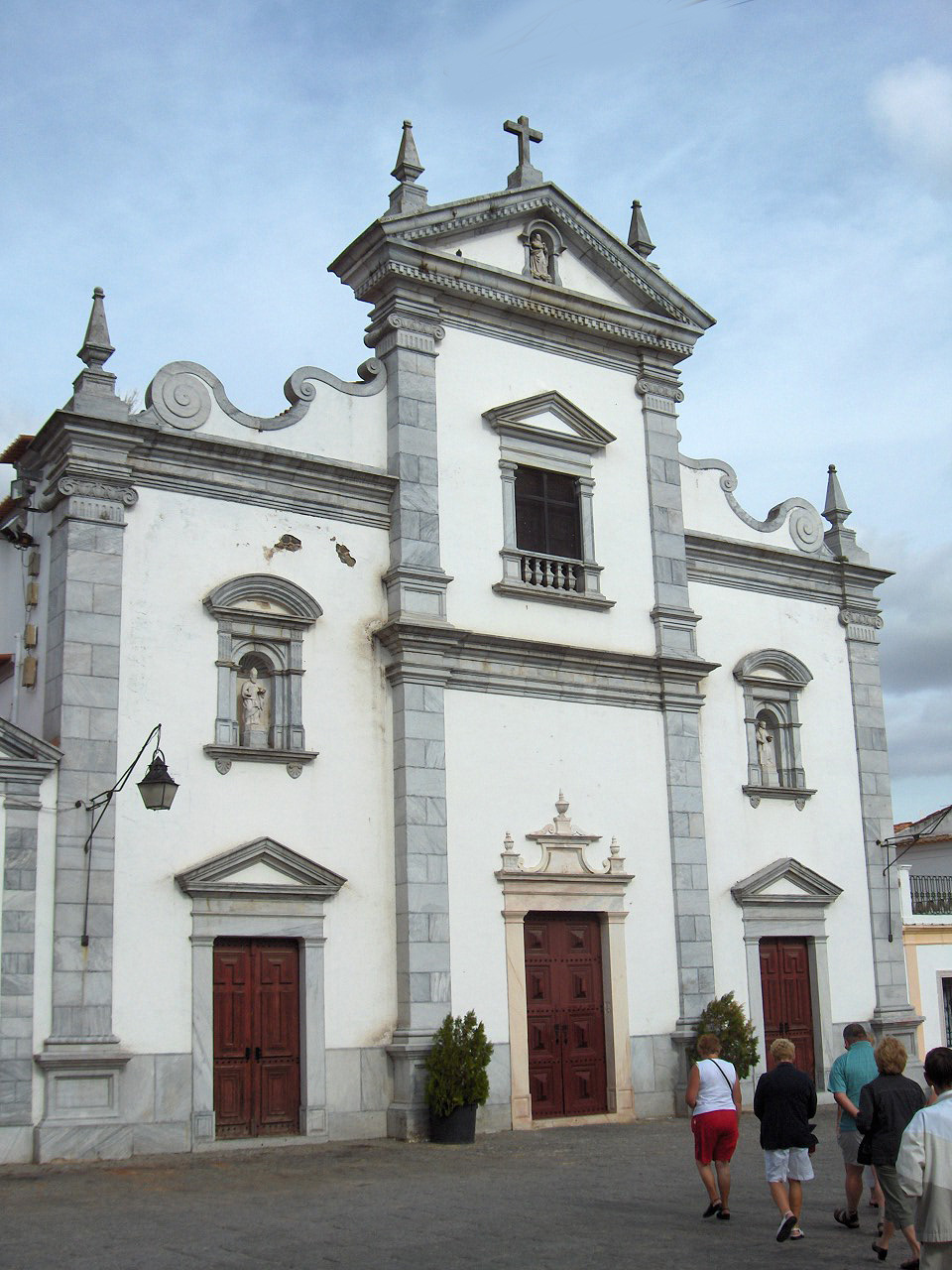
- The Cathedral of St. James the Greater in Beja

Location
- Country: Portugal
- Ecclesiastical province: Evora
- Metropolitan: Archdiocese of Évora
- Headquarters: Beja, Beja District, Portugal

Statistics
- Area: 12,300 km^{2} (4,700 sq mi)
- Population: Total; Catholics: (as of 2023); 211,540; 173,125 (81.8%)
- Parishes: 121

Information
- Denomination: Catholic Church
- Sui iuris church: Latin Church
- Rite: Roman Rite
- Established: 10 July 1770; 256 years ago
- Cathedral: Cathedral of St. James the Greater in Beja
- Patron saint: Saint Joseph
- Secular priests: 51 (43 Diocesan, 8 Religious Orders)

Current leadership
- Pope: Leo XIV
- Bishop: Fernando Maio de Paiva
- Metropolitan Archbishop: Francisco Senra Coelho
- Bishops emeritus: José João dos Santos Marcos

Map
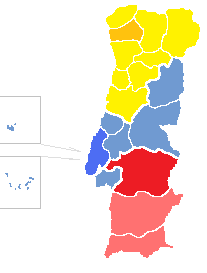

Website
- Website of the Diocese

The Diocese of Beja (Latin: Dioecesis Beiensis) is a Latin Church diocese of the Catholic church in Portugal. It is a suffragan of the archdiocese of Évora.

== History ==
Beja lies on the site of Pax Julia, or Paca, of the Romans, and is still surrounded by remains of old Roman walls, partly restored. The diocese was created 10 June 1770. Beja was taken from its Islamic rulers in 1162 by Afonso I of Portugal. Beja Cathedral is an old church, much modernized, of uncertain date.

The chronicler Isidorus Pacensis, of the eighth century, was traditionally said to have been bishop of Beja; but this is now disputed.

== Leadership ==
=== Bishops of Beja ===
(All Roman Rite)

- Manuel do Cenáculo, T.O.R. (6 Aug 1770 – 9 Aug 1802), appointed Archbishop of Évora
- Francisco Leitão de Carvalho, O. Cist. (9 Aug 1802 – 21 Sep 1806)
- Fr. Joaquim do Rosário, O.F.M. Ref. (3 Aug 1807 – 8 Sep 1808)
- Fr. Manuel de Sousa Carvalho, M.I. (19 Dec 1814 – 1815)
- Luís da Cunha de Abreu e Melo (28 Aug 1820 – 9 Aug 1833)
- Manuel Pires de Azevedo Loureiro (22 Jan 1844 – 26 Sep 1848)
- José Xavier de Cerveira e Sousa (28 Sep 1849 – 15 Apr 1859), appointed Bishop of Viseu
- José António da Mata e Silva (20 Jun 1859 – 13 Jul 1860), appointed Archbishop of Évora
- António da Trindade de Vasconcelos Pereira de Melo (18 Mar 1861 – 1 Oct 1863), appointed Bishop of Lamego
- António Xavier de Sousa Monteiro (9 Aug 1883 – 1 Jun 1906)
- Sebastião Leite de Vasconcelos (19 Dec 1907 – 15 Dec 1919), resigned
- José do Patrocínio Dias (16 Dec 1920 – 24 Oct 1965)
- Manuel dos Santos Rocha (14 Dec 1965 – 8 Sep 1980), retired
- Manuel Franco da Costa de Oliveira Falcão (8 Sep 1980 – 25 Jan 1999), retired
- António Vitalino Fernandes Dantas, O. Carm. (25 Jan 1999 – 3 Nov 2016), retired
- José João dos Santos Marcos (3 Nov 2016 – 21 Mar 2024), resigned
- Fernando Maio de Paiva (21 Mar 2024 – Present)

== See also ==
- Catholic Church in Portugal
