= António Vitalino Dantas =

Portuguese Roman Catholic bishop (1941–2026)

The Most Reverend António Vitalino Dantas O. Carm.
- Bishop of Beja
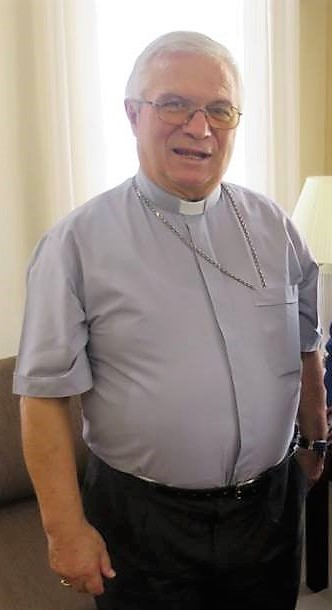
- Dantas in 2016
- Church: Catholic Church
- Archdiocese: Évora
- Diocese: Beja
- Appointed: 25 January 1999
- Installed: 11 April 1999
- Term ended: 3 November 2016
- Predecessor: Manuel Falcão
- Successor: José João dos Santos Marcos
- Other posts: Auxiliary Bishop of Auxiliary Bishop of Lisbon and Titular Bishop of Tlos (1996–1999)

Orders
- Ordination: 3 August 1968
- Consecration: 29 September 1996 by António Ribeiro, Eurico Dias Nogueira and João Alves

Personal details
- Born: António Vitalino Fernandes Dantas; 3 November 1941 Oleiros, Vila Verde, Portugal
- Died: 9 October 2026 (aged 84) Braga, Portugal
- Education: Carmelite Seminary at Falperra
- Motto: Pro causa Domini me consecro

António Vitalino Fernandes Dantas O. Carm. (3 November 1941 – 9 October 2026) was a Portuguese Roman Catholic prelate and member of the Carmelite Order. He served as Bishop of Beja from 1999 until his resignation in 2016, having previously served as an auxiliary bishop of the Patriarchate of Lisbon from 1996 to 1999.

== Early life and priesthood ==
Dantas was born on 3 November 1941 in Oleiros, in the municipality of Vila Verde, in the Braga region of Portugal. After initial experiences with the Franciscans and Capuchins, he entered the Carmelite seminary at Falperra, near Braga, and became a member of the Carmelite Order.

He was ordained a priest on 3 August 1968. He subsequently pursued theological studies in Germany, where he also worked among Portuguese emigrant communities. In 1976, he returned to Portugal and began pastoral work at the parish of Santo António dos Cavaleiros in Loures.

== Episcopal ministry ==
=== Auxiliary Bishop of Lisbon ===
On 3 July 1996, Pope John Paul II appointed Dantas titular bishop of Tlos and auxiliary bishop of the Patriarchate of Lisbon.

Dantas received episcopal consecration on 29 September 1996 at the Jerónimos Monastery in Lisbon. The principal consecrator was Cardinal António Ribeiro, then Patriarch of Lisbon.

=== Bishop of Beja ===
On 25 January 1999, John Paul II appointed Dantas as Bishop of Beja in southern Portugal. The appointment was recorded in Acta Apostolicae Sedis in 1999. He took canonical possession of the diocese on 11 April 1999.

During his episcopate, Dantas served the diocese for more than 17 years. In October 2014, at his request, Pope Francis appointed José João dos Santos Marcos as coadjutor bishop of Beja to facilitate the eventual succession as Dantas approached the customary retirement age for diocesan bishops.

On 3 November 2016, Pope Francis accepted Dantas's resignation from the pastoral governance of the Diocese of Beja. He was succeeded by the coadjutor bishop, José João dos Santos Marcos, and thereafter held the title of bishop emeritus of Beja.

== Death ==
Dantas died at the Hospital de Braga in Braga, Portugal, on 9 October 2026, at the age of 84. His death was announced by the bishop of Beja, Fernando Maio de Paiva. His funeral Mass was scheduled for 10 October, at the parish church in Parada de Gatim in the municipality of Vila Verde, followed by burial in the local cemetery.

Catholic Church titles
Preceded by Manuel Falcão	Bishop of Beja; 1999–2016	Succeeded by José João dos Santos Marcos
Preceded by Carl Anthony Fisher	Titular Bishop of Tlos; 1996–1999	Succeeded by Francisco Ramírez Navarro
Preceded by —	Auxiliary Bishop of Lisbon; 1996–1999	Succeeded by —
