= Manuel Falcão =

Manuel Franco da Costa de Oliveira Falcão
- Bishop of the Diocese of Beja (emeritus)
- Church: Roman Catholic Church
- See: Diocese of Beja
- In office: 1980 - 1999
- Predecessor: Manuel Dos Santos Rocha
- Successor: António Vitalino Fernandes Dantas
- Previous post: Prelate

Orders
- Ordination: 29 June 1951
- Consecration: 22 January 1967 by Manuel Gonçalves Cerejeira

Personal details
- Born: 10 November 1922 Lisbon, Portugal
- Died: 21 February 2012 (aged 89) Beja, Portugal

Manuel Franco da Costa de Oliveira Falcão (10 November 1922 – 21 February 2012) was a Portuguese Prelate of the Roman Catholic Church.

Manuel Franco da Costa de Oliveira Falcão was born in Lisbon, and was ordained a priest on 29 June 1951. Falcão was appointed auxiliary archbishop to the Archdiocese of Lisbon on 6 December 1966, as well as titular bishop of Thelepte, and ordained bishop on 22 January 1967. Falcão was appointed bishop of the Diocese of Beja on 8 September 1980 and would remain in the post until his retirement on 25 January 1999.

== See also ==
- Diocese of Beja
- Archdiocese of Lisbon
