= Igreja do Espírito Santo (Évora) =

Church in Évora, Portugal

Coordinates: 38.5728°N 7.9044°W

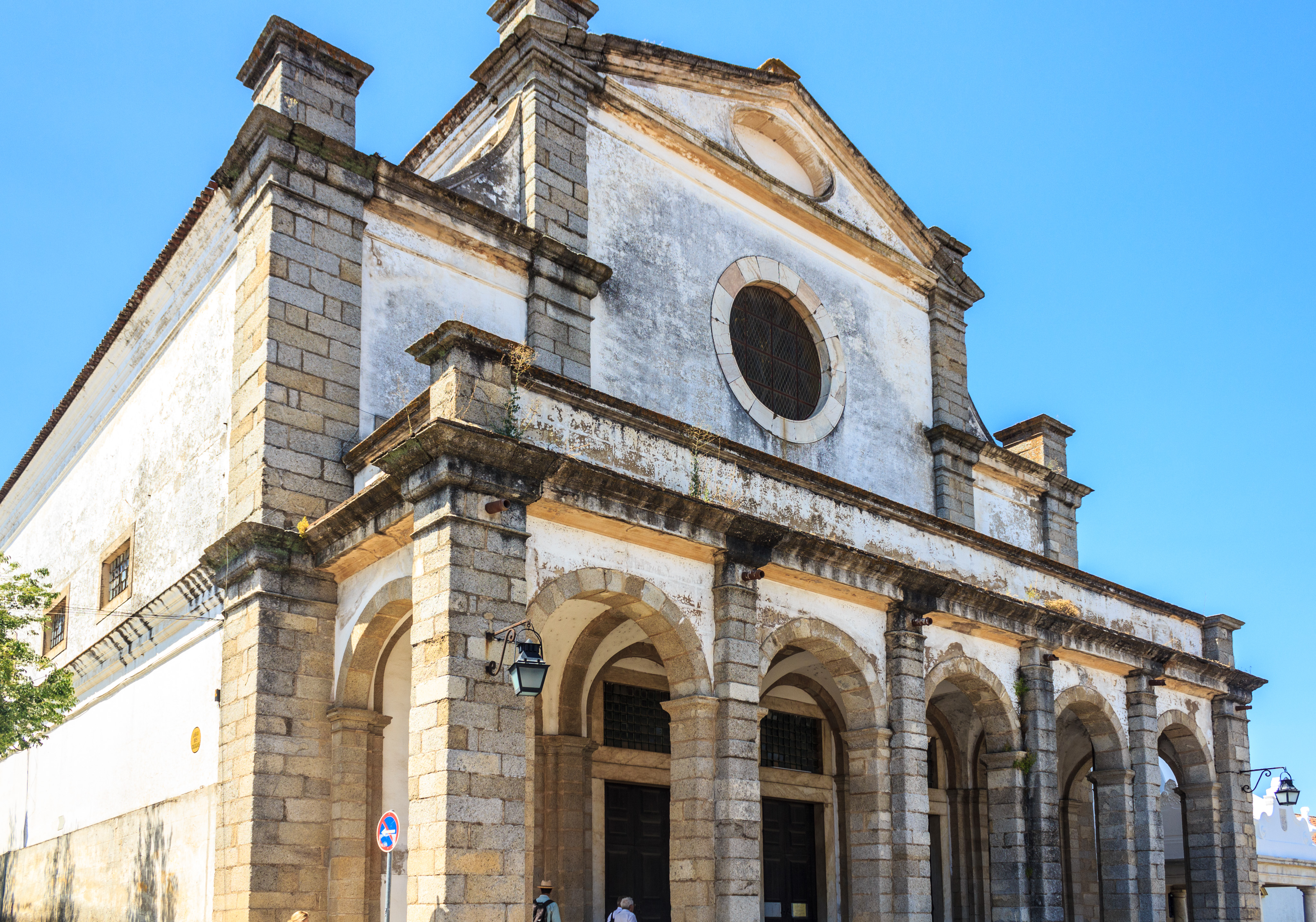
Igreja do Espírito Santo

Igreja do Espírito Santo is a church in Portugal situated in Largo dos Colegiais in the city of Évora. It is classified as a National Monument since 2010.

== See also ==
- List of Jesuit sites
