= Myrtilis Iulia =

Roman Municipium in times of Augustus, present day Mértola, Portugal

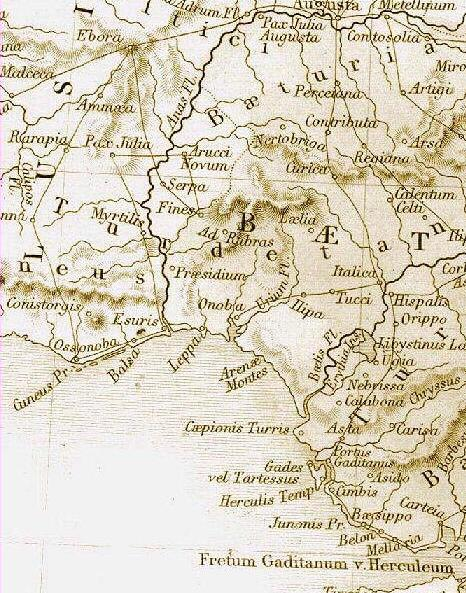
- Map of the Gulf of Cádiz in Roman times, with Myrtilis visible to the left of center, on the Anas river.
- Interactive map of Myrtilis Iulia
- 37°38′25″N 7°39′40″W
- Type: Settlement
- Cultures: Roman
- Location: present day Mértola, Portugal

Myrtilis Iulia was the Roman name given to present day Mértola, Portugal. During Classical Antiquity, Mértola was inhabited by Phoenicians, Carthaginians and finally the Romans, who called it Myrtilis Iulia.

The region was inhabited at least since the Iron Age at least by the Conni and Cynetes and was influenced by the Phoenicians.

The strategic location of Mértola, on a hill by the northernmost navigable part of the Guadiana river, was crucial in its early development. Agricultural products grown in the villae nearby and valuable minerals (silver, gold and tin) obtained from the lower Alentejo region were sent from the fluvial port of Mértola via the Guadiana to Southern Hispania and the Mediterranean.

An account cited that the young Julius Caesar established a stronghold at Myrtilis during Pompey's governorship of Hispania. The settlement became an important bridgehead and jumping-off point for the Roman campaigns during the conquest of the Iberian Peninsula.

Between 1st and 2nd century, Myrtilis was part of the larger Pacensis region (under the capital Beja/Pax Iulia) and acquired a great importance, as a dynamic commercial centre, permitting it to mint its own coin. The town was raised to the status of a Municipium in times of Emperor Augustus and was connected to important Roman cities (Beja, Évora) through a road system.

During the Migration Period, Mértola was invaded by Germanic tribes of the Suebi and the Visigoths. In this period (5th-8th centuries) commerce was reduced but still active, as evidenced by Greek tombstones from the 6th-7th centuries found in Mértola, which suggests the presence of Byzantine merchants in the town. During the Umayyad hegemony in spain, Mertola became a capital city ruled by a regional governor.

== See also ==
- Pax Iulia
- Lusitania
