= Frei Manuel do Cenáculo National Museum =

Museum in Portugal

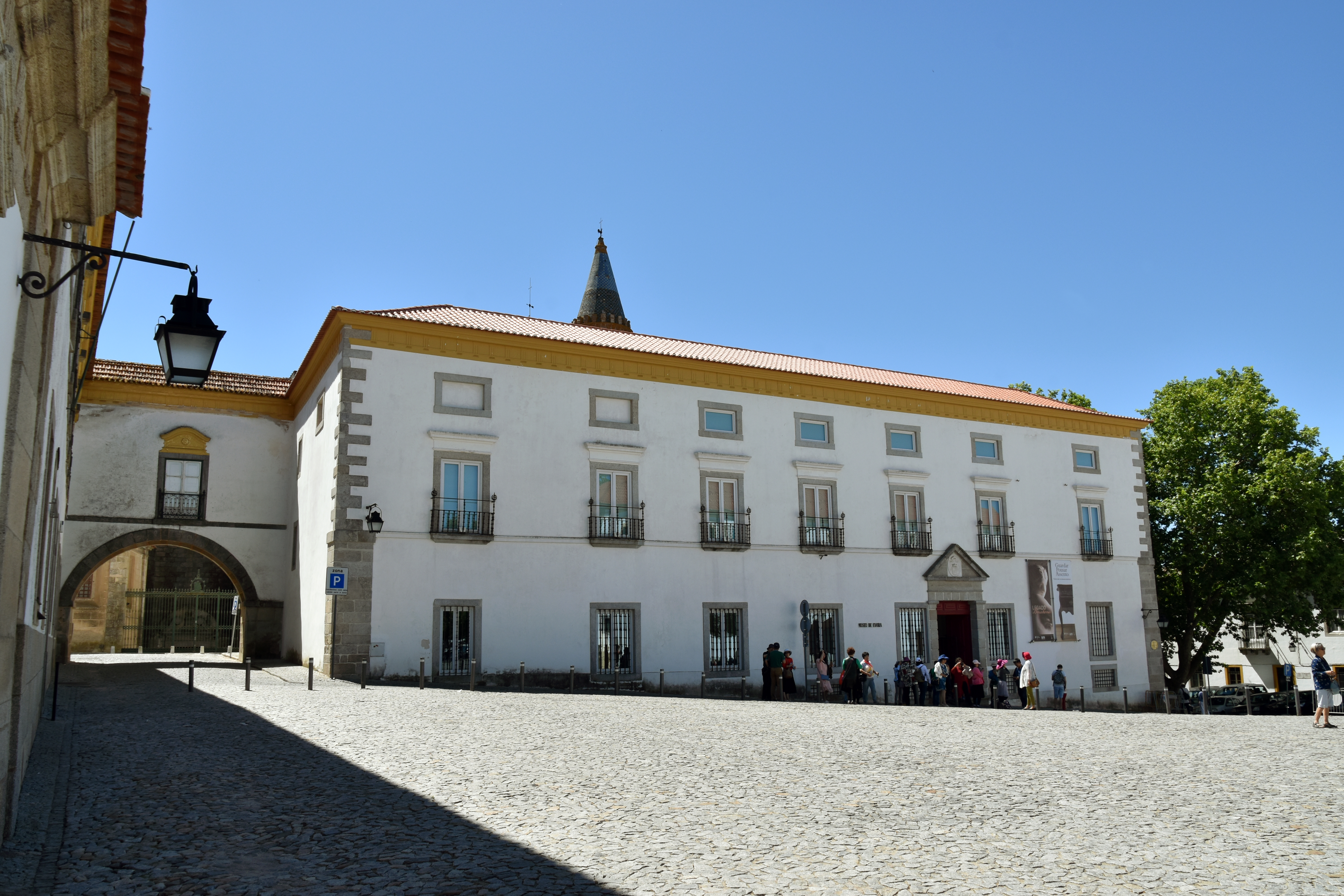
- Established: 1915
- Location: Largo do Conde de Vila Flor, Évora, Portugal
- Coordinates: 38°34′20″N 7°54′26″W

The Frei Manuel do Cenáculo National Museum (Museu Nacional Frei Manuel do Cenáculo), formerly known as the Évora Museum, is in the historic centre of the city of Évora in Portugal. It has a diverse collection, with more than 20,000 pieces covering painting; archaeology; sculpture; decorative arts; and numismatics. Since 2023 it has been managed by Museus e Monumentos de Portugal, formerly the General Directorate of Cultural Heritage.

== History ==
Creation of the Évora Museum was authorized on 30 July 1914, and it was officially established the following year under the name of Évora Regional Museum. It opened to the public in 1921, in the Palácio Amaral, moving to its current building on Largo do Conde de Vila Flor in 1929. The first four rooms were inaugurated two years later and, in 1936, the archaeological section was incorporated. This had previously been located on the ground floor of the Évora public library. With the appointment of Mário Tavares Chicó as director in 1943, a phase of restructuring of the interior of the building began. It was not until 1970 that the prehistory section, located in the basement, was inaugurated. In 2004, the museum closed for renovations of the entire building, works that were only completed in 2009, when it reopened to the public. During the period of closure, restoration work was carried out on some of the most important works in the collection. In 2020 the museum suffered problems due to a lack of staff.

The diversity of the museum's collection, which dates back to Frei Manuel do Cenáculo who was Archbishop of Évora between 1802 and 1814, makes the museum an important institution for the understanding of Portuguese national history and the country's artistic and cultural achievements.

== Collections ==
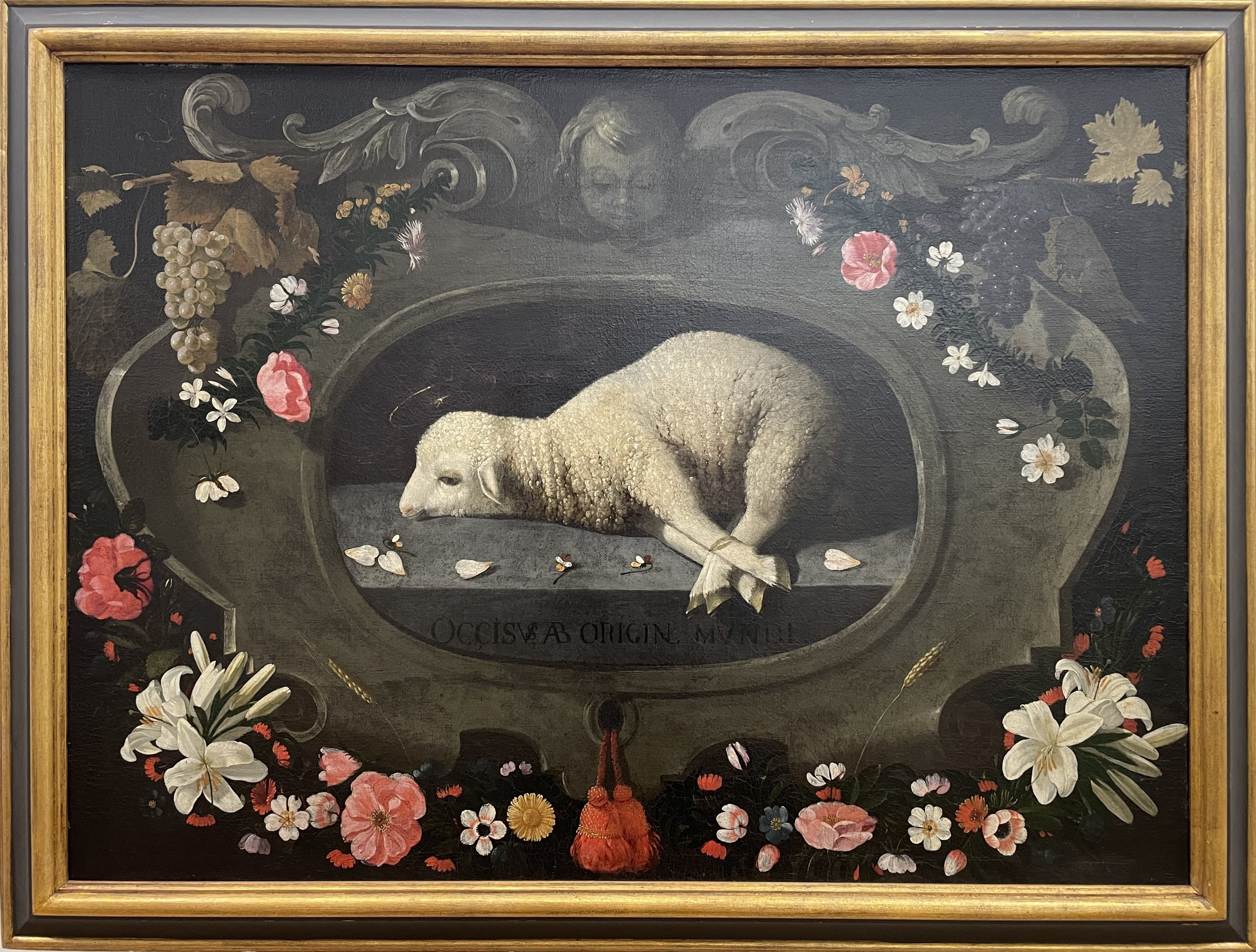
Oil painting by Josefa de Óbidos

The collection of paintings covers the period from the 15th century to the 20th century. Emphasis is on Portuguese artists or on foreign artists who worked in Portugal. Among those represented are Baltazar Gomes Figueira, his daughter Josefa de Óbidos, Morgado de Setúbal, Domingos Sequeira, Cirilo Volkmar Machado, Silva Porto, the Andalusian painter Josefa Garcia Greno, and Dórdio Gomes.

Also noteworthy are various works from different extinct churches and convents in Évora. These include a 13-panel polyptych (composed of thirteen oil paintings on wood) from the former high altar of the Cathedral of Évora, and the Valverde Convent triptych, painted by the Renaissance royal painter Gregório Lopes. Also noteworthy is the work by (or attributed to) the Flemish Renaissance painter Francisco Henriques. In the collection of foreign paintings, works by the Italian Marcello Leopardi and the Dutch painter Abraham de Vries are particularly notable. The sculptures in the collection include works by Nicolas Chantereine and António Teixeira Lopes.

The archaeology section contains findings from excavations in the Évora area, which has many megalithic sites. These include the Great Dolmen of Zambujeiro, findings from which are on display.
