= Pax Julia =

Coordinates: 38.0178°N 7.8653°W

Pax Iulia
- Colonia Civitas Pacensis, Pax Augusta
- Interactive map of Pax Iulia
- Type: Settlement
- Cultures: Roman
- Location: Beja
- Region: Alentejo

Pax Iulia (also known as Colonia Civitas Pacensis) or later Pax Augusta was a city in the Roman province of Lusitania (today situated in the Portuguese municipality of Beja).

== History ==
Administrative organization of Hispania in 17 BC by emperor Augustus

The region was inhabited during 400 BC by Celtic tribes, but there are indications that Carthaginian settlers occupied the territory, from the writings of 2nd century scholars Polybius and Claudius Ptolemy..

In 48 BC, it was renamed Pax Iulia (referring to the "peace of the gens Julia") by Julius Caesar following the peace between Rome and the Lusitani. The settlement became the centre of the conventus iuridicus Pacensis, (in the Roman province of Lusitania), since it was located on a strategic roadway junction with connection Myrtilis Iulia (a harbor city along the Guadiana river).

Sometime between 31 and 27 BC, during the reign of the emperor Augustus, the city was granted the status of municipium following the Battle of Actium, and the colonists ascribed to the gens Galeria. It was at this time that a new designation began to appear: Pax Augusta (referring to the peace of Augustus) as mentioned by Strabo.

=== 20th century ===
Archaeological excavations during the 20th century uncovered the remains of a large Roman temple, 30 by 19.4 metres (98 ft × 64 ft), dating to the first century AD located within the settlement's forum, with several inscriptions, Roman arches, fortifications and an aqueduct. Possible locations for the theater and amphitheater were deduced from the urban layout.

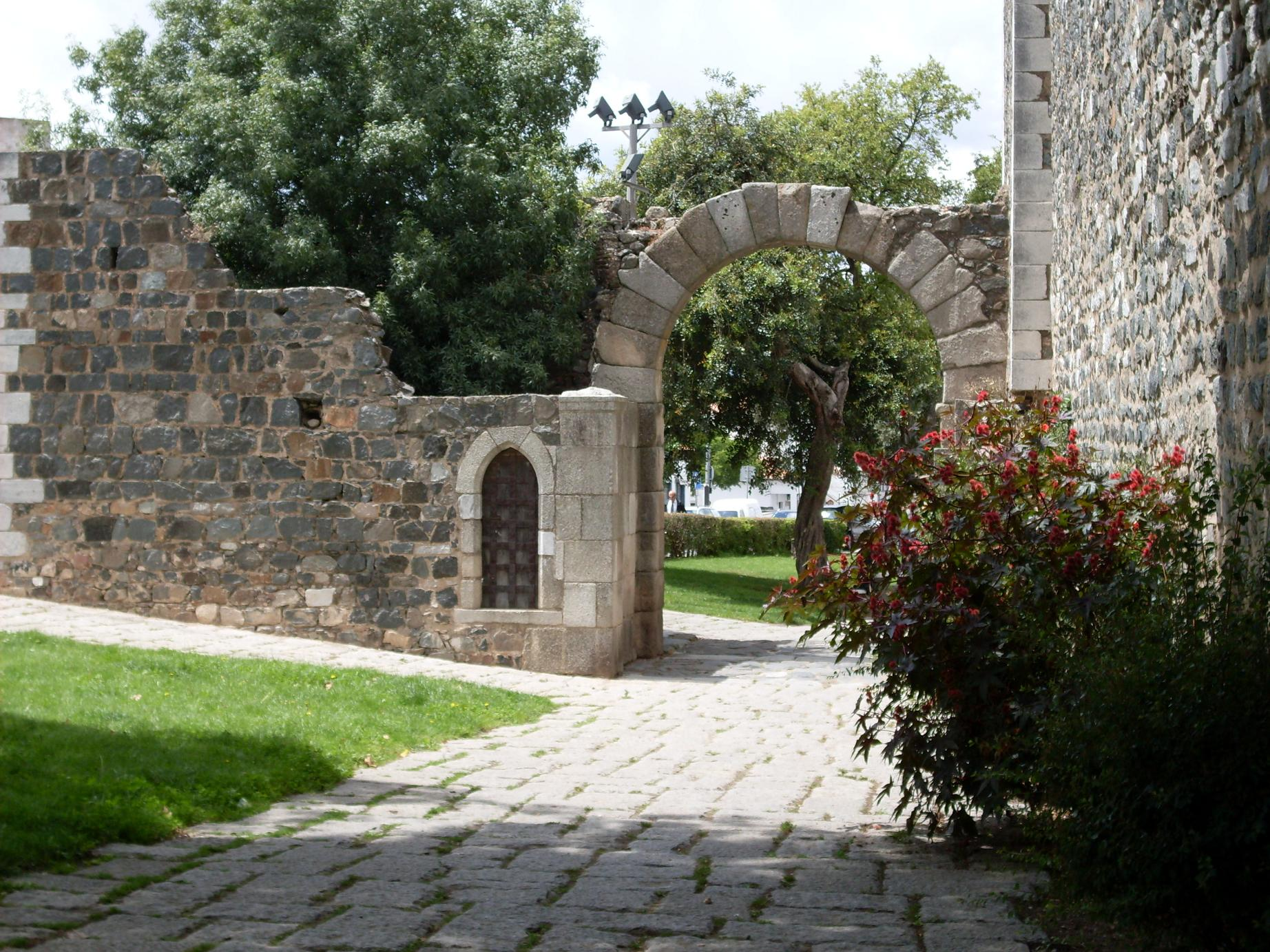
Roman arch from Beja

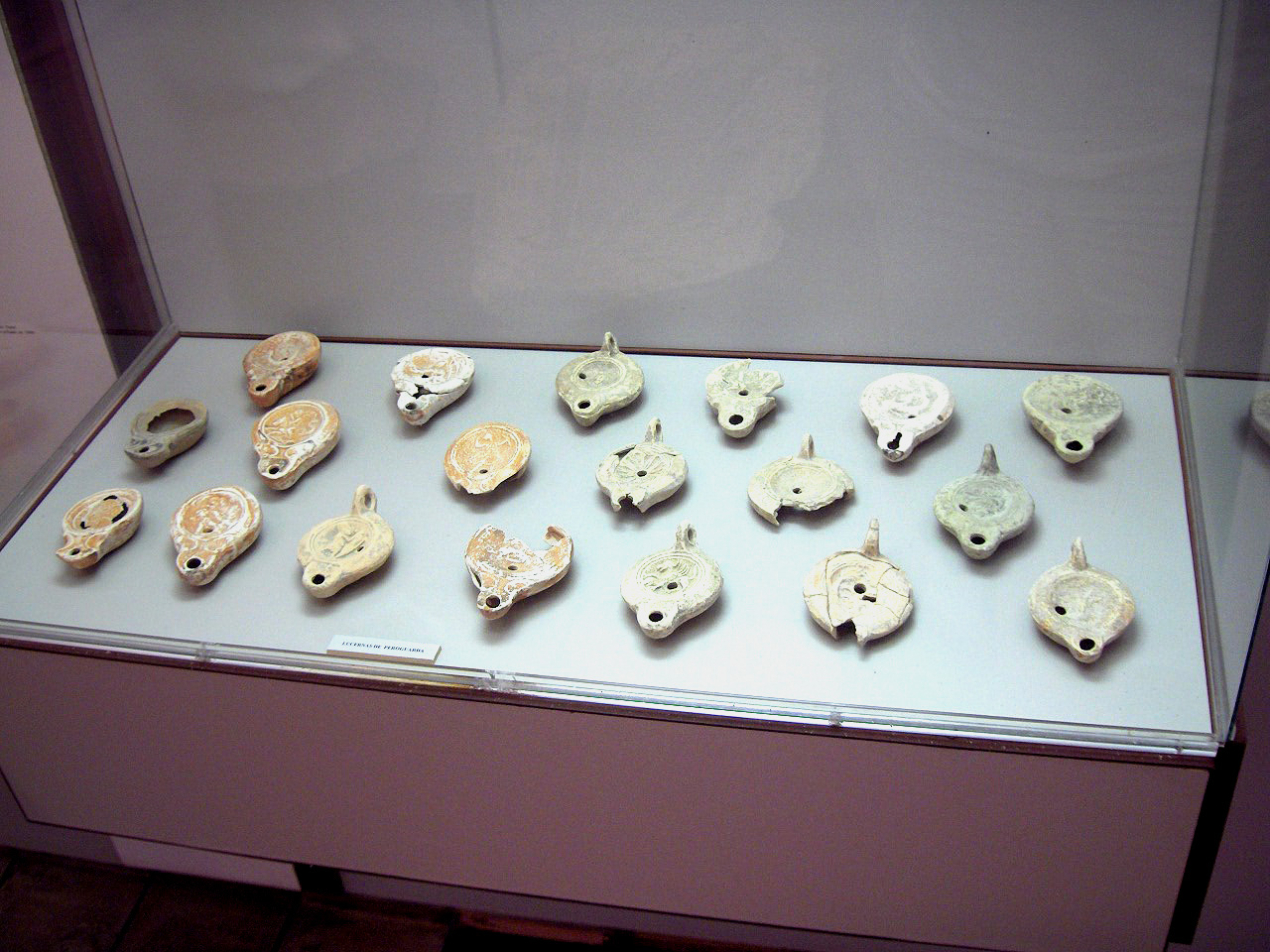
Roman oil lamps; Rainha D. Leonor Museum

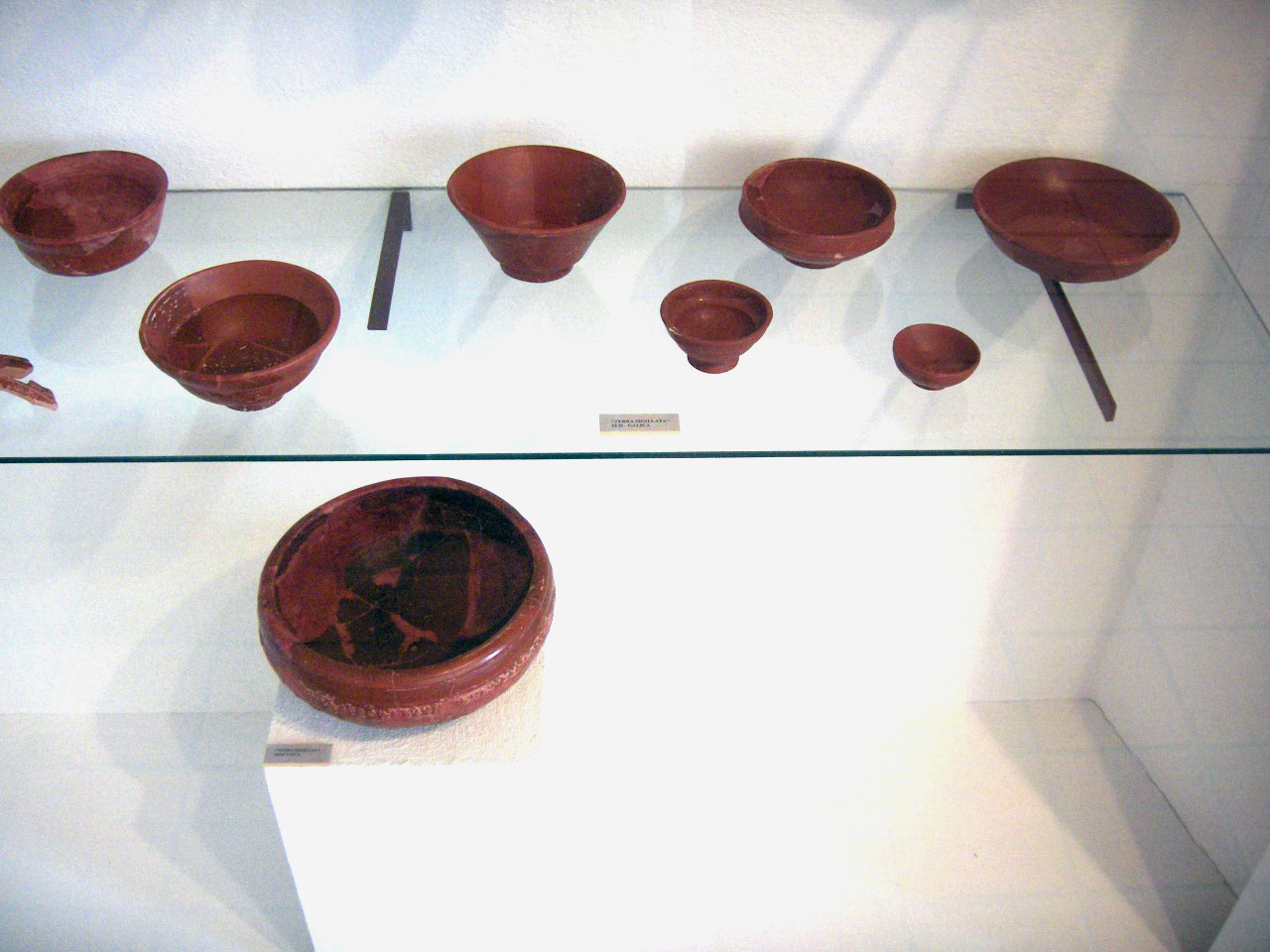
Terra sigillata (ceramic ware made of porous clay fired at low heat); Rainha D. Leonor Museum

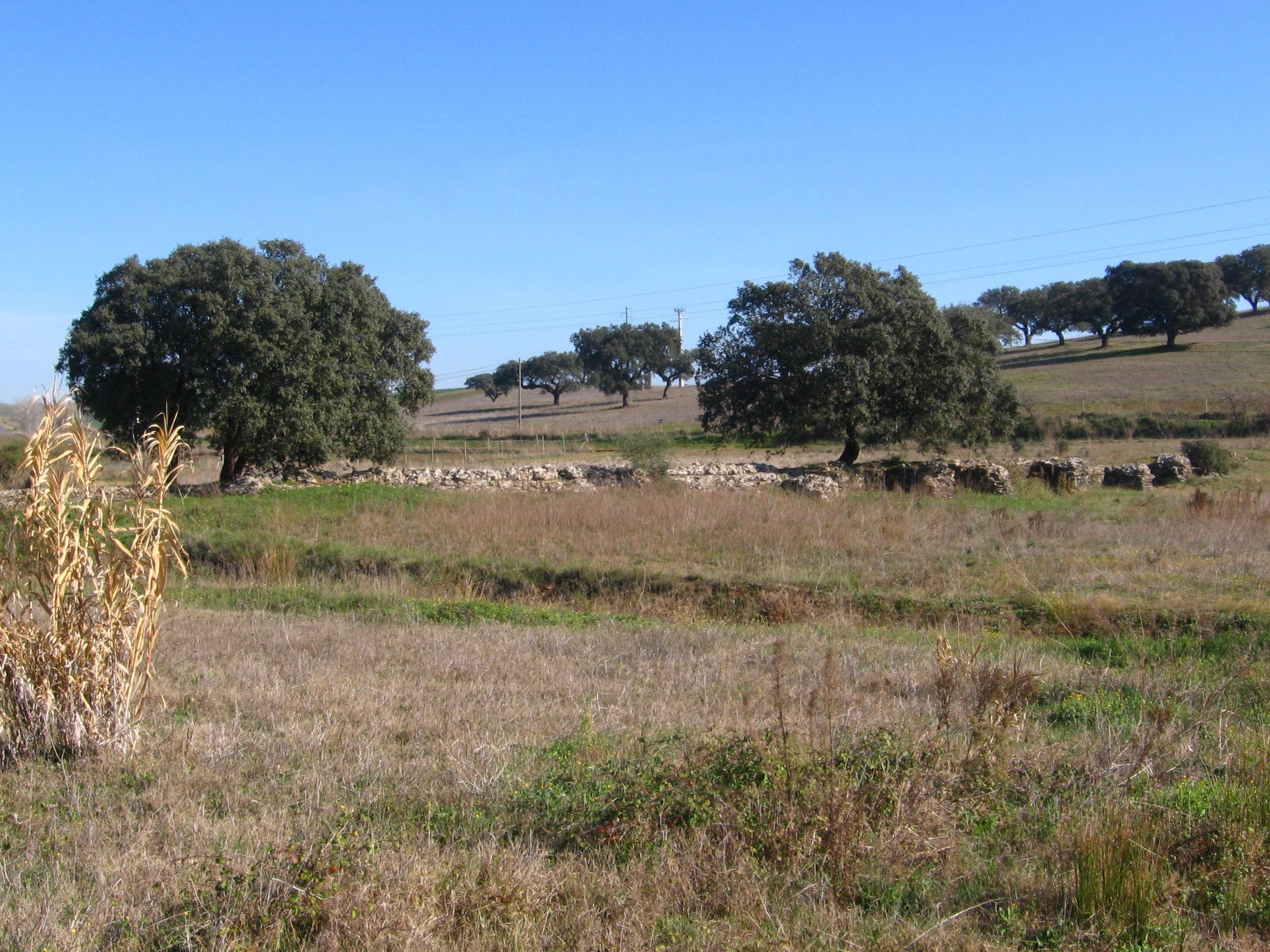
Roman dam, Cuba Municipality, Beja

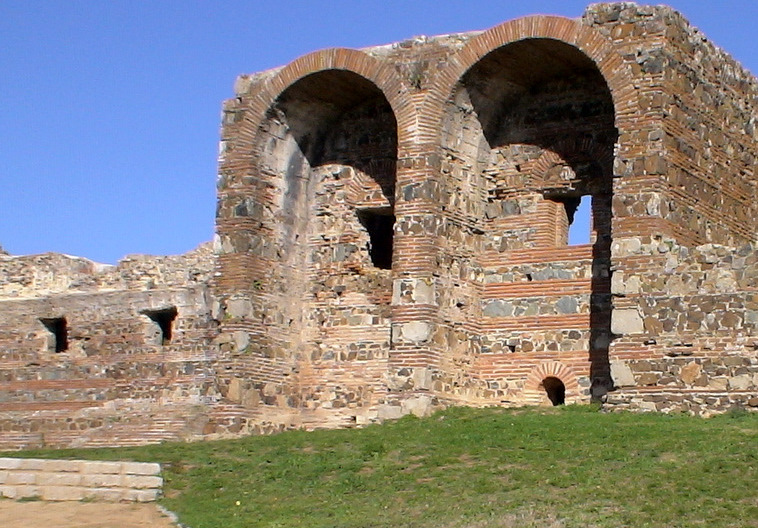
Roman Ruins of São Cucufate, municipality of Vidigueira
