= Abu'l-Khattar al-Husam ibn Dirar al-Kalbi =

Mid-8th century Umayyad governor of al-Andalus

Abu'l-Khattar al-Husam ibn Darar al-Kalbi (Arabic: أبو الخطار الحسام بن ضرار الكلبي) was Umayyad governor of Al-Andalus from May 743 until August 745. He was succeeded by Tuwaba ibn Salama al-Gudami. Whilst governor he was ordered by the caliph Hisham ibn Abd al-Malik to restore lands to Sara al-Qutiyya that had been appropriated by her uncle.

He was taken prisoner by the Ma'addites at the Battle of Secunda in 747 whilst trying to re-assert his right to rule against the challenge of Yusuf ibn 'Abd al-Rahman al-Fihri.

== See also ==
- Timeline of the Muslim presence in the Iberian peninsula

Preceded by Thalaba ibn Salama al-Amili	Governor of Al-Andalus; 743–745	Succeeded by Tuwaba ibn Salama al-Gudami
