= Al-Lakhmi =

al-Lakhmi may refer to several people:

- Ayyub ibn Habib al-Lakhmi (c. 716) Umayyad Wali of al-Andalus for Sulayman ibn Abd al-Malik
- Abd al-Rahman ibn Kathir al-Lakhmi (c. 747) Umayyad Wali of al-Andalus for Marwan Ibn Muhammad, last Umayyad caliph
- Abu al-Hassan al-Lakhmi (1006–1085), jurist from Qayrawan, Ifriqiya
- Ibn Hisham al-Lakhmi (12th century), preeminent Almohad Arabic-language grammarian from Seville
