= Thuwaba ibn Salama al-Judhami =

Umayyad governor of al-Andalus from 745 to 746

Thuwaba ibn Salama al-Judhami (Arabic: ثوابة بن سلامة الجذامي) was Umayyad governor of al-Andalus from August 745 until October 746. He was succeeded by Abd al-Rahman ibn Kathir al-Lakhmi.

== See also ==
- Timeline of the Muslim presence in the Iberian peninsula

Preceded by Abu'l-Khattar al-Husam ibn Darar al-Kalbi	Governor of al-Andalus; 745–746	Succeeded by Abd al-Rahman ibn Kathir al-Lakhmi
