= Abd al-Rahman ibn Kathir al-Lakhmi =

Umayyad governor of Al Andalus

Abd al-Rahman ibn Kathīr al-Lakhmī (Arabic: عبد الرحمن بن كثير اللخمي) was the penultimate Umayyad governor of Al Andalus from October 746 until January 747. He was succeeded by Yusuf ibn 'Abd al-Rahman al-Fihri.

== See also ==
- Timeline of the Muslim presence in the Iberian peninsula

Preceded by Tuwaba ibn Salama al-Judhami	Governor of al-Andalus; 746–747	Succeeded by Yusuf ibn Abd al-Rahman al-Fihri
