= List of Umayyad governors of al-Andalus =

The southern part of the Iberian peninsula was under Islamic rule for seven hundred years. In medieval history, "al-Andalus" (Arabic: الأندلس) was the name given to the parts of the Iberian Peninsula and Septimania governed by Arab and North African Muslims (given the generic name of Moors), at various times in the period between 711 and 1492.

== Dependent rulers of al-Andalus ==
Most of the Visigothic Kingdom of Hispania was conquered by the Umayyads in 711-18. Hispania (or al-Andalus) was organized as a single province (wilayah), with local provincial capital at Córdoba, and integrated into their empire. In the administrative structure of the Umayyad Caliphate, al-Andalus was formally a province subordinate to the Umayyad governor of Kairouan in Ifriqiya, rather than directly dependent on the Umayyad Caliph in Damascus. Most of the governors (wali) of al-Andalus from 711 to 756 were provincial deputies appointed by the governor in Kairouan, although a significant number of Andalusian governors during this period were chosen locally, with or without Kairouan's consent. Only one governor was a direct Caliphal appointee for Spain.

Although often characterized as "Umayyad governors", none of these dependent governors were actually members of the Umayyad family. They should not be confused with the later independent Umayyad emirs and caliphs of al-Andalus after 756 (who were indeed Umayyad family members).

Key: All appointed by governor of Ifriqiya except (*) elected internally by Andalusians; (**) appointed directly by Caliph; (***) forcibly imposed by Syrian regiments

- Musa ibn Nusair al-Lakhmi, 712 – September 714 (also governor of Ifriqiya)
- Abd al-Aziz ibn Musa, September 714 – March 716
- Ayyub ibn Habib al-Lakhmi, March 716 – August 716 (*)
- al-Hurr ibn Abd al-Rahman al-Thaqafi, August 716 – March 719
- al-Samh ibn Malik al-Khawlani, March 719 – June 721 (**)
- Abd al-Rahman ibn Abd Allah al-Ghafiqi, July 721 (*)
- Anbasa ibn Suhaym al-Kalbi, August 721 – January 726
- Udhra ibn Abd Allah al-Fihri, January 726 – March 726 (*)
- Yahya ibn Salama al-Kalbi, March 726 – June 728
- Hudhaifa ibn al-Ahwas al-Ashja'i, June 728 – December 728
- Uthman ibn Abi Nis'a al-Khath'ami, December 728 – April 729
- al-Haytham ibn Ubayd al-Kilabi, April 729 – February 730
- Muhammad ibn Abd Allah al-Ashja'i, February 730 – March 730
- Abd al-Rahman ibn Abd Allah al-Ghafiqi, March 730 – October 732 (2nd time, by appointment)
- Abd al-Malik ibn Katan al-Fihri, December 732 – November 734
- Uqba ibn al-Hajjaj al-Saluli, November 734 – December 740
- Abd al-Malik ibn Katan al-Fihri, December 740 – March 742 (*)
- Balj ibn Bishr al-Qushayri, March 742 – August 742 (**/***, technically also governor of Ifriqiya)
- Thalaba ibn Salama al-Amili, August 742 – May 743 (***)
- Abu'l-Khattar al-Husam ibn Darar al-Kalbi, May 743 – August 745
- Thuwaba ibn Salama al-Judhami, August 745 – October 746 (***)
- Abd al-Rahman ibn Qatir al-Lakhmi, October 746 – January 747 (qadi, temporary)
- Yusuf ibn Abd al-Rahman al-Fihri, January 747 – May 756 (*)

== Independent rulers of al-Andalus ==
=== Umayyad emirs of Córdoba ===
In 750, the Abbasid Revolution overthrew the Umayyad caliphate in Damascus. An Umayyad prince, Abd ar-Rahman I, escaped to al-Andalus and set up the independent Emirate of Cordoba.

- Abd ar-Rahman I, 756–788

- Al-Ala ibn Mughith al-Judhami (763), Abbasid counter-claimant
- Abd al-Rahman ibn Habib al-Fihri al-Siqlabi (777), Abbasid counter-claimant

- Hisham I, 788–796
- al-Hakam I, 796–822
- Abd ar-Rahman II, 822–852
- Muhammad I, 852–886
- al-Mundhir, 886–888
- Abdallah ibn Muhammad, 888–912
- Abd ar-Rahman III, 912–929

=== Umayyad caliphs of Córdoba ===
In 929, the Emir Abd ar-Rahman III, proclaimed himself the Caliph, the leader of the Islamic world, in competition with the Abbasid and the Fatimid caliphates which were also active at this time.

- Abd ar-Rahman III, as caliph, 929–961
- Al-Hakam II, 961–976
- Hisham II, 976–1008
- Muhammad II, 1008–1009
- Sulayman II, 1009–1010
- Hisham II, restored, 1010–1012
- Sulayman II, restored, 1012–1016
- Al-Mu'ayti, rival, 1014–1016
- Abd ar-Rahman IV, 1017

=== Hammudid caliphs of Córdoba ===
- Ali ibn Hammud al-Nasir, 1016–1018
- Al-Qasim ibn Hammud al-Ma'mu, 1018–1021
- Yahya ibn Ali ibn Hammud al-Mu'tali, 1021–1023
- Al-Qasim ibn Hammud al-Ma'mu, 1023 (restored)

=== Umayyad caliphs of Córdoba (restored) ===
- Abd-ar-Rahman V, 1023–1024
- Muhammad III, 1024–1025
- interreign of Yahya ibn Ali ibn Hammud al-Mu'tali, 1025–1026
- Hisham III, 1026–1031

Collapse of the Caliphate of Córdoba, end of the Umayyads, beginning of the first Taifa period.

== See also ==
- Caliphate of Córdoba
