= Yusuf ibn Abd al-Rahman al-Fihri =

Arab governor of al-Andalus from 747 to 756

Malik of Andalus
- In office January 750 – May 756
- Preceded by: himself (as Governor)
- Succeeded by: Abd al-Rahman I

Governor of Al-Andalus
- In office January 747 – January 750
- Preceded by: Abd al-Rahman ibn Katir al-Lahmi
- Succeeded by: himself (as Malik)

Personal details
- Born: 711 AD
- Died: 759 AD Toledo, Spain
- Parent: Abd al-Rahman ibn Habib al-Fihri (father)

Yusuf ibn Abd al-Rahman al-Fihri (Arabic: يوسف بن عبد الرحمن الفهري) was an Umayyad governor of Narbonne in Septimania and the governor of al-Andalus from 747 to 750, ruling independently following the collapse of the Umayyad Caliphate in 750. He was a descendant of Uqba ibn Nafi, the founder of Kairouan.

== Governor in Narbonne ==
After the Battle of Poitiers (732), Yusuf ibn Abd al-Rahman was appointed governor of Narbonne according to the Chronicle of Moissac, where he was in command of military operations. During four years he is said to have raided and pillaged the Lower Rhone, and in 735 he took Arles.

Between 716 and 756, al-Andalus was ruled by governors sent from Damascus or appointed on the recommendation of the Umayyad regional governors of Ifriqiya to which it belonged administratively. Like many of his predecessors, Yusuf struggled to control infighting between the Berbers (the bulk of his power base) and the Arabs, and also had to deal with perennial feuding between 'Adnani and Qahtani Arab tribes comprising his forces.

== Governor of al-Andalus ==
After the instability of the Berber Revolt in al-Andalus, an arrangement was concluded between different Arab factions to alternate in office. However, after taking over and completing his term, he refused to give up the reins of power, ruling unchallenged for nine years, while in Damascus the Umayyads were definitively overthrown in 750. It has been pointed out that he actually ruled as king (malik), and not as governor (wali). After becoming ruler, al-Fihri conducted a census, as part of which Bishop Hostegesis prepared a list of tax and jizya payers. The bishop then made annual visits to make sure the taxes were collected properly.

Yusuf had just broken an attempted revolt in Zaragoza (755) when he launched a campaign against the Basques of Pamplona in 755, but the detachment sent was annihilated. This was the moment chosen by the Umayyad prince Abd al-Rahman ibn Mu'awiya ibn Hisham, who had fled Syria some years before to escape from the Abbasids, to disembark on the southern coast of present-day Spain. He went on to capture important southern strongholds such as Málaga and Seville.

On Abd al-Rahman's arrival, Andalusian forces were divided, with both commanders claiming the allegiance of both Berbers and the Syrian junds. Generally, Yemeni units within the latter joined the Umayyad contender, while their Mudar and Qays rivals remained loyal to Yusuf. After attempting a failed compromise with Abd al-Rahman by which the Umayyad survivor would succeed him, Yusuf al-Fihri was defeated at the Battle of Musarah just outside Córdoba in March 756 by Abd al-Rahman, who thus became the first independent Emir of Córdoba.

Still Yusuf managed to flee the battlefield north and make his way towards Toledo, possibly first attempting to recapture Seville, but failing. Yusuf may have been killed on his retreat to Toledo, while other accounts locate him in that stronghold still for two or three years, where he was eventually killed by some of his own men.

== See also ==
- Umayyad conquest of Hispania
- Septimania
- Battle of Avignon
- Battle of Narbonne (737)
- Timeline of the Muslim presence in the Iberian peninsula

Preceded by Abd al-Rahman ibn Katir al-Lahmi	Governor of Al-Andalus; 747–756	Succeeded by Abd al-Rahman I as Emir of Córdoba
