= Al-Andalus =

Muslim-ruled parts of the Iberian Peninsula (711–1492)

Coordinates: 37°N 4°W

Umayyad Hispania at its greatest extent in 719 AD

Caliphate of Córdoba c. 1000 AD, at the zenith of Almanzor

Al-Andalus (Arabic: الأَنْدَلُس, romanised: al-ʾAndalus) (Note: Other translations: Aragonese: al-Andalus; Asturian: al-Ándalus; Basque: al-Andalus; Berber: ⴰⵏⴷⴰⵍⵓⵙ, romanised: Andalus; Catalan: al-Àndalus; Galician: al-Andalus; Occitan: Al Andalús; Portuguese: al-Ândalus; Spanish: al-Ándalus.; Also known in English, perhaps in a slightly dated or quaint sense, as Moorish Spain.) refers to the various Muslim ruled territories on the Iberian Peninsula that existed between 711 and 1492. At its height, it covered the entirety of Spain and Portugal, as well as parts of southern France. The name refers to the different Muslim states that controlled these territories at various times between 711 and 1492. At its greatest geographical extent, it occupied most of the peninsula as well as Septimania under Umayyad rule. These boundaries changed through a series of conquests that Western historiography has traditionally characterised as the Reconquista, eventually shrinking to the south and finally to the Emirate of Granada.

As a political domain, it successively constituted a province of the Umayyad Caliphate, initiated by the Caliph al-Walid I (711–750); the Emirate of Córdoba (c. 750–929); the Caliphate of Córdoba (929–1031); the first taifa kingdoms (1009–1110); the Almoravid Empire (1085–1145); the second taifa period (1140–1203); the Almohad Caliphate (1147–1238); the third taifa period (1232–1287); and ultimately the Nasrid Emirate of Granada (1238–1492). Under the Caliphate of Córdoba, the city of Córdoba became one of the leading cultural and economic centres of the Mediterranean Basin, Europe, and the Islamic world. Achievements that advanced Islamic and Western science came from al-Andalus, including major advances in trigonometry (Jabir ibn Aflah), astronomy (al-Zarqali), surgery (al-Zahrawi), pharmacology (Ibn Zuhr), and agronomy (Ibn Bassal and Abu'l-Khayr al-Ishbili). Al-Andalus became a conduit for cultural and scientific exchange between the Islamic and Christian worlds.

For much of its history, al-Andalus existed in conflict with Christian kingdoms to the north. After the fall of the Umayyad Caliphate of Cordoba by 1031, al-Andalus was fragmented into taifa states and principalities, some of which (such as the Taifa of Toledo, the Taifa of Zaragoza, the Taifa of Seville and the Taifa of Badajoz) reached considerable territorial extent. After the Christian capture of Toledo in 1085, the Almoravid empire intervened and repelled attacks on the region, then brought al-Andalus under direct Almoravid rule. For the next century and a half, al-Andalus became a province of the Muslim empires of the Almoravids and their successors, the Almohads, both based in Marrakesh.

Ultimately, the northern Christian kingdoms overpowered the Muslim states to the south. In the 13th century, most of the south quickly fell under Christian rule, with Gharb al-Andalus, the Guadalquivir Valley and Eastern al-Andalus falling to Portuguese, Castilian, and Aragonese conquests. This left the Emirate of Granada as the remaining Muslim state on the Iberian Peninsula, which became a tributary state of the Crown of Castile, before surrendering in 1492 to the Catholic Monarchs.

== Etymology ==
The toponym al-Andalus is first attested by inscriptions on coins minted in 716 by the new Muslim government of Iberia. These coins, called dinars, were inscribed in both Latin and Arabic. The etymology of the name al-Andalus has traditionally been derived from the name of the Vandals (vándalos in Spanish, vândalos in Portuguese).

Since the 1980s, several alternative etymologies have challenged this tradition. In 1986, Joaquín Vallvé proposed that al-Andalus was a corruption of the name Atlantis. Heinz Halm in 1989 derived the name from a Gothic term *landahlauts (allotted land), and in 2002, Georg Bossong suggested its derivation from a pre-Roman substrate.

== History ==
=== Province of the Umayyad Caliphate ===
Expansion of the Caliphate Muhammad, 622–632 Rashidun Caliphate, 632–661 Umayyad Caliphate, 661–750

During the caliphate of the Umayyad Caliph Al-Walid I, the commander Tariq ibn-Ziyad led an army of 7,000 that landed at Gibraltar on 30 April 711, ostensibly to intervene in a Visigothic civil war. After a decisive victory over King Roderic at the Battle of Guadalete on 19 July 711, Tariq, accompanied by his mawla, governor Musa ibn Nusayr of Ifriqiya, brought most of the Visigothic Kingdom under Muslim rule in a seven-year campaign. They crossed the Pyrenees and occupied Visigothic Septimania in southern France.

Most of the Iberian peninsula became part of the expanding Umayyad Empire, under the name of al-Andalus. It was organised as a province subordinate to Ifriqiya, so, for the first few decades, the governors of al-Andalus were appointed by the emir of Kairouan, rather than the Caliph in Damascus. The regional capital was set at Córdoba, and the first influx of Muslim settlers was widely distributed.

Following the Muslim conquest of Spain, al-Andalus, then at its greatest extent, was divided into five administrative units, corresponding very roughly to: modern Andalusia; Castile and León; Navarre, Aragon, and Catalonia; Portugal and Galicia; and the Languedoc-Roussillon area of Occitania.

The small army Tariq led in the initial conquest consisted mostly of Berbers, while Musa's largely Arab force of over 12,000 soldiers was accompanied by a group of mawālī (Arabic, موالي), that is, non-Arab Muslims, who were clients of the Arabs. The Berber soldiers accompanying Tariq were garrisoned in the centre and the north of the peninsula, as well as in the Pyrenees, while the Berber colonists who followed settled in all parts of the country – north, east, south and west. Visigothic lords who agreed to recognise Muslim suzerainty were allowed to retain their fiefs (notably, in Murcia, Galicia, and the Ebro valley). Resistant Visigoths took refuge in the Cantabrian highlands, where they carved out a rump state, the Kingdom of Asturias.

The province of al-Andalus in 750

In the 720s, the al-Andalus governors launched several sa'ifa raids into Aquitaine but were decisively defeated by Duke Odo the Great of Aquitaine at the Battle of Toulouse (721). However, after crushing Odo's Berber ally Uthman ibn Naissa in the eastern Pyrenees, Abdul Rahman Al Ghafiqi led an expedition north across the western Pyrenees and defeated the Aquitanian duke, who in turn appealed to the Frankish leader Charles Martel for assistance, offering to place himself under Carolingian sovereignty. At the Battle of Poitiers in 732, the al-Andalus raiding army was defeated by Charles Martel and Al Ghafiqi was killed. In 734, the Andalusi launched raids to the east, capturing Avignon and Arles, and overran much of Provence. In 737, they travelled up the Rhône valley, reaching as far north as Burgundy. Charles Martel of the Franks, with the assistance of Liutprand of the Lombards, invaded Burgundy and Provence and expelled the raiders by 739.

In 740, a Berber Revolt erupted in the Maghreb (North Africa). To put down the rebellion, the Umayyad Caliph Hisham dispatched a large Arab army, composed of regiments (Junds) from Bilad Ash-Sham, to North Africa. This Umayyad army was defeated by the Berber rebels at the Battle of Bagdoura (in Morocco). Heartened by the victories of their North African brethren, the Berbers of al-Andalus quickly raised their own revolt. Berber garrisons in the north of the Iberian Peninsula mutinied, deposed their Arab commanders, and organised a large rebel army to march against the strongholds of Toledo, Córdoba, and Algeciras.

In 741, Balj bin Bishr led a detachment of some 10,000 Arab troops across the straits. The Arab governor of al-Andalus, joined by this force, was victorious over the Berber rebels in a series of battles in 742. A dispute erupted between the Syrian commanders and the Andalusi, the so-called "original Arabs" of the earlier contingents. The Syrians defeated them at the hard-fought Battle of Aqua Portora in August 742 but were too few to impose themselves on the province.

The quarrel was settled in 743 when Abū l-Khaṭṭār al-Ḥusām, the new governor of al-Andalus, assigned the Syrians to regimental fiefs across al-Andalus – the Damascus jund was established in Elvira (Granada), the Jordan jund in Rayyu (Málaga and Archidona), the Jund Filastin (Palestine) in Medina-Sidonia and Jerez, the Emesa (Hims) jund in Seville and Niebla, and the Qinnasrin jund in Jaén. The Egypt jund was divided between Beja (Alentejo) in the west and Tudmir (Murcia) in the east. The arrival of the Syrians substantially increased the Arab element in the Iberian peninsula and helped strengthen the Muslim hold on the south. However, at the same time, unwilling to be governed, the Syrian junds carried on an existence of autonomous feudal anarchy, severely destabilising the authority of the governor of al-Andalus.

A second significant consequence of the revolt was the expansion of the Kingdom of the Asturias, hitherto confined to enclaves in the Cantabrian highlands. After the rebellious Berber garrisons evacuated the northern frontier fortresses, the Christian king Alfonso I of Asturias set about immediately seizing the empty forts for himself, quickly adding the northwestern provinces of Galicia and León to his fledgling kingdom. The Asturians evacuated the Christian populations from the towns and villages of the Galician-Leonese lowlands, creating an empty buffer zone in the Douro River valley (the "Desert of the Duero"). This newly emptied frontier remained roughly in place for the next few centuries as the boundary between the Christian north and the Islamic south. On the Muslim side of the frontier, al-Andalus had three large march territories (thaghr, pl. thughūr): the Lower March (capital at Mérida and Badajoz, featuring a population primarily of Berber and Muwallad stock), the Middle March (centred at Toledo, primarily muwallad), and the Upper March (centred at Zaragoza, with a more intricate ethnic mix and a more substantial population of Arab stock as well as maintaining more complex relations with its Carolingian and Navarrese neighbours).

These disturbances and disorder also allowed the Franks, now under the leadership of Pepin the Short, to invade the strategic strip of Septimania in 752, hoping to deprive al-Andalus of an easy launching pad for raids into Francia. After a lengthy siege, the last Arab stronghold, the citadel of Narbonne, finally fell to the Franks in 759. Al-Andalus was sealed off at the Pyrenees.

The third consequence of the Berber revolt was the collapse of the authority of the Damascus Caliphate over the western provinces. With the Umayyad Caliphs distracted by the challenge of the Abbasids in the east, the western provinces of the Maghreb and al-Andalus spun out of their control. From around 745, the Fihrids, an illustrious local Arab clan descended from Oqba ibn Nafi al-Fihri, seized power in the western provinces and ruled them almost as a private family empire of their own – Abd al-Rahman ibn Habib al-Fihri in Ifriqiya and Yūsuf al-Fihri in al-Andalus. The Fihrids welcomed the fall of the Umayyads in the east, in 750, and sought to reach an understanding with the Abbasids, hoping they might be allowed to continue their autonomous existence. But when the Abbasids rejected the offer and demanded submission, the Fihrids declared independence and, probably out of spite, invited the deposed remnants of the Umayyad clan to take refuge in their dominions. It was a fateful decision that they soon regretted, for the Umayyads, the sons and grandsons of caliphs, had a more legitimate claim to rule than the Fihrids themselves. Rebellious-minded local lords, disenchanted with the autocratic rule of the Fihrids, conspired with the arriving Umayyad exiles.

=== Umayyad Emirate of Córdoba ===
==== Establishment ====
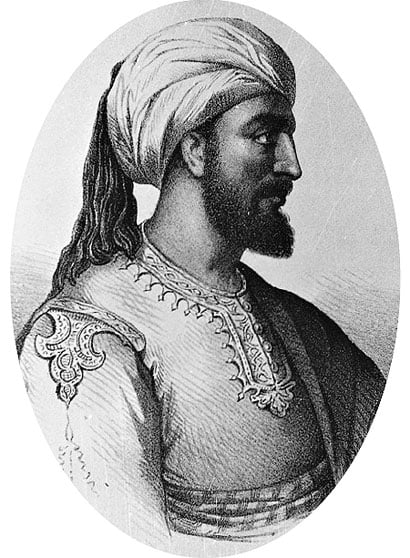
19th-century portrait of Abd al-Rahman I, from Estoria de España

In 755, the exiled Umayyad prince Abd al-Rahman I (also called al-Dākhil, the 'Immigrant') arrived on the coast of Spain. He had fled the Abbasids, who had overthrown the Umayyads in Damascus and were slaughtering members of that family, and then he spent four years in exile in North Africa, assessing the political situation in al-Andalus across the Straits of Gibraltar, before he landed at Almuñécar.

News of his arrival spread across al-Andalus, and when word reached its governor, Yūsuf al-Fihri, he was not pleased. During this time, Abd al-Rahman and his supporters quickly conquered Málaga and then Seville, finally besieging the capital of al-Andalus, Córdoba. Abd al-Rahman's army was exhausted after their conquest, meanwhile Governor Yūsuf al-Fihri had returned from quashing another rebellion with his army. The siege of Córdoba began, and noticing the starving state of Abd al-Rahman's army, al-Fihri began throwing lavish feasts every day as the siege went on, to tempt Abd al Rahman's supporters to defect to his side. However, Abd al-Rahman persisted, even rejecting a truce that would have allowed Abd al-Rahman to marry al-Fihri's daughter. After decisively defeating Yūsuf al-Fihri's army, Abd al-Rahman was able to conquer Córdoba, where he proclaimed himself emir in 756. The rest of al-Andalus was easily conquered, and Abd al-Rahman soon had control of all of al-Andalus.

==== Rule ====
Abd al Rahman's rule was stable in the years after his conquest – he built major public works, most famously the Mosque of Córdoba, and helped urbanise the emirate while defending it from invaders, including the quashing of numerous rebellions, and decisively repelling the invasion by Charlemagne (which would later inspire the epic, Chanson de Roland). By far the most important of these invasions was the attempted reconquest by the Abbasid Caliphate. In 763 Caliph Al-Mansur of the Abbasids installed al-Ala ibn-Mugith as governor of Africa (whose title gave him dominion over the province of al-Andalus). He planned to invade and destroy the Emirate of Córdoba, so in response Abd al Rahman fortified himself within the fortress of Carmona with a tenth as many soldiers as al-Ala ibn-Mugith. After a long siege, it appeared that Abd al Rahman would be defeated, but in a last stand Abd al Rahman with his outnumbered forces opened the gates of the fortress and charged at the resting Abbasid army, and decisively defeated them. After being sent the embalmed head of al-Ala ibn-Mugith, it is said Al Mansur exclaimed "Praise be to God who has put the sea between me and this devil!"

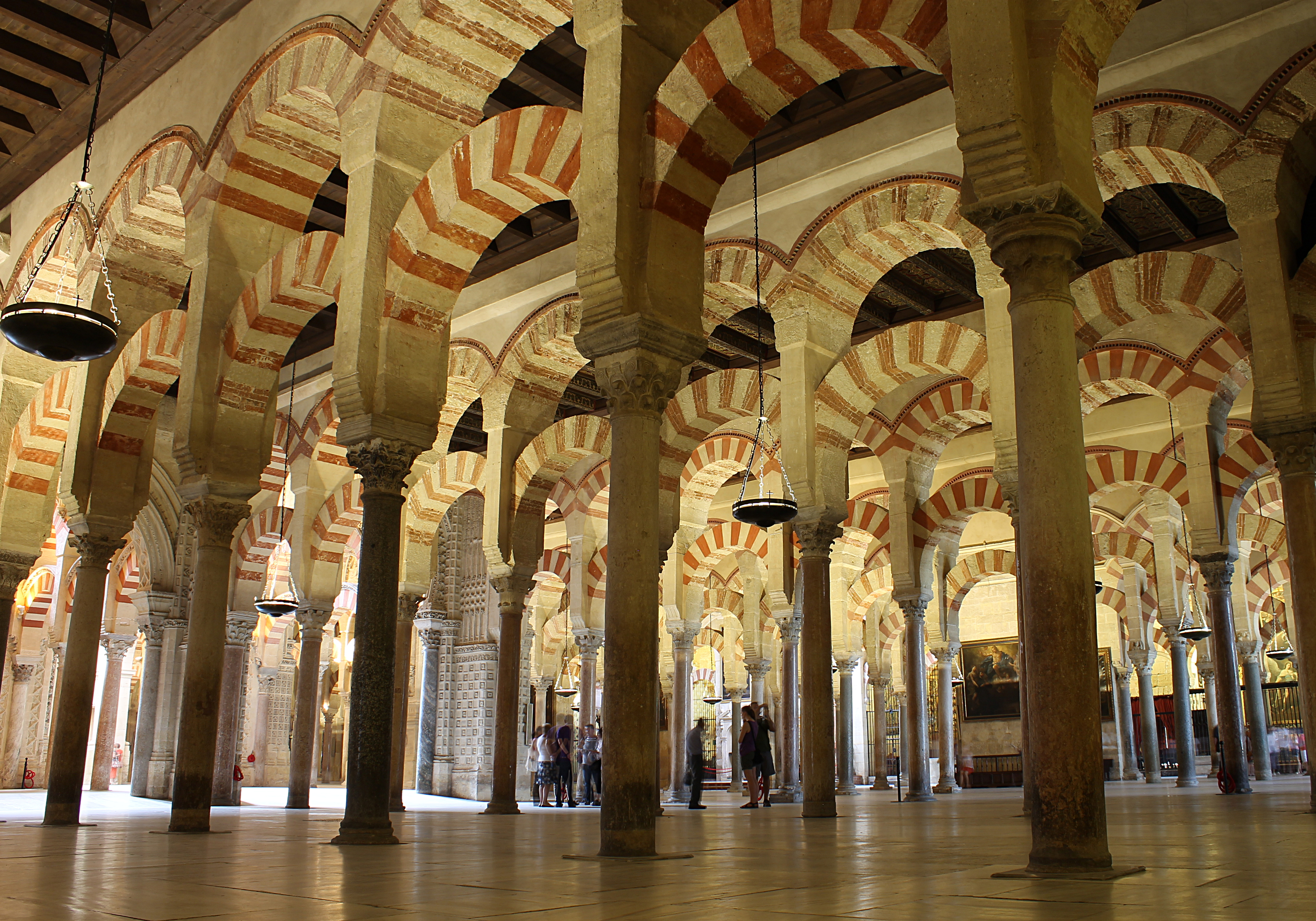
Interior of the Mosque–Cathedral of Córdoba, the former Great Mosque built by Abd ar-Rahman I in 785, later expanded by his successors

Abd al Rahman I died in 788 after a lengthy and prosperous reign. He was succeeded by his son, Hisham I, who secured power by exiling his brother who had tried to rebel against him. Hisham enjoyed a stable reign of eight years and was succeeded by his son Al-Hakam I. The next few decades were relatively uneventful, with only occasional minor rebellions, and saw the rise of the emirate. In 822 Al Hakam died and was succeeded by Abd al-Rahman II, the first great emir of Córdoba. He rose to power with no opposition and sought to reform the emirate. He quickly reorganised the bureaucracy to be more efficient and built many mosques across the emirate. During his reign science and art flourished, as many scholars fled the Abbasid caliphate due to the disastrous Fourth Fitna. The scholar Abbas ibn Firnas made an attempt to fly, though accounts vary on his success. In 852 Abd al Rahman II died, leaving behind him a powerful and well-established state that had become one of the most powerful in the Mediterranean.

Abd al Rahman was succeeded by Muhammad I of Córdoba, who according to legend had to wear women's clothing to sneak into the imperial palace and be crowned, since he was not the heir apparent. His reign marked a decline in the emirate, which was ended by Abd al-Rahman III. Muhammad's reign was marked by multiple rebellions, which were dealt with poorly and weakened the emirate, most disastrously following the rebellion of Umar ibn Hafsun. When Muhammad died, he was succeeded by emir Abdullah ibn Muhammad al-Umawi whose power barely reached outside of the city of Córdoba. As Ibn Hafsun ravaged the south, Abdullah did almost nothing, and slowly became more and more isolated, barely speaking to anyone. Abdullah purged his administration of his brothers, which lessened the bureaucracy's loyalty towards him. Around this time several local Arab lords began to revolt, including one Kurayb ibn Khaldun, who was able to conquer Seville. Some loyalists tried to quell the rebellion, but without proper material support, their efforts were in vain.

He declared that the next emir would be his grandson Abd al-Rahman III, ignoring the claims of his four living children. Abdullah died in 912, and the throne passed to Abd al Rahman III. Through force of arms and diplomacy, he put down the rebellions that had disrupted his grandfather's reign, obliterating Ibn Hafsun and hunting down his sons. After this he led several sieges against the Christians, sacking the city of Pamplona, and restoring some prestige to the emirate. Meanwhile, across the sea the Fatimids had risen up in force, ousted the Abbasid government in North Africa, and declared themselves a caliphate. Inspired by this action, Abd al Rahman joined the rebellion and declared himself caliph in 929.

For nearly 100 years under the Córdoban Umayyad period, from the 9th century to the 10th, al-Andalus also extended its presence from Fraxinetum into the Alps with a series of organised raids.

=== Umayyad Caliphate of Córdoba ===
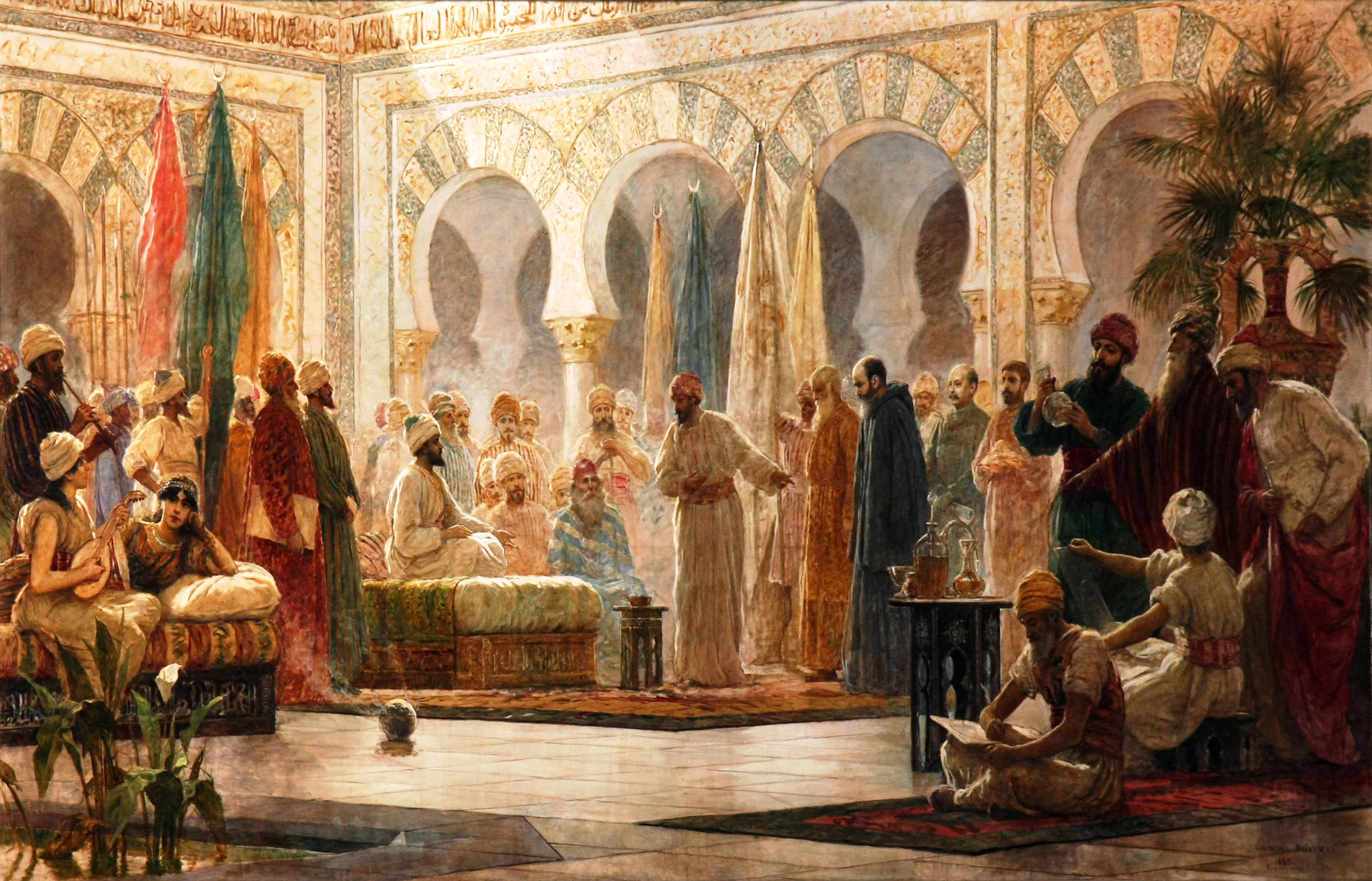
Abd al-Rahman III receiving John of Gorze, ambassador of Otto I, at the Medina Azahara, by Dionisio Baixeras Verdaguer, 1885

The period of the Caliphate is seen as the golden age of al-Andalus. Córdoba under the Caliphate, with a population of more than half a million, eventually overtook Constantinople as the largest and most prosperous city in the world. Al-Andalus became a centre for the arts, medicine, science, music, literature and philosophy. The work of its most important philosophers and scientists, such as Abulcasis and Averroes, had a major influence on the intellectual life of medieval Europe. Muslims and non-Muslims often came from abroad to study at the libraries and universities of al-Andalus, and after the reconquest of Toledo, several translation institutions such as the Toledo School of Translators were established for translating books and texts from Arabic into Latin. The most noted figures in this were Gerard of Cremona and Michael Scot, who took these works to Italy. The transmission of ideas significantly affected the formation of the European Renaissance.

The Caliphate of Córdoba also had extensive trade with other parts of the Mediterranean, including Christian parts. Trade goods included luxury items (silk, ceramics, gold), essential foodstuffs (grain, olive oil, wine), and containers (such as ceramics for storing perishables). In the tenth century, Amalfitans were already trading Fatimid and Byzantine silks in Córdoba. Later references to Amalfitan merchants were sometimes used to emphasise the previous golden age of Córdoba. Fatimid Egypt was a supplier of many luxury goods, including elephant tusks, and raw or carved crystals. The Fatimids were traditionally thought to be the only supplier of such goods, and control over these trade routes would be a cause for conflict between the Umayyads and Fatimids.

=== Taifas period ===
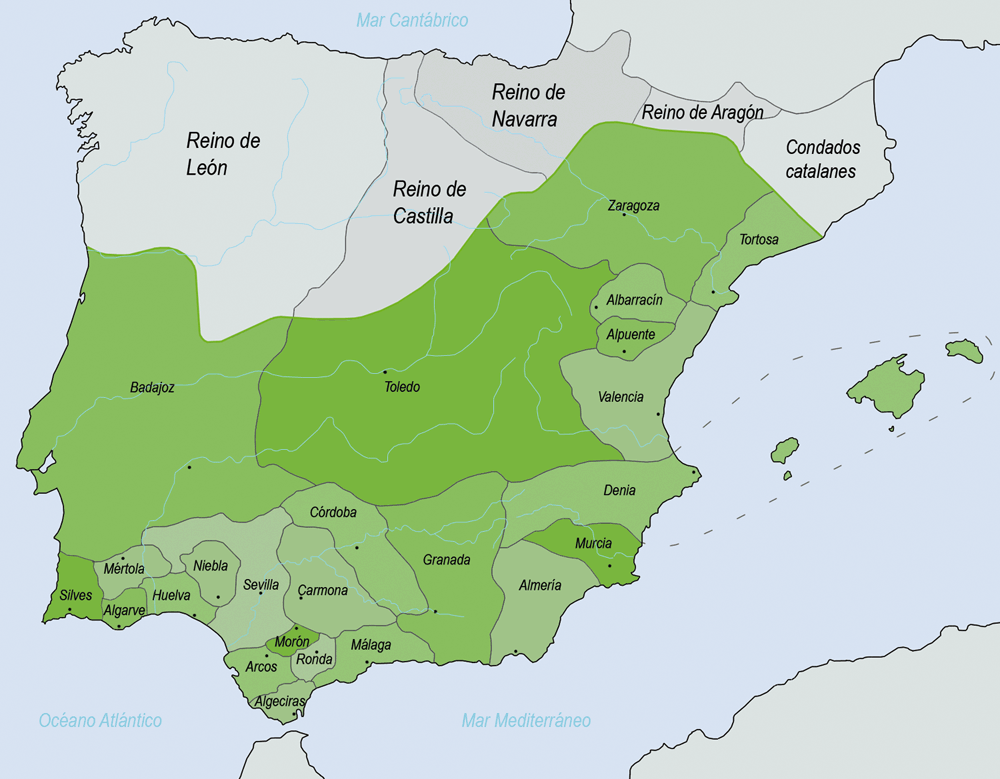
The taifas (green) in 1031 AD

The Caliphate of Córdoba effectively collapsed during a ruinous civil war between 1009 and 1013, although it was not finally abolished until 1031 when al-Andalus broke up into a number of mostly independent mini-states and principalities called taifas. In 1013, invading Berbers sacked Córdoba, massacring its inhabitants, pillaging the city, and burning the palace complex to the ground. The largest of the taifas to emerge were Badajoz (Batalyaws), Toledo (Ṭulayṭulah), Zaragoza (Saraqusta), and Granada (Ġarnāṭah). After 1031, the taifas were generally too weak to defend themselves against repeated raids and demands for tribute from the Christian states to the north and west, which were known to the Muslims as "the Galician nations", and which had spread from their initial strongholds in Galicia, Asturias, Cantabria, the Basque country, and the Carolingian Marca Hispanica to become the Kingdoms of Navarre, León, Portugal, Castile and Aragon, and the County of Barcelona. During the eleventh century several centres of power existed among the taifas, and the political situation shifted rapidly. Before the rise of the Almoravids from Africa or the Christians from the north, the Abbadid-ruled Taifa of Seville succeeded in conquering a dozen lesser kingdoms, becoming the most powerful and renowned of the taifas, such that it could have laid claim to be the true heir to the Caliphate of Córdoba. The taifas were vulnerable and divided but had immense wealth. During its prominence the Taifa of Seville produced technically complex lustreware and exerted significant influence on ceramic production across al-Andalus.

In the 1080s, the taifa kingdoms began to face an existential threat from the Christian kingdoms to the north, as Alfonso VI of Castile escalated attacks against them. In 1083, he led a punitive expedition against Seville that reached all the way to Tarifa at the southern tip of al-Andalus. In 1085, he annexed Toledo, a turning point which galvanised the remaining taifa leaders into seeking outside help.

=== Almoravids and Almohads ===
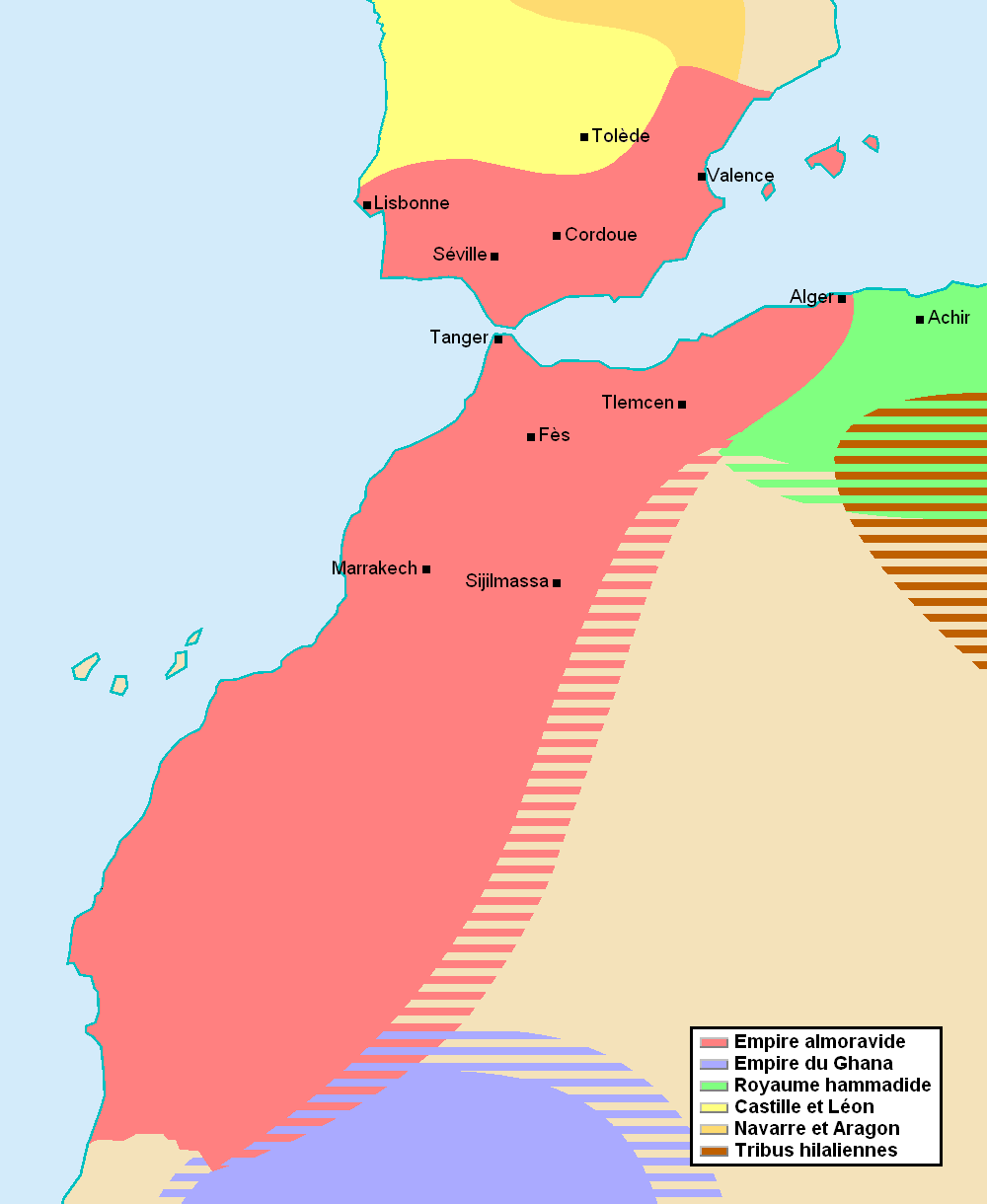
Map showing the extent of the Almoravid empire

After the fall of Toledo, most of the major taifa rulers agreed to request the intervention of the Almoravids, a Berber empire based in Marrakesh that had conquered much of northwest Africa. The Almoravid leader, Yusuf Ibn Tashfin, led several campaigns into al-Andalus, initially in defence of the taifa kingdoms. At the Battle of Sagrajas (or Battle of Zallaqa in Arabic), a Muslim army led by the Almoravids soundly defeated Alfonso VI. By 1090, however, Yusuf ibn Tashfin was disillusioned with the disunity of the taifa leaders and he returned on a campaign to conquer al-Andalus instead. Most of the taifas, except for Zaragoza, were annexed by 1094. Valencia, which had come under the control of El Cid at the end of its taifa period, was eventually occupied in 1102, after El Cid's death. Zaragoza was annexed in 1110.

Modern scholarship has sometimes admitted originality in North African architecture, but according to Yasser Tabbaa, historian of Islamic art and architecture, the Iberocentric viewpoint is anachronistic when considering the political and cultural environment during the rule of the Almoravid dynasty. The rise and fall of the Almoravids is sometimes seen as an expression of Ibn Khaldun's asabiyyah paradigm.

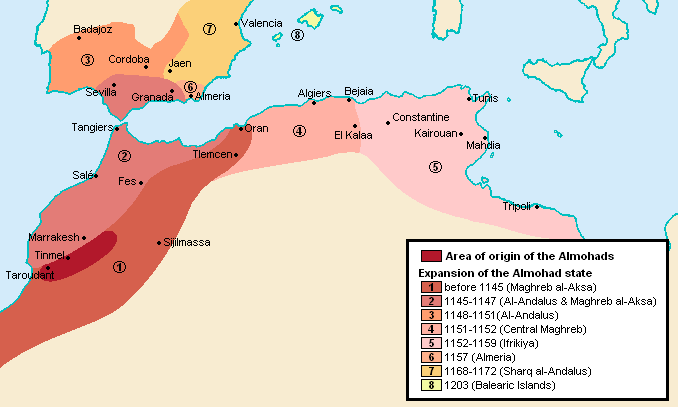
Expansion of the Almohad state in the 12th century

By 1147, the Almoravids were overthrown in North Africa by the Almohads, another Berber dynasty, under the leadership of Abd al-Mu'min. As Almoravid rule collapsed, another brief period of taifa kingdoms followed in al-Andalus, during which the Christian kingdoms expanded southward again. From 1146 onward, the Almohads intervened and took control of al-Andalus. One of Abd al-Mu'min's successors, Ya'qub al-Mansur, won a major victory over the Castilian Alfonso VIII at the Battle of Alarcos in 1195.

In 1212, a coalition of Christian kings under the leadership of Alfonso VIII defeated the Almohads at the Battle of Las Navas de Tolosa. Almohad rule was diminished in prestige and in 1228 the Almohad caliph al-Ma'mun withdrew from al-Andalus altogether. In this political vacuum, a new wave of taifa kingdoms emerged, which were progressively conquered by Portugal, Castile, and Aragon. Córdoba was conquered in 1236 and Seville was conquered in 1248. Some Muslim city-states, such as Murcia and Niebla, survived as vassal kingdoms of Castile until the 1260s. Only the region of Granada remained unconquered.

=== Emirate of Granada, its fall, and aftermath ===
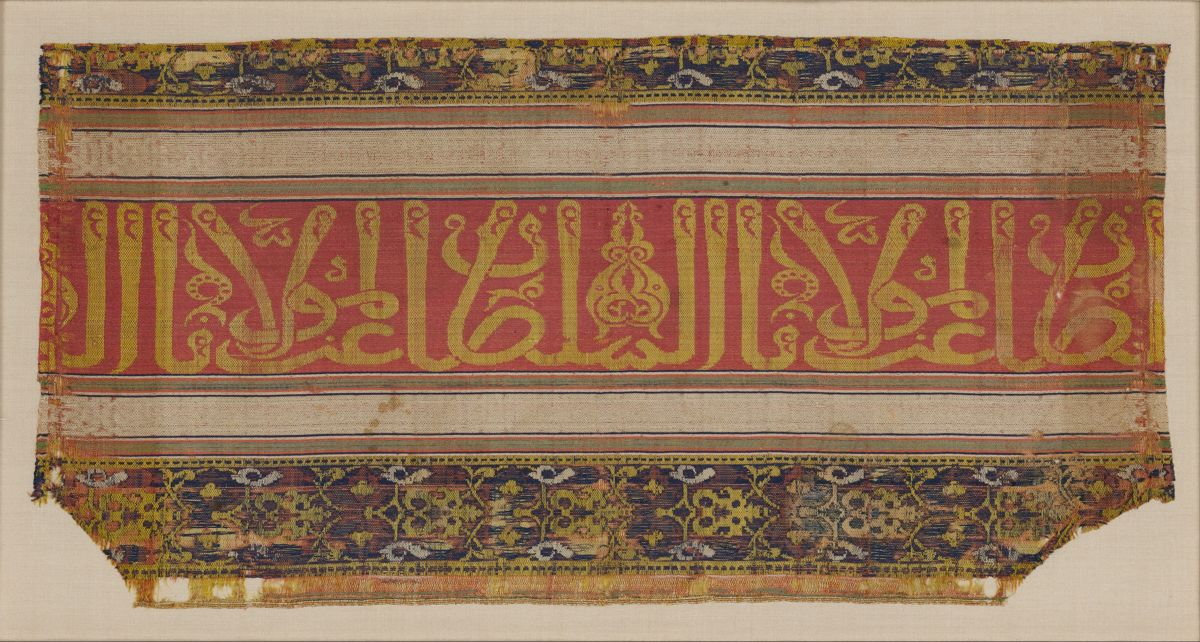
A silk textile fragment from the last Muslim dynasty of Al-Andalus, the Nasrid Dynasty (1232–1492), with the epigraphic inscription "glory to our lord the Sultan".

From the mid 13th to the late 15th century, the only remaining domain of al-Andalus was the Emirate of Granada, the last Muslim stronghold in the Iberian Peninsula. The emirate was established by Muhammad ibn al-Ahmar in 1230 and was ruled by the Nasrid dynasty, the longest reigning dynasty in the history of al-Andalus. Although surrounded by Castilian lands, the emirate was wealthy through being tightly integrated in Mediterranean trade networks and enjoyed a period of considerable cultural and economic prosperity.

Despite internal conflicts, the Nasrids of Granada were able to survive in part by playing the Christian kingdoms of the north against each other, while at other times soliciting aid from the Marinids, a new Berber dynasty ruling in North Africa from their capital in Fez. For much of its existence, Granada paid tribute to the Castilian kings. Along with this political status, its favourable geographic location, with the Sierra Nevada as a natural barrier, helped to prolong Nasrid rule.

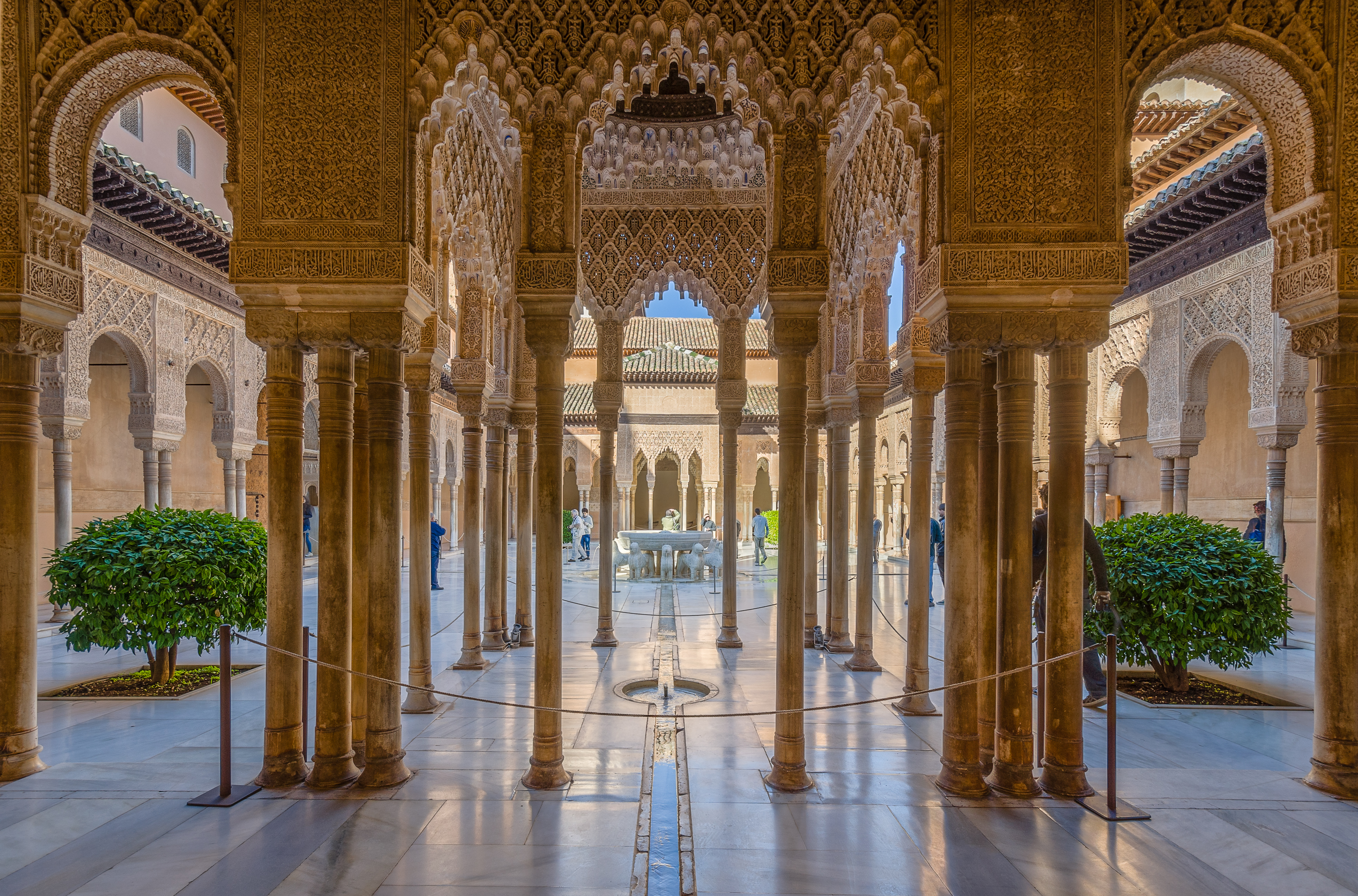
The Court of the Lions in the Alhambra, the palace of Nasrid Granada

Granada also accommodated a large number of Muslim refugees fleeing the Reconquista or expelled from Christian-controlled territories, which grew the city and the emirate's population. The city even became one of the largest in Europe throughout the 15th century in terms of population. The most visible legacy of the Nasrids is the Alhambra, their fortified palace complex, partly preserved today. The independent Nasrid kingdom was also a trade hub between the Atlantic and Mediterranean, and was frequented especially by Genoese merchants.

The Marinids intervened in the south of the Iberian Peninsula multiple times up until their defeat at the Battle of Río Salado in 1340. After this, they ceased to play a major role. The subsequent internal turmoil within Castile, however, helped Nasrid Granada to enjoy a period of relative external peace and internal prosperity until the end of the 14th century, under the reigns of Yusuf I (r. 1333–1354) and Muhammad V (r. 1354–1359, 1362–1391). Important cultural figures, such as Ibn al-Khatib, Ibn Zamrak, and Ibn Khaldun all served in the Nasrid court during this period.

In 1468, Isabella, the only child of Henry IV of Castile, married Ferdinand, the son of John II of Aragon, and by 1479 they were rulers of a united Castile and Aragon. This development meant that Granada could no longer exploit divisions between the two kingdoms and the new royal couple, also known as the Catholic Monarchs, were united in their intention to conquer it. The final war to conquer Granada began in earnest in 1482. Year by year, the Christian advance captured new cities and fortresses until the last Nasrid ruler, Muhammad XI (known as Boabdil to the Christians), formally surrendered Granada to the Catholic Monarchs on 2 January 1492.

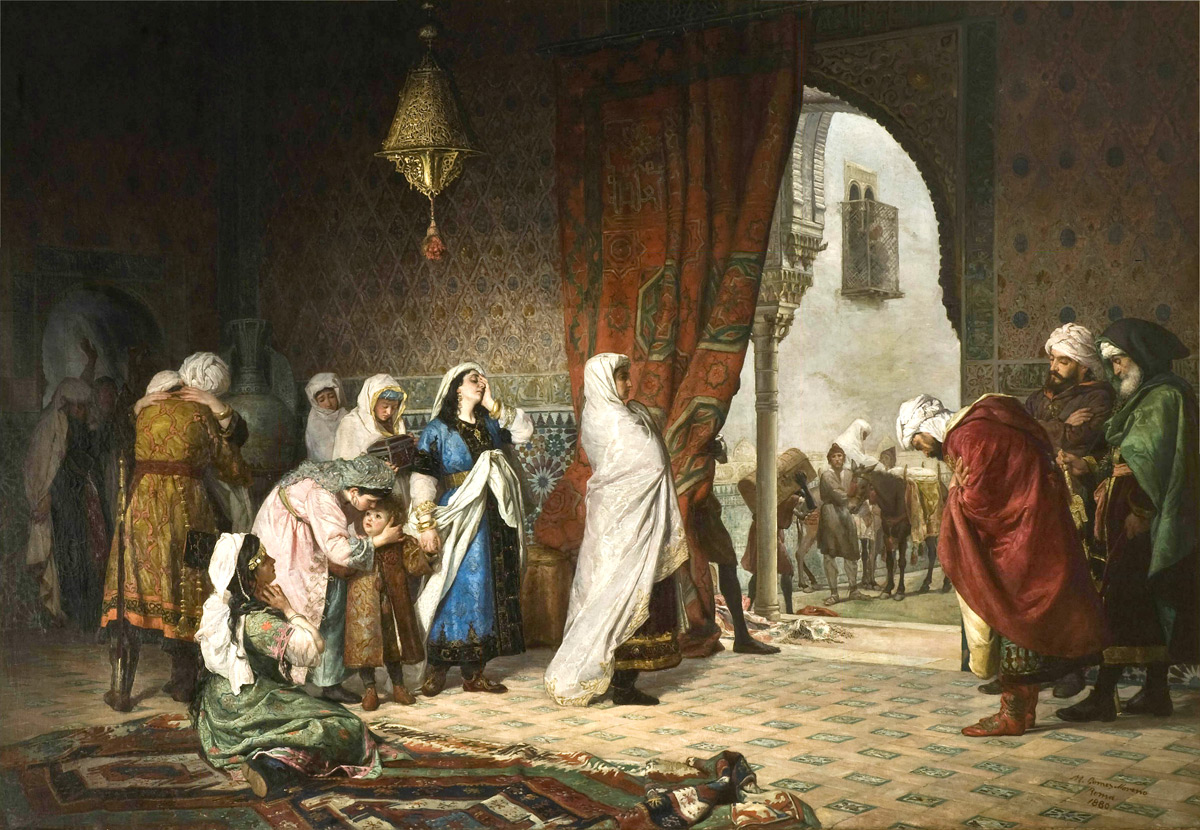
Manuel Gómez-Moreno González's 19th-century depiction of Muhammad XI's family in the Alhambra moments after the fall of Granada.

By this time Muslims in Castile numbered half a million. After the fall, "100,000 had died or been enslaved, 200,000 emigrated, and 200,000 remained as the residual population. Many of the Muslim elite, including Muhammad XI, who had been given the area of the Alpujarras mountains as a principality, found life under Christian rule intolerable and passed over into North Africa." Under the conditions of the Capitulations of 1492, the Muslims in Granada were to be allowed to continue to practice their religion. From 1492 to 1493, tens of thousands of expulsed Muslims and Jews from al-Andalus were rescued when the Ottomans under orders of Sultan Bayezid II sent ships. Thousands of Jews were transported to Ottoman lands, and many settled in North Africa.

Mass forced conversions of Muslims in 1499 led to a revolt that spread to Alpujarras and the mountains of Ronda; after this uprising the capitulations were revoked. In 1502 the Catholic Monarchs decreed the forced conversion of all Muslims living under the rule of the Crown of Castile, although in the kingdoms of Aragon and Valencia (both now part of Spain) the open practice of Islam was allowed until 1526. Descendants of the Muslims were subject to expulsions from Spain between 1609 and 1614 (see Expulsion of the Moriscos). The last mass prosecution against Moriscos for crypto-Islamic practices occurred in Granada in 1727, with most of those convicted receiving relatively light sentences. The Morisco community including these final convicts kept their identity alive at least through the late eighteenth century.

== Science ==
There was much scientific activity in al-Andalus, especially in the fields of medicine, astronomy, mathematics, and agronomy. At the same time, Andalusi scholars were also highly active in philosophy (see below), especially in the field of logic. The earliest evidence of such activities in al-Andalus dates to the reign of Abd ar-Rahman II (r. 822–852), when developments were spurred by exposure to older works translated from, Greek, Persian and other languages. Scientific studies continued to be pursued in the following centuries, though certain fields and subjects thrived more depending on the period. Scholars often worked in many different and overlapping subjects, so it is difficult to place those discussed here into a single scientific field each.

=== Medicine ===
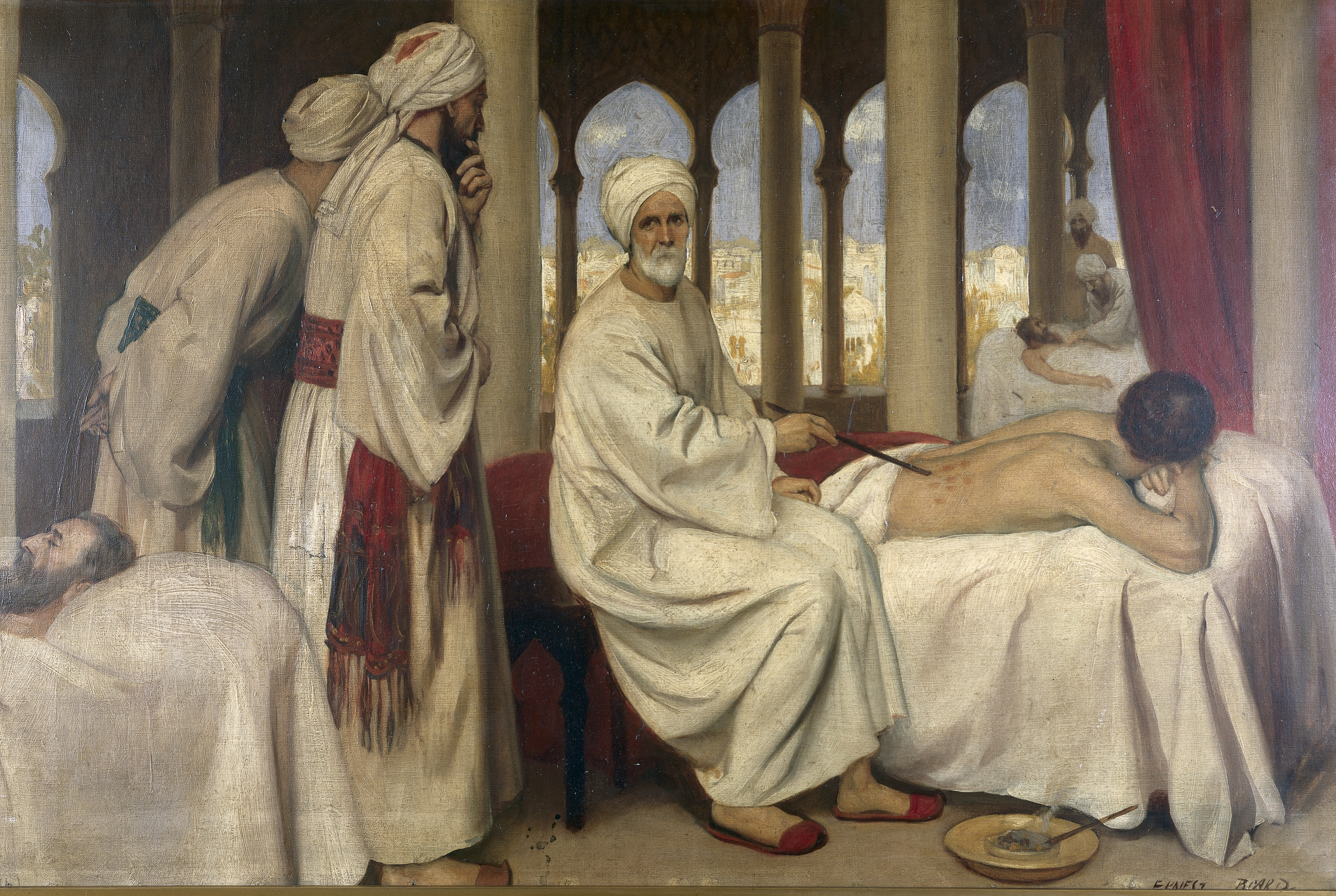
The Andalusian physician Abu'l Qasim Al-Zahrawi, who performed the first modern surgery, determined how to remove kidney stones, was known as the father of surgery, and developed many inventions and instruments.

There were many notable surgeons, physicians, and medical scholars from al-Andalus including Ibn al-Baytar (d. 1248), Abu al-Qasim al-Zahrawi (Albucasis; d. 1013), Muhammad al-Shafrah (d. 1360), Abu Marwan 'Abd al-Malik ibn Habib (d. 853), and Abu Marwan ibn Zuhr (Avenzoar; d. 1162). And of particular note is al-Zahrawi, who is considered by many to be "probably the greatest physician in the entire history of Western Islam." Around the year 1000 C.E, he wrote a book with a title that roughly translates to The Arrangement of Medical Knowledge for One Who is Not Able to Compile a Book for Himself (Kitab al-tasrif li-man 'ajiza 'an al-ta'alif)—a comprehensive medical encyclopaedia with the goal of summarising all existing medical knowledge and eliminating the need for students and practitioners to rely on multiple medical texts. The book is renowned for its chapter on surgery which included important illustrations of surgical instruments, as well as sections "on cauterization, on incisions, venesection and wounds, and on bone-setting." For hundreds of years after its publication it was one of the most widely used medical texts for students and medical practitioners and was translated into Hebrew, Latin, and Castilian. This encyclopaedia is also significant for its inclusion of al-Zahrawi's personal experiences as a surgeon, which provided important case studies for aspiring surgeons. This distinguishes it from other strictly factual medical works of the time, most notably Ibn Sina's Canon of Medicine.

Other important medical texts include al-Baytar's Comprehensive Book on Simple Drugs and Foodstuffs—an encyclopaedia with descriptions of the medical uses of over 1400 plants and other types of medicine—and ibn Habib's Book of the Medicine of the Arabs (Kitab tibb al-'arab)—a historical summary of Arabic medicine until the 9th century. Ibn Habib's work is significant because it is one of the oldest known writings in the field of prophetic medicine, which uses hadiths to create Islamic-based medicinal guidelines. His book is also significant because it uses principles of Galenic medicine, such as humorism and the theory of four temperaments, as the basis of its medical recommendations.

The ibn Zuhr family played a very important role in the production of Andalusi medical knowledge, as they produced five generations of medical experts, particularly in the fields of dietary sciences and medicaments. Abu Marwan ibn Zuhr (d. 1162) is particularly notable, as he wrote the Book of Moderation (Kitab al-Iqtisad)—a treatise on general therapy; the Book of Foods (Kitab al-Aghdhiya)—a manual on foods and regimen which contains guidelines for a healthy life; and the Kitab al-Taysir—a book written to act as a compendium to Ibn Rushd's Colliget. In Kitab al-Taysir he provides one of the earliest clinical descriptions of the scabies mite.

The Maristan of Granada was founded in 1367 by the Nasrid ruler Muhammad V of Granada and stands as one of the clearest examples of institutional medicine in late al-Andalus. Established as a charitable hospital in the Islamic tradition, it provided care for the sick, including those suffering from mental illness, and was funded through religious endowment. Contemporary sources describe it as a purpose-built structure organised around a central courtyard with water features, reflecting both hygienic and therapeutic concerns. The maristan illustrates the integration of medical practice, urban planning, and social welfare in Nasrid Granada, continuing the broader Andalusi engagement with the classical medical heritage of figures such as Ibn Sina while adapting it to local needs. The maristam has reopened in recent years as a museum for visitors.

=== Astronomy ===
Three of the most notable Andalusi astronomers were Ibn Tufail (d. 1185), Ibn Rushd (Averroes; d. 1198), and Nur ad-Din al-Bitruji (Alpetragius; d. 1204). All lived around the same time and focused their astronomical works on critiquing and revising Ptolemaic astronomy and the problem of the equant in his astronomical model. Instead, they accepted Aristotle's model and promoted the theory of homocentric spheres.

Al-Bitruji is believed to have studied under Ibn Tufail and Bitruji's Book on Cosmology (Kitab fi al-hay'a) built on Ibn Tufail's work, as well as that of Ibn Rushd, Ibn Bajja, and Maimonides. The book's goal was "to overcome the physical difficulties inherent in the geometrical models of Ptolemy's Almagest and to describe the cosmos in agreement with Aristotelian or Neoplatonic physics," which it succeeded in doing to an extent. Bitruji's book set a precedent of criticising the Almagest in future works in the field of astronomy.

Although Ibn Rushd originally trained and practiced as a jurist, he was exposed to astronomy—possibly through Ibn Tufail—and became a renowned scientist in the field. His most popular work was his Summary of the Almagest, but he also published shorter works discussing Aristotle's planetary theories. Ibn Rushd published writings on philosophy, theology, and medicine throughout his life too, including commentaries on the works of Ibn Sina.

In addition to writing the important Book of the Medicine of the Arabs, Ibn Habib also wrote the Book on Stars (Kirab fi l-nujim). This book included important "teachings on the lunar mansions, the signs of the zodiac, [and] the division of the seasons." In these teachings, Ibn-Habib calculated the phases of the moon and dates of the annual solstices and equinoxes with relative accuracy.

Another important astronomer from al-Andalus was Maslama al-Majriti (d. 1007), who played a role in translating and writing about Ptolemy's Planisphaerium and Almagest. He built on the work of older astronomers, like Muhammad ibn Musa al-Khwarizmi, whose astronomical tables he wrote a discussion on and subsequently improved.

Abu Ishaq Ibrahim al-Zarqali (d. 1087) had many influential astronomical successes, as shown by Copernicus's recognition of him in his On the Revolutions of the Heavenly Spheres five centuries later. Along with other astronomers, he undertook extensive work to edit the Toledan Zij astronomical tables. He also accurately calculated the motion of the solar apogee to be 12.04 seconds per year, which is relatively close to today's calculation of 11.8 seconds per year.

=== Agronomy ===
Other important scientific advances in al-Andalus occurred in the field of agronomy. These advances were in part facilitated by technological innovations in irrigation systems. State organised, large-scale irrigation projects provided water to city baths, mosques, gardens, residential homes, and governing palaces, such as the al-Hambra and its gardens in Granada. Collective, peasant-built irrigation infrastructure also played an important role, especially in agriculture. Many of these irrigation techniques, especially those utilised by peasants, were brought to al-Andalus by migrating Berber and Arab tribes. Although some irrigation projects built on existing Roman infrastructure, most of al-Andalus's irrigation systems were new projects built separate from old Roman aqueducts. However, there is some debate about this among scholars.

One notable agriculturalist was Ibn al-'Awwam, who wrote the Book of Agriculture. This book contains 34 chapters about various aspects of agriculture and animal husbandry, including discussions of over 580 different types of plants and how to treat plant diseases.

Other agronomic innovations in al-Andalus include the cultivation of the pomegranate from Syria, which has since become the namesake and ubiquitous symbol of the city of Granada, as well as the first attempt to create a botanical garden near Córdoba by 'Abd al-Rahman I.

== Culture ==
=== Society ===
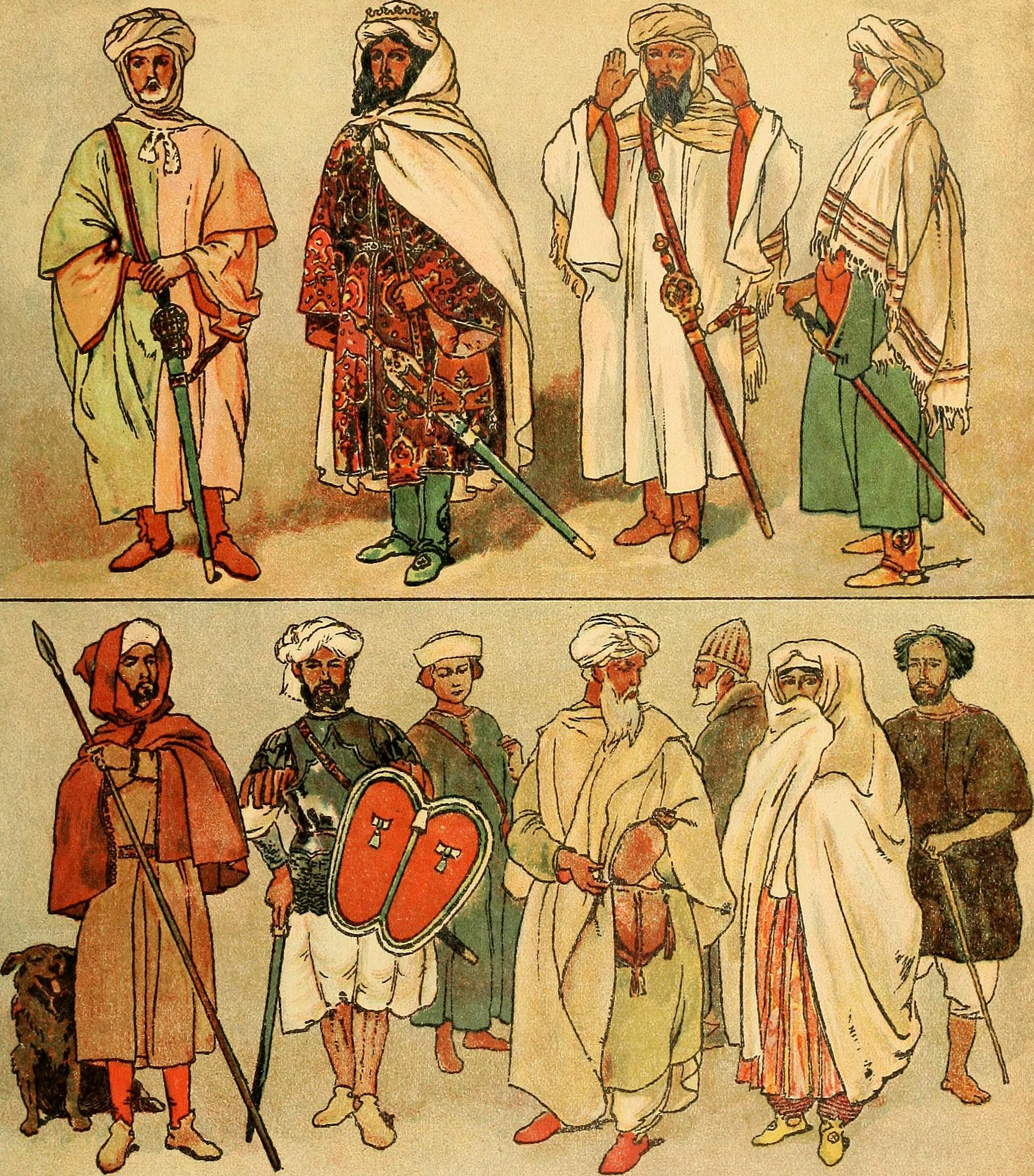
Clothing of al-Andalus in the 15th century, during the Emirate of Granada

The society of al-Andalus was made up of three main religious groups: Muslims, Christians, and Jews. The Muslims, although united on the religious level, had several ethnic divisions, the main being the distinction between the Arabs and the Berbers. The Arab elite regarded non-Arab Muslims as second-class citizens; and they were particularly scornful of the Berbers.

The ethnic structure of al-Andalus consisted of Arabs at the top of the social scale followed by, in descending order, Berbers, Muladies, Mozarabes, and Jews. Each of these communities inhabited distinct neighbourhoods in the cities. In the 10th century a massive conversion of Christians took place, and muladies formed the majority of Muslims. The Muwalladun had spoken in the local Romance dialects of Latin collectively called Andalusi Romance or Mozarabic while increasingly adopting the Arabic language, which eventually evolved into the Andalusi Arabic in which Muslims, Jews, and Christians became monolingual in the last surviving Muslim state in the Iberian Peninsula, the Emirate of Granada (1230–1492). Thomas Glick claims that Muladies, together with other Muslims, comprised eighty per cent of the population of al-Andalus by 1100.

By the 13th century, however, the Andalusi population had largely assimilated to Arab culture and to a common "Andalusi" identity. Andalusi scholars emphasised the supposed eastern Arab lineage of the Andalusi population along with the (real or imagined) eastern Arab elements that served as the basis of Andalusi culture.

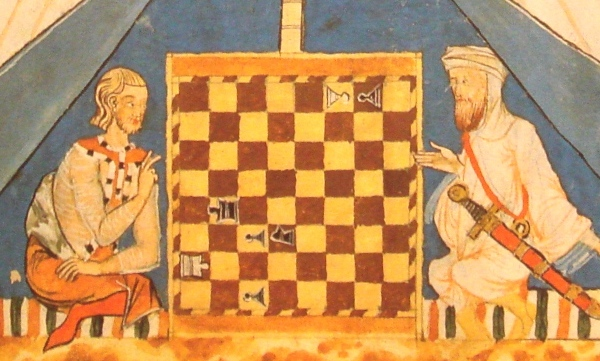
A Christian and a Muslim play chess in 13th-century al-Andalus.

Non-Muslims were given the status of ahl al-dhimma (people under protection), with adult men paying a "Jizya" tax equal to one dinar per year with exemptions for the elderly and the disabled. Those who were neither Christians nor Jews, such as pagans, were given the status of Majus. The treatment of non-Muslims in the Caliphate has been a subject of considerable debate among scholars and commentators, especially those interested in drawing parallels to the co-existence of Muslims and non-Muslims in the modern world.

Mozarabs were Christians who had long lived under Muslim and Arab rule, adopting many Arab customs, art and architecture, and words, while still maintaining their Christian and Latin rituals and their own Romance languages.

Jews constituted more than five per cent of the population. Al-Andalus was a key centre of Jewish life during the early Middle Ages, produced important scholars and was one of the most stable and wealthy Jewish communities. The Jewish population worked mainly as tax collectors, in trade, or as doctors or ambassadors. At the end of the 15th century there were about 50,000 Jews in Granada and roughly 100,000 in the whole of Islamic Iberia, which had been reduced to the territory of the Emirate of Granada.

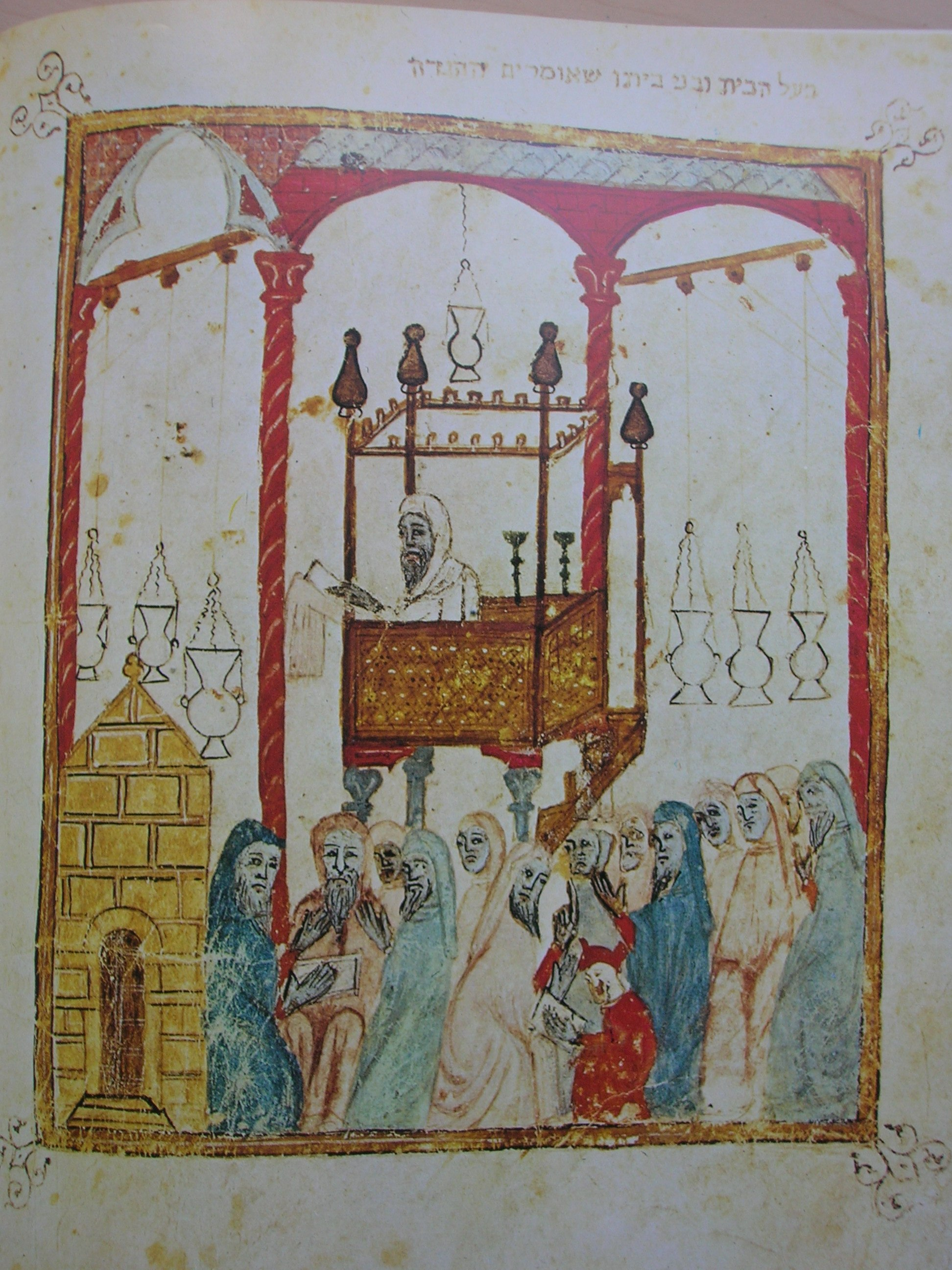
Image of a Jewish cantor reading the Passover story in al-Andalus, from a 14th-century Spanish Haggadah

The longest period of relative tolerance began after 912, with the reign of Abd-ar-Rahman III and his son, Al-Hakam II, and the Jews of al-Andalus prospered by devoting themselves to the service of the Caliphate of Córdoba, the study of the sciences, and to commerce and industry, especially by trading in silk and slaves, which thus promoted the prosperity of the country. Southern Iberia became an asylum for the oppressed Jews of other countries.

Under the Almoravids and the Almohads, there may have been intermittent persecution of Jews, but sources are extremely scarce and do not give a clear picture though the situation appears to have deteriorated after 1160. Muslim pogroms against Jews in al-Andalus occurred in Córdoba (1011) and in Granada (1066). However, massacres of dhimmis are believed to be rare in Islamic history.

The Almohads, who had taken control of the Almoravids' Maghribi and Andalusi territories by 1147, far surpassed the Almoravides in fundamentalist outlook, and treated the non-Muslims harshly. Faced with the choice of either death or conversion, many Jews and Christians emigrated. Some, such as the family of Maimonides, fled east to more tolerant Muslim lands.

Many ethnicities and religions co-existed in al-Andalus, each of which contributed to its intellectual prosperity. Literacy in Islamic Iberia was far more widespread than in many other nations in the West of the time.

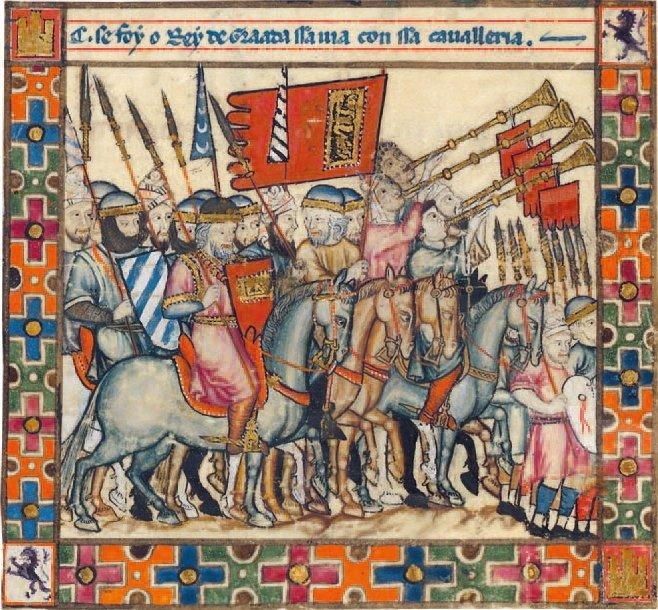
Depiction of the Moors in Iberia, from The Cantigas de Santa Maria

Though the number of the early inhabitants of al-Andalus after the 7th-century conquest was small, many native Iberian inhabitants converted to Islam, known as Muwalladun in Arabic or Muladíes in Spanish. By 1000, according to Ronald Segal, some 5,000,000 of Iberia's 7,000,000 inhabitants, most of them descended from indigenous Iberian converts, were Muslim. There were also Sub-Saharan Africans who had been absorbed into al-Andalus to be used as soldiers and slaves. The Berber and the sub-Saharan African soldiers were known as "tangerines" because they were imported through the Mediterranean coastal city of Tangier.

In the 11th century, the Hindu-Arabic numeral system (base 10) had reached Europe via al-Andalus through Spanish Muslims, together with knowledge of astronomy and instruments like the astrolabe, which was first imported by Gerbert of Aurillac. For that reason, the numerals came to be known in Europe as Arabic numerals despite their origins in India.

From the earliest days, the Umayyads wanted to be seen as intellectual rivals to the Abbasids and for Córdoba to have libraries and educational institutions to that of their rival, Baghdad. Although there was a clear rivalry between the two powers, there was freedom to travel between the two caliphates, which helped spread new ideas and innovations over time.

=== Language ===
Multilingualism, language contact, and code-switching were important features of the shifting linguistic landscape in al-Andalus, which included Arabic, in vernacular Andalusi Arabic and formal Classical Arabic registers, vernacular Andalusi Romance and formal Latin, Hebrew, and al-lisān al-gharbī or Berber. Multilingual households were an attested phenomenon.

Initially, most of the population spoke Romance dialects. The dialects of Iberian Romance that were spoken in al-Andalus are collectively referred to as Andalusi Romance or Mozarabic. What is hypothesised about Romance dialects in al-Andalus is based on sparse evidence, including Romance topographical and personal names and the kharjas of some muwaššaḥ poetry.

Arabic arrived with the Umayyad conquest of Hispania in 711 and spread gradually among the inhabitants of Iberia over the following centuries, primarily through conversion to Islam. Arabic in al-Andalus became the language of administration and of literature and a "vehicle for a higher culture, a literate and literary civilization." It was widely adopted by the end of the 9th century, even among Andalusi Christians and Jews, who wrote Arabic in Hebrew letters but did not have a distinct dialect. The vernacular varieties of Arabic spoken in al-Andalus, referred to as Andalusi Arabic, were Maghrebi Arabic dialects influenced by their contact with Romance, just as Arabic influenced Spanish. By about 1260, following the Almohad period, most Christians had migrated to the north and Muslim territories in Iberia were reduced to the Emirate of Granada, in which more than 90% of the population had converted to Islam and Arabic-Romance bilingualism seems to have largely disappeared.

The literary traditions of Hebrew—which was used for prayer and ceremonial writings, but not for oral communication—experienced a revolution through contact with Arabic and its literary traditions. Consuelo López Morillas writes that Jews in al-Andalus "wrote Hebrew poetry using Arabic prosodic models and adopted nearly the entire range of Arabic poetic genres and stylistic devices in Hebrew," looking to Biblical Hebrew as a source for literary expression as Muslims looked to Quranic Arabic.

Berber languages, referred to in contemporary sources as al-lisān al-gharbī (اللسان الغربي, Arabic for 'the western tongue'), were especially present in periods of Berber rule, particularly under the Almoravids and Almohads. Under Almohad rule, it was compulsory to deliver the khuṭba (sermon) at Friday prayer in Arabic and al-lisān al-gharbī.

=== Literature and poetry ===
In al-Andalus, there are 11,831 known scholars who were active and 13,730 known works that were written or transmitted from the eighth to fifteenth centuries. Of these scholars, those who are well known and remembered in the West, such as Ibn Rushd, Ibn Hazm, or Ibn Arabi, are not necessarily the same scholars that are remembered in Islamic culture, such as Abū ʿUmar b. ʿAbd al-Barr, Abū l-Walīd al-Bājī, Ibn ʿAtịyya, Ibn al-ʿArīf, or Abū Isḥāq aš-Šāṭibī.

Poetry was considered the prime literary genre in Arabic. Traditional forms of Arabic poetry from the Mashriq, or Muslim East, especially the monometer, monorhyme qaṣīda and the prosimetric maqāma, were adopted in al-Andalus. The major Andalusi innovation in poetry was the 'rhyme revolution' embodied in the 10th-11th century strophic song form called the muwaššaḥ ('girdled'; pl. muwaššaḥāt). The muwaššaḥ features a complex rhyme scheme usually containing five aghsān ('branches'; sing. ghusn), with uniform rhyme within each strophe, interspersed with asmāṭ ('threads for stringing pearls'; sing. simṭ) with common rhyme throughout the song, as well as a terminal kharja, the song's final simṭ, which could be in a different language. Andalusi zajal was strophic poetry in Andalusi vernacular Arabic, usually associated with Ibn Quzman. Andalusi strophic poetry had an impact on poetic expression in Western Europe, especially the Old Occitan/Provençal lyric of the troubadours, and in the wider Muslim world.

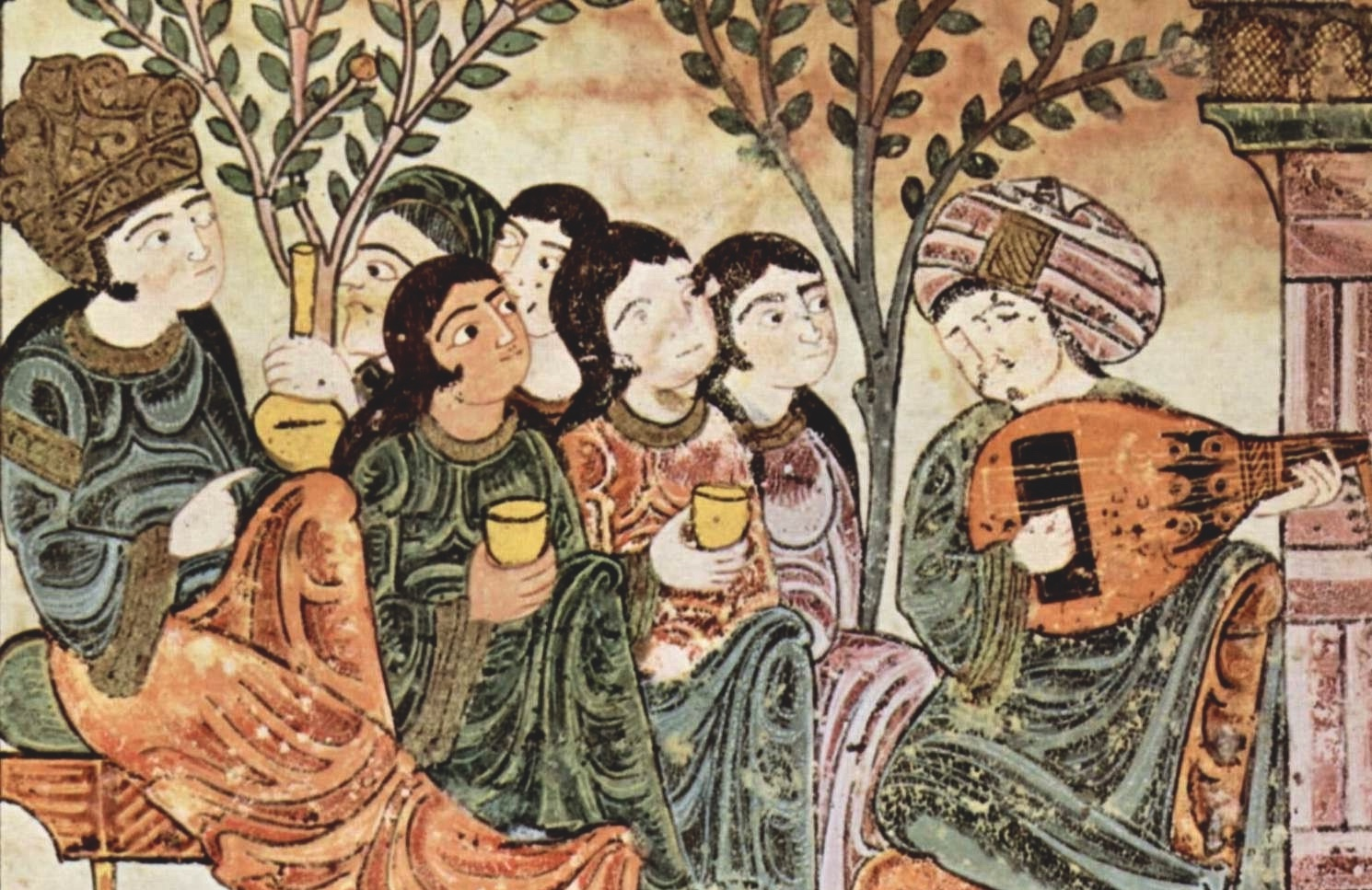
Lute song in a garden for a noble lady. 13th century manuscript from Andalusi Hadith Bayad wa Riyad.

Rithā' al-Andalus is considered the most significant of a series of poems that were written in the classical tradition of rithā' (which denotes both lamentation and a literary genre in itself) by Andalusi poets who had taken inspiration from the fall of Andalusi cities and territories. Jewish poetry from Al-Andalus also developed, mostly but not exclusively in Hebrew, with significant consonance with Arabic poetry in both theme and form.

One specialist of al-Andalus' intellectual history, Maria Luisa Avila, says that "biographical dictionaries have recorded information about thousands of distinguished people in every period from al-Andalus, who were “cultivators of knowledge”, particularly in the legal-religious sciences as well as authors", and that "the exact number of scholars which appears in the biographical sources has not been established yet, but it surely exceeds six thousand." It has been estimated that in the 10th century between 70,000 and 80,000 manuscripts were copied on a yearly basis in Córdoba alone.

=== Music ===
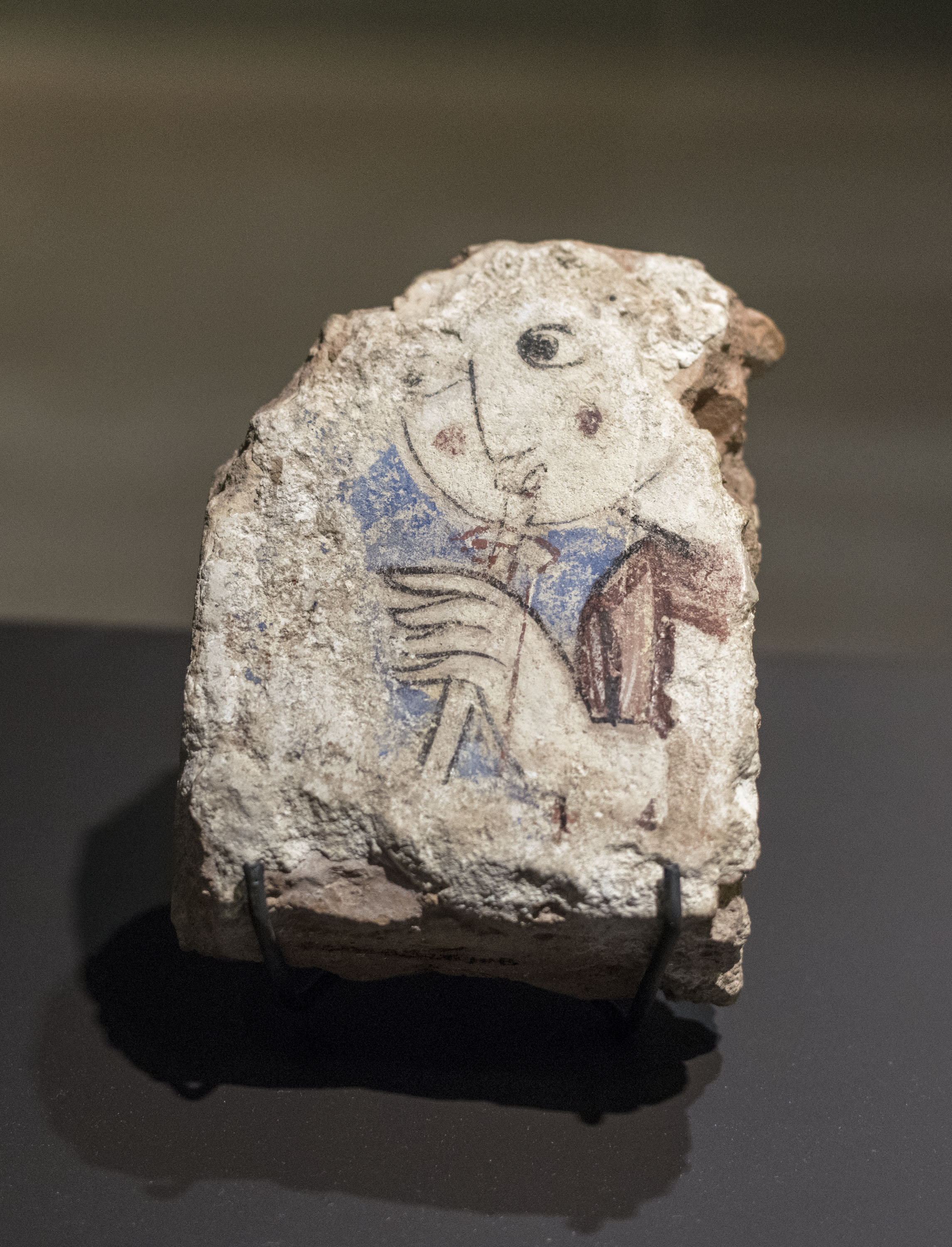
Fragment of the dome of the palace of ibn Mardanīsh in Murcia displaying a female figure playing a wind instrument, the mizmar.

The music of al-Andalus is part of an influential musical tradition. Ziryab, a poet and musician, who came from the Abbasid Caliphate and arrived in Córdoba in 822, played a role in Andalusi music as well as other aspects of Andalusi culture. Poetic forms such as the muwashshah and its kharja, the nawba, and the zajal are prominent in Andalusi music.

=== Philosophy ===
==== Al-Andalus philosophy ====
The historian Said al-Andalus wrote that Caliph Abd-ar-Rahman III had collected libraries of books and granted patronage to scholars of medicine and "ancient sciences". Later, al-Mustansir (Al-Hakam II) went yet further, building a university and libraries in Córdoba. Córdoba became one of the world's leading centres of medicine and philosophical debate.

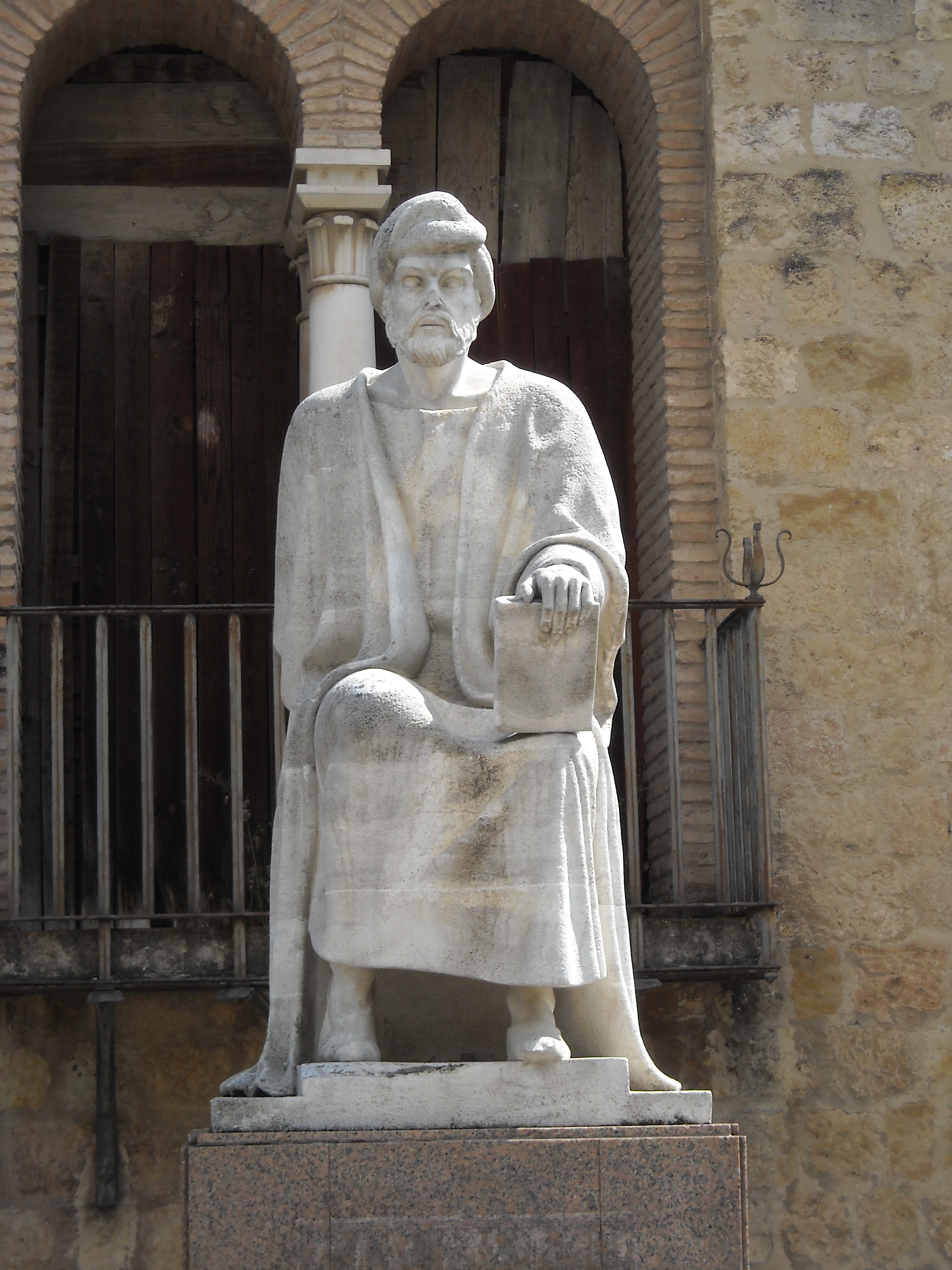
Averroes, founder of the Averroism school of philosophy, was influential in the rise of secular thought in Western Europe. Statue of Averroes in Córdoba.

When Al-Hakam's son Hisham II took over, real power was ceded to the hajib, al-Mansur Ibn Abi Aamir. Al-Mansur was a distinctly religious man and disapproved of the sciences of astronomy, logic, and especially of astrology, so much so that many books on these subjects, which had been preserved and collected at great expense by Al-Hakam II, were burned publicly. With Al-Mansur's death in 1002, interest in philosophy revived. Numerous scholars emerged, including Abu Uthman Ibn Fathun, whose masterwork was the philosophical treatise "Tree of Wisdom". Maslamah Ibn Ahmad al-Majriti (died 1008) was an outstanding scholar in astronomy and astrology; he was an intrepid traveller who journeyed all over the Islamic world and beyond and kept in touch with the Brethren of Purity. He is said to have brought the 51 "Epistles of the Brethren of Purity" to al-Andalus and added the compendium to this work, although it is quite possible that it was added later by another scholar with the name al-Majriti. Another book attributed to al-Majriti is the Ghayat al-Hakim, "The Aim of the Sage", which explored a synthesis of Platonism with Hermetic philosophy. Its use of incantations led the book to be widely dismissed in later years, although the Sufi communities continued to study it.

A prominent follower of al-Majriti was the philosopher and geometer Abu al-Hakam al-Kirmani who was followed, in turn, by Abu Bakr Ibn al-Sayigh, usually known in the Arab world as Ibn Bajjah, or "Avempace."

The al-Andalus philosopher Averroes (1126–1198) was the founder of the Averroism school of philosophy, and his works and commentaries influenced medieval thought in Western Europe. Another influential al-Andalus philosopher was Ibn Tufail.

==== Jewish philosophy and culture ====
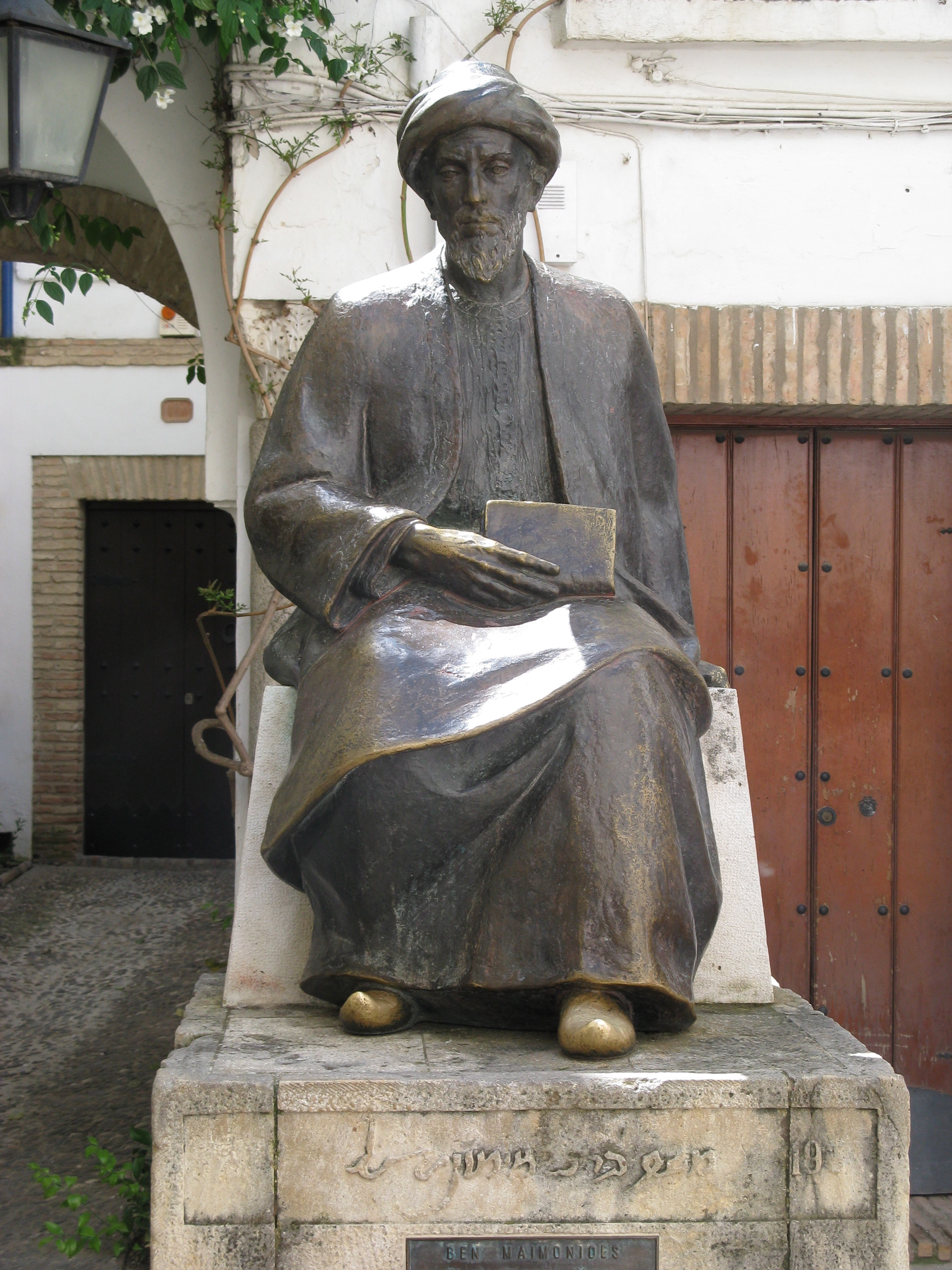
Memorial to Maimonides in Córdoba

As Jewish thought in Babylonia declined, the tolerance of al-Andalus made it the new centre of Jewish intellectual endeavours. Poets and commentators like Judah Halevi (1086–1145) and Dunash ben Labrat (920–990) contributed to the cultural life of al-Andalus, but the area was even more important to the development of Jewish philosophy. A stream of Jewish philosophers, cross-fertilising with Muslim philosophers (see joint Jewish and Islamic philosophies), culminated with the widely celebrated Jewish thinker of the Middle Ages, Maimonides (1135–1205), though he did not actually do any of his work in al-Andalus, his family having fled persecution by the Almohads around 1159.

In al-Andalus, Sephardic Jewish communities played significant roles within the medical sphere, and many Sephardic Jews achieved prominence as physicians. Hasdai ibn Shaprut, a Jewish court official and physician in 10th-century Córdoba, was involved in the Arabic translation of Dioscorides's Materia Medica, collaborating with both Christian and Muslim scholars. In 11th-century Zaragoza, Jonah ibn Janah authored a pharmacological treatise that provided multilingual drug names and detailed discussions of weights and measures used in medicine. His contemporary, Jonah ibn Biklārish, compiled a medical dictionary for Zaragoza's rulers, presenting materia medica in tabular form across several languages, including Syriac, Persian, Greek, Latin, and Spanish. According to historian Y. Tzvi Langermann, Andalusian medicine evolved distinctive characteristics, and, by the 11th century, increasingly shifted away from eastern Islamic models in favour of closer ties with North African traditions. The influence of Andalusian medicine is evident in such later Jewish figures as Maimonides (1135–1204), whose teachers were trained in this tradition and who himself adopted its emphasis on holistic, Galenic approaches to care.

=== Art and architecture ===
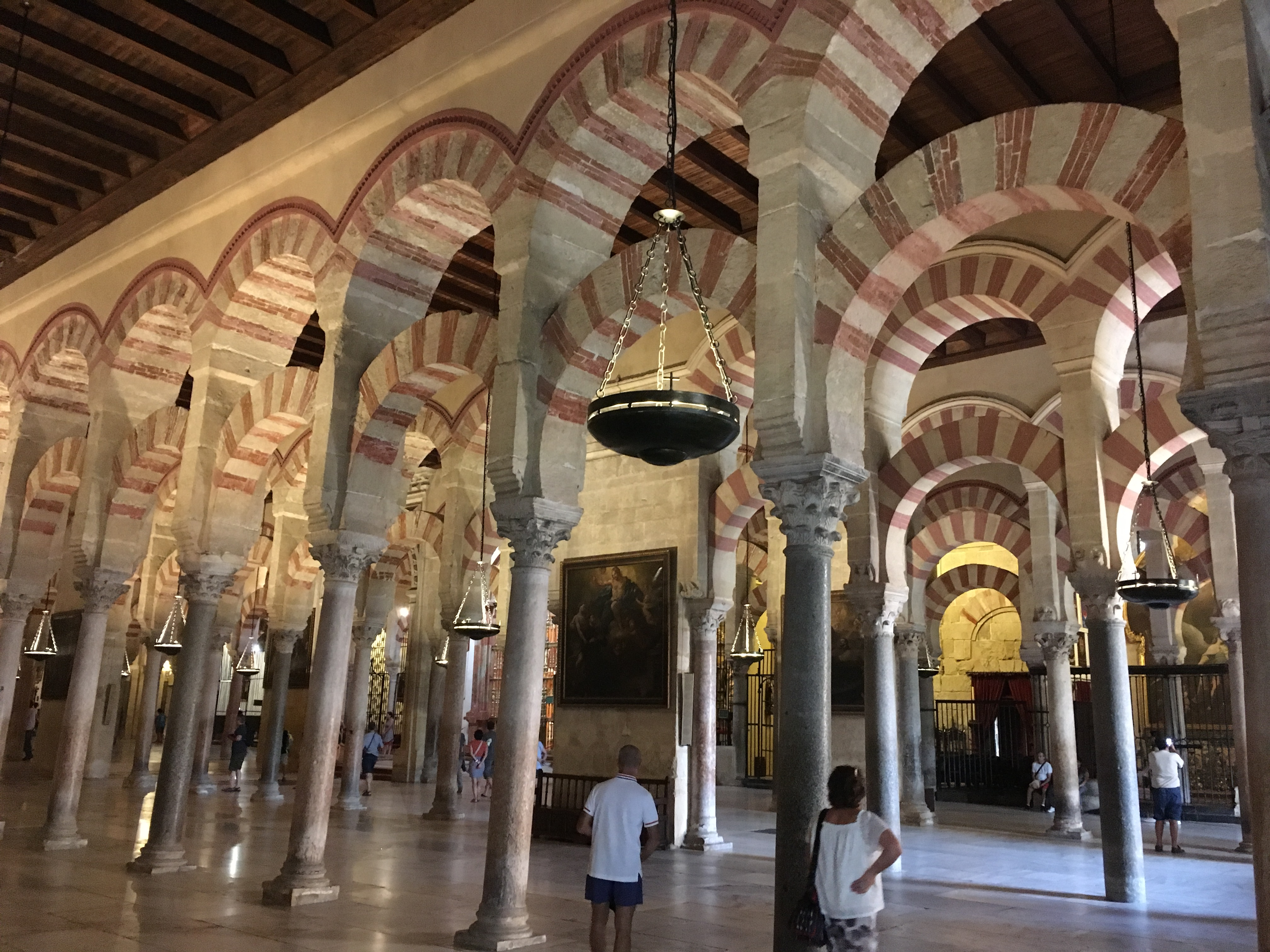
A section of the hypostyle hall in the Mosque–Cathedral of Córdoba, begun in 785

In Córdoba, Abd ar-Rahman I built the Great Mosque of Córdoba in 785. It was expanded multiple times up until the 10th century, and after the Reconquista it was converted into a Catholic cathedral. Its key features include a hypostyle hall with marble columns supporting two-tiered arches, a horseshoe-arch mihrab, ribbed domes, a courtyard (sahn) with gardens, and a minaret (later converted into a bell tower). Abd ar-Rahman III, at the height of his power, began construction of Madinat al-Zahra, a luxurious palace-city to serve as a new capital. The Umayyads also reconstructed the Roman-era bridge over the Guadalquivir River in Córdoba, while the Almohads later added the Calahorra Tower to the bridge. The Bab al-Mardum Mosque (later converted to a church) in Toledo is a well-preserved example of a small neighbourhood mosque built at the end of the Caliphate period.

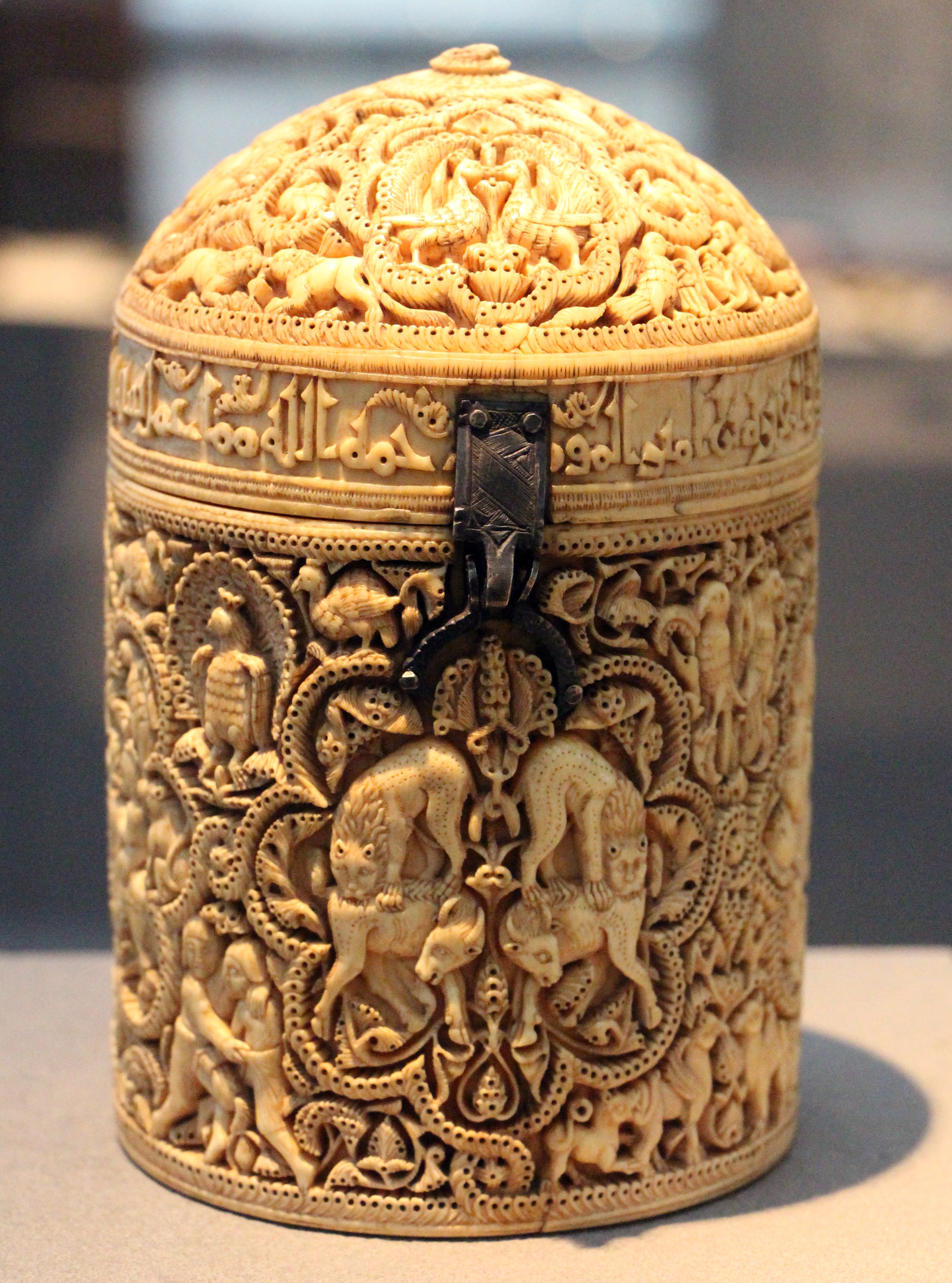
The Pyxis of al-Mughira, a carved ivory casket made at Madinat al-Zahra, dated to 968

The official workshops of the Caliphate, such as those at Madinat al-Zahra, produced luxury goods for use at court or as gifts for guests, allies, and diplomats, which stimulated artistic production. Many objects produced in the caliph's workshops later made their way into the collections of museums and Christian cathedrals in Europe. Among the most famous objects of this period are ivory boxes which are carved with vegetal, figurative, and epigraphic motifs. Notable surviving examples include the Pyxis of al-Mughira, the Pyxis of Zamora, and the Leyre Casket.

During the Taifas period, art and culture continued to flourish despite the political fragmentation of al-Andalus. The Aljaferia Palace of Zaragoza is the most significant palace preserved from this period, featuring complex ornamental arcades and stucco decoration. In other cities, a number of important palaces or fortresses were begun or expanded by local dynasties such as the Alcazaba of Málaga and the Alcazaba of Almería. Other examples of architecture from around this period include the Bañuelo of Granada, an Islamic bathhouse.

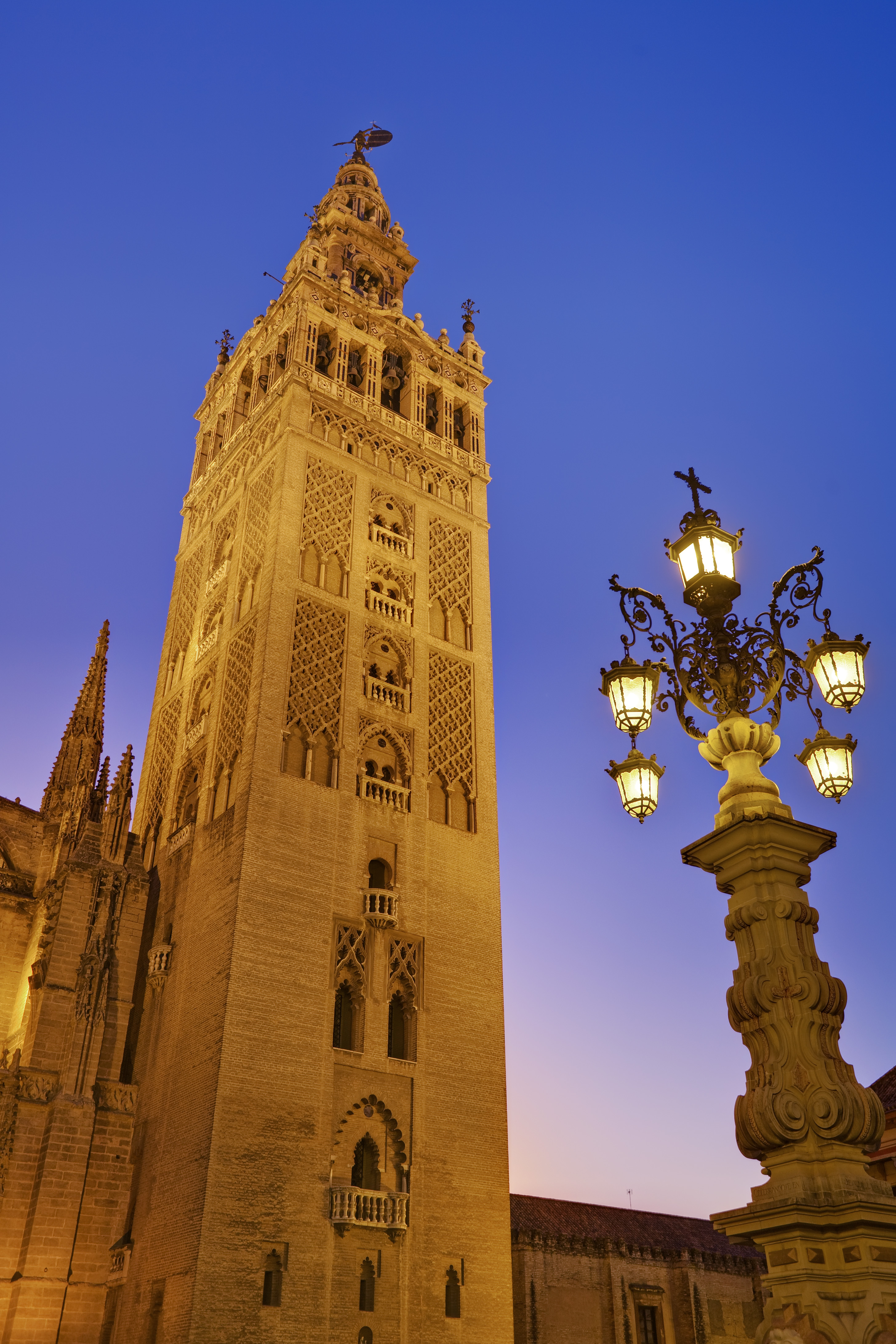
The Giralda of Seville, originally built by the Almohads, is a prime example of Andalusi architecture.

In Seville, Almohad rulers built the Great Mosque of Seville (later transformed into the Cathedral of Seville), which consisted of a hypostyle prayer hall, a courtyard (now known as the Patio de los Naranjos or Court of Oranges), and a massive minaret tower now known as the Giralda. The minaret was later expanded after being converted into a bell tower for the current cathedral. Almohad architecture promoted new forms and decorative designs such as the multifoil arch and the sebka motif, probably influenced by the Caliphate-period architecture of Córdoba.

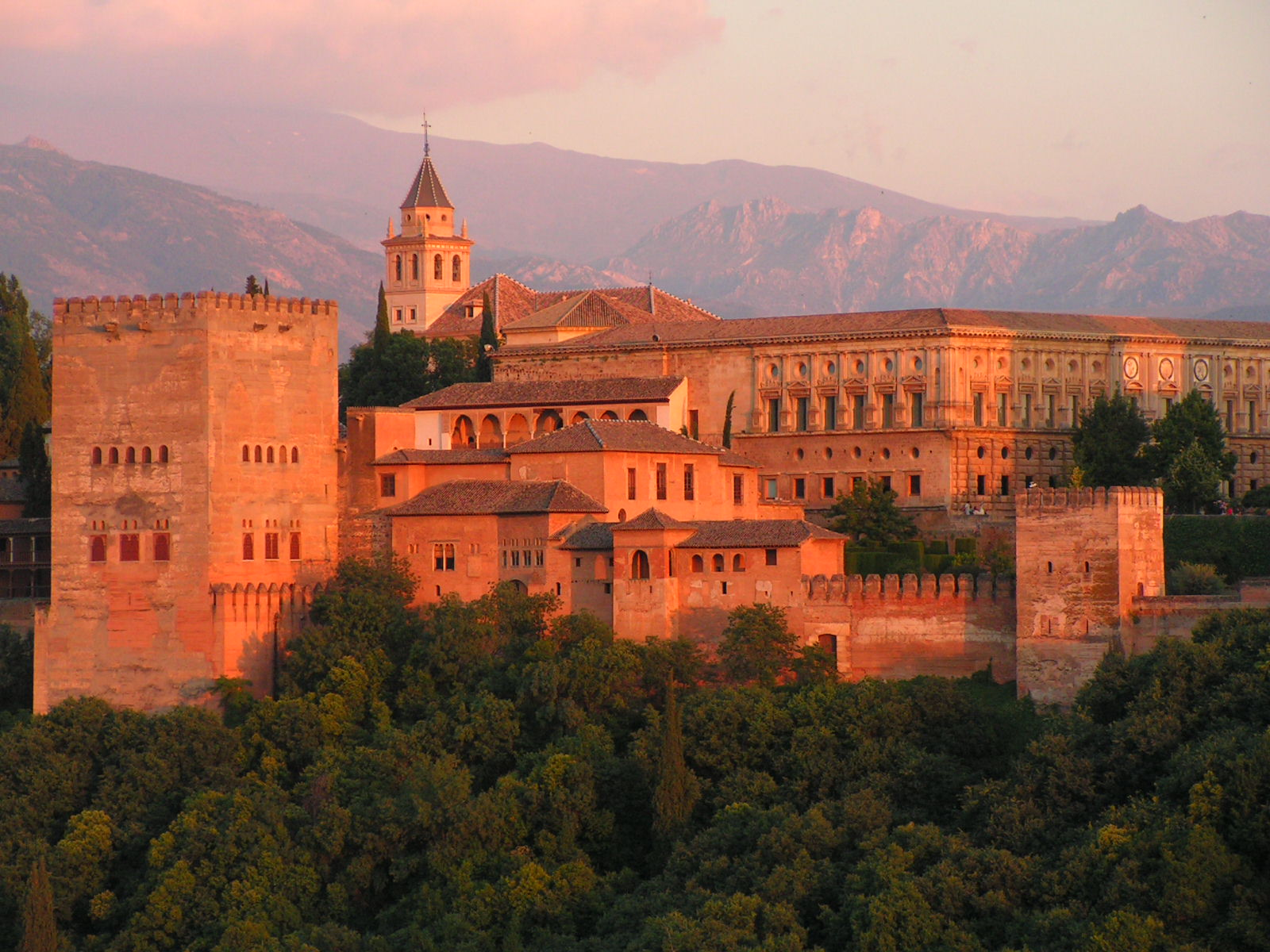
The Alhambra, begun by the first Nasrid emir Ibn al-Ahmar in the 13th century

Artists and intellectuals took refuge at Granada after the Christian kingdoms expanded significantly in the 13th century. In Granada, the palaces of the Alhambra and the Generalife in reflect the culture and art of the last few centuries of Muslim rule of al-Andalus. The complex was begun by Ibn al-Ahmar, the first Nasrid emir, and the last major additions were made during the reigns of Yusuf I (1333–1353) and Muhammad V (1353–1391). It integrates buildings and gardens with the natural qualities of the site and is a testament to Andalusi culture and to the skills of the Muslim artisans, craftsmen, and builders of their era. Nasrid architecture continued the earlier traditions of Andalusi architecture while also synthesising them into its own distinctive style, which had many similarities with contemporary Marinid architecture in North Africa. It is characterised by the use of the courtyard as a central space and basic unit around which other halls and rooms were organised. Courtyards typically had water features at their centre, such as a reflective pool or a fountain. Decoration was focused on the inside of buildings and was executed primarily with tile mosaics on lower walls and carved stucco on the upper walls. Geometric patterns, vegetal motifs, and calligraphy were the main types of decorative motifs. Additionally, "stalactite"-like sculpting, known as muqarnas, was used for three-dimensional features like vaulted ceilings, particularly during the reign of Muhammad V and after.

Even after Muslim territories were conquered by the Christian kingdoms, Andalusi art and architecture continued to appear for many centuries as a prestigious style under new Christian patrons employing Muslim craftsmen, originating the Mozarabic art in the Kingdom of Leon during the 10th century and becoming what is known as the Mudéjar style (named after the Mudéjars or Muslims under Christian rule). Numerous examples are found in the early churches of Toledo (e.g. the Church of San Román, 13th century) and in the cities of Aragon such as Zaragoza and Teruel. Among the most famous examples is the Alcázar of Seville, the former Abbadid and Almohad palace redeveloped by Christian rulers such as Peter of Castile, who in 1364 started adding new Moorish-style sections with the help of Muslim craftsmen from Granada and Toledo. Some surviving 13th and 14th-century Jewish synagogues were also built (or rebuilt) in Mudéjar style under Christian rule, such as the Synagogue of Santa Maria la Blanca in Toledo (rebuilt in its current form circa 1250), the Synagogue of Córdoba (1315), and the Synagogue of El Tránsito (1355–1357).

=== Food and agriculture ===
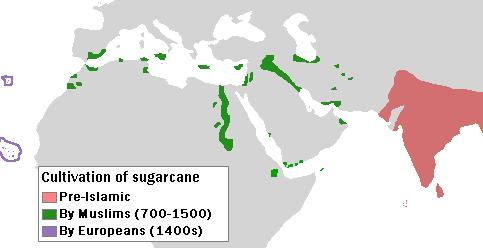
The cultivation of sugarcane had reached the south of the Iberian Peninsula by the 16th century AD due to Arab conquest and administration of the region.

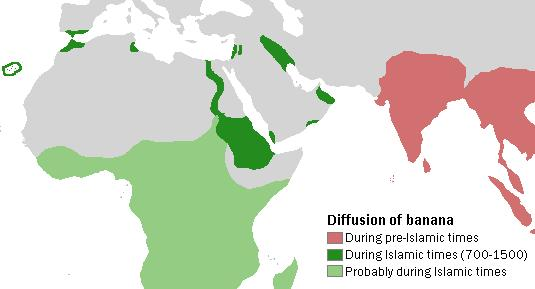
Diffusion of bananas from India to the Iberian peninsula during Islamic rule

Crops produced using irrigation, along with food imported from the Middle East, provided areas around Andalusī cities with an agricultural economic sector that was the most advanced in Europe by far, sparking the Arab Agricultural Revolution. A variety of foodstuffs, spices and crops were introduced to Spain and Sicily during Arab rule, via the commercial networks of the Islamic world. These include sugarcane, rice, cotton, alfalfa, oranges, lemons, apricots, spinach, eggplants, carrots, saffron and bananas. The Arabs also continued extensive cultivation and production of olive oil (the Spanish words for 'oil' and 'olive'—aceite and aceituna, respectively—are derived from the Arabic al-zait, meaning 'olive juice'), and pomegranates (the heraldic symbol of Granada) from classical Greco-Roman times.

Arab influence still lingers on in Spanish cuisine through these fruits, vegetables, spices, and cooking and agricultural techniques. One of the largest palm groves in the world, called the Palmeral of Elche, was established by the Arabs between the 7th–10th centuries to facilitate fruit (including pomegranate and date crops) and vegetable growth underneath the cool shade of palm trees and irrigation channels, and is cited by UNESCO as an example of the transfer of agricultural practices from one continent (North Africa) to another (Iberian Peninsula of Europe).

The period of Arab rule also involved the extension of Roman irrigation channels as well as the introduction of novel irrigation techniques from the Persianate world, such as the acequia (deriving from the classical Arabic as-sāqiya) – subterranean channels used to transport water from highland aquifers to lowland fields in arid environments –first originating in either the Arabian Peninsula or the Persian Empire (referred to as qanat or karez in the Middle East). These structures are still found in Andalusia province, particularly in Granada.

The confection alfajor (supposedly from الفاخر) has its origins in al-Andalus.

=== Homosexuality and pederasty ===
The Encyclopedia of Homosexuality states that "Al-Andalus had many links to Hellenistic culture, and except for the Almoravid and Almohadic periods (1086–1212), it was hedonistic and tolerant of homosexuality, indeed one of the times in world history in which sensuality of all sorts has been most openly enjoyed. Important rulers such as Abd al-Rahman III, al-Hakam II, Hisham II, and al-Mu-tamid openly chose boys as sexual partners, and kept catamites. Homosexual prostitution was widespread, and its customers came from higher levels of society than those of heterosexual prostitutes." The verses of Ibn Quzman describe an openly bisexual lifestyle. Andalusi anthologies of poetry such as the Rāyāt al-mubarrizīn wa-ghāyāt al-mumayyazīn are known in part for their homoerotic and "abundant pederastic poetry". Such themes were also found in the Sephardic Jewish poetry of the time.

In the book Medieval Iberia: An Encyclopedia, Daniel Eisenberg describes homosexuality as "a key symbolic issue throughout the Middle Ages in Iberia", stating that "in al-Andalus homosexual pleasures were much indulged in by the intellectual and political elite. Evidence includes the behaviour of rulers, such as Abd al-Rahmn III, Al-Hakam II, Hisham II, and Al Mu'tamid, who openly kept male harems; the memoirs of Abdallah ibn Buluggin, last Zirid king of Granada, makes references to male prostitutes, who charged higher fees and had a higher class of clientele than did their female counterparts: the repeated criticisms of Christians; and especially the abundant poetry. Both pederasty and love between adult males are found. Although homosexual practices were never officially condoned, prohibitions against them were rarely enforced, and usually there was not even a pretense of doing so." Male homosexual relations allowed non-procreative sexual practices and were not seen as a form of identity. Very little is known about the homosexual behaviour of women.

=== Slavery ===
Slavery existed in Islamic al-Andalus as well as in the Christian kingdoms, and both sides of the religious border followed the custom of not enslaving people of their own religion. Consequently, Muslims were enslaved in Christian lands, while Christians and other non-Muslims were enslaved in al-Andalus.

From the 8th century until the end of the Reconquista in the late 15th century, the Moors imported Christian slaves to al-Andalus. The slaves were exported from the Christian areas of Iberia, as well as Eastern and Northern Europe (Saqaliba). Saqaliba slavery in al-Andalus was especially prominent in the Caliphate of Córdoba, where slaves constituted most of the administrative personnel in the courts and palaces.

The slaves were often Northern and Eastern European saqaliba slaves trafficked from Christian Europe. While male saqaliba could be given work in a number of tasks, such as offices in the kitchen, falconry, mint, textile workshops, the administration or the royal guard (in the case of harem guards, they were castrated), female saqaliba were placed in the harem.

The harem could contain thousands of slave concubines; the harem of Abd al-Rahman I consisted of 6,300 women. They were appreciated for their light skin. The concubines (jawaris) were educated in accomplishments to please their master, and many became known and respected for their knowledge in a variety of subjects from music to medicine. Jawaris concubines who gave birth to a child attained the status of an umm walad, which meant that they could no longer be sold and were to be set free after the death of their master.

== Legacy ==
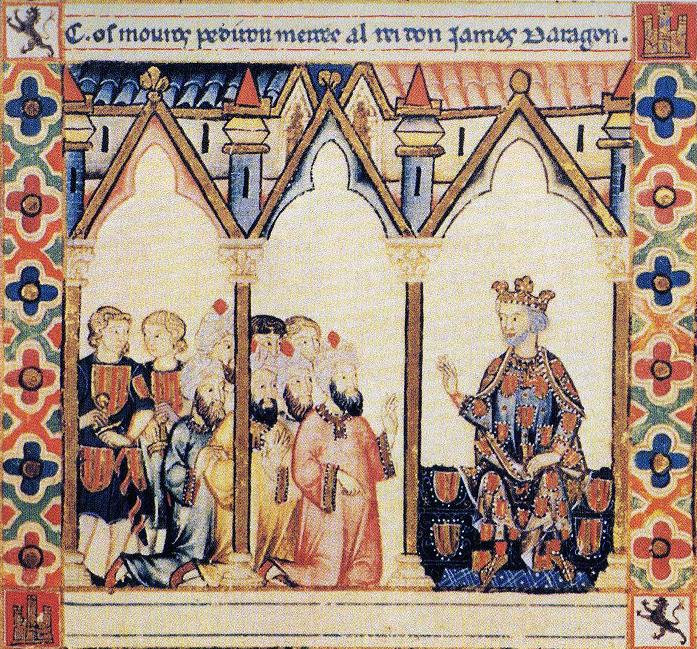
The Moors request permission from James I of Aragón, from The Cantigas de Santa Maria

As Andalusi cities were conquered by Leon, Castile, and other Christian Spanish kingdoms, Christian monarchs such as Alfonso X of Castile started translating the mountainous libraries of al-Andalus into Latin. These libraries contained translations of Ancient Greek texts, as well as new translations made by Muslims during the Islamic Golden Age. That, combined with Crusades-era interactions with Muslims and the Fall of Constantinople introducing Greek scholars to the West, helped launch the Renaissance. Such scientists and philosophers as Averroes and Al-Zahrawi (fathers of rationalism and surgery, respectively) heavily inspired the Renaissance. To this day, their ideas are still world-renowned. Al-Andalus has also left art, architecture, and its former territories are among some of the world's best preserved Islamic Golden Age architecture, with examples including the Cathedral of Córdoba, the Alhambra, the Giralda, and many more.

As a result of the Reconquista and fall of many important Andalusi cities, substantial numbers of Andalusi migrated to the Maghreb (where they found place at the courts of Maghrebi rulers). Many of the elite Andalusi immigrants were Arabs. For a variety of reasons, "Andalusi" came to be almost synonymous with "Arab" in the Maghreb.

In the Iberian Peninsula, many Muslims were forced to convert to Christianity, particularly in the latter period of the Reconquista and following the decrees of 1502 and 1526. These converts and their descendants, known as Moriscos, remained under intense persecution until their expulsion in the early 17th century. This is indicated by a "high mean proportion of ancestry from North African (10.6%)" that "attests to a high level of religious conversion (whether voluntary or enforced), driven by historical episodes of social and religious intolerance, that ultimately led to the integration of descendants." The "high mean proportion of North African ancestry (10.6%)" in modern Iberian populations attests not to voluntary integration, but primarily to the forced conversion and subsequent absorption of these populations before the expulsions, driven by centuries of social and religious intolerance.

== See also ==
- Gharb al-Andalus
- Arab diaspora
- La Convivencia
- History of Islam
- History of the Jews under Muslim rule
- Hispanic and Latino Muslims
- Islam and anti-Semitism in Iberia
- Islam in Spain
- Islam in Portugal
- List of Andalusi and Moroccan writers
- Moorish Gibraltar
- Muslim conquests
- Kemal Reis
- Social and cultural exchange in al-Andalus
- Timeline of the Muslim presence in the Iberian peninsula

== Bibliography ==
- Alfonso, Esperanza, 2007. Islamic Culture Through Jewish Eyes: al-Andalus from the Tenth to Twelfth Century. NY: Routledge. ISBN 978-0-415-43732-5
- Al-Djazairi, Salah Eddine 2005. The Hidden Debt to Islamic Civilisation. Manchester: Bayt Al-Hikma Press. ISBN 0-9551156-1-2
- Bennison, Amira K. (2016). The Almoravid and Almohad Empires. Edinburgh University Press. ISBN 9780748646821.
- Boloix-Gallardo, Bárbara (2021). "Granada, Capital of al-Andalus and Core of the Nasrid Kingdom (7th–9th/13th–15th Centuries)". In Boloix-Gallardo, Bárbara (ed.). A Companion to Islamic Granada. Brill. pp. 122–163. ISBN 978-90-04-42581-1.
- Bossong, Georg. 2002. "Der Name Al-Andalus: Neue Überlegungen zu einem alten Problem", Sounds and Systems: Studies in Structure and Change. A Festschrift for Theo Vennemann, eds. David Restle & Dietmar Zaefferer. Berlin: Mouton de Gruyter, pp. 149–164. (In German) Also available online
- Calderwood, Eric. 2018. Colonial al-Andalus : Spain and the making of modern Moroccan culture. Harvard University Press
- Catlos, Brian A. (2018). Kingdoms of Faith: A New History of Islamic Spain. New York: Basic Books. ISBN 978-0465055876.
- Cohen, Mark. 1994. Under Crescent and Cross: The Jews in the Middle Ages. Princeton, NJ: Princeton University Press. ISBN 0-691-01082-X
- Collins, Roger. 1989. The Arab Conquest of Spain, 710–797, Oxford: Blackwell. ISBN 0-631-19405-3
- Dodds, Jerrilynn D. (1992). Al-Andalus: the art of Islamic Spain. New York: The Metropolitan Museum of Art. ISBN 9780870996368.
- Ekkehard (1877). Causus sancti Galli.
- Fernandez-Morera, Dario. 2016. The Myth of the Andalusian Paradise: Muslims, Christians, and Jews under Islamic Rule in Medieval Spain. NY: Intercollegiate Studies Institute. ISBN 978-1610170956
- Frank, Daniel H. & Leaman, Oliver. 2003. The Cambridge Companion to Medieval Jewish Philosophy. Cambridge: Cambridge University Press. ISBN 0-521-65574-9
- Gerli, E. Michael, ed., 2003. Medieval Iberia: An Encyclopedia. NY: Routledge. ISBN 0-415-93918-6
- Glick, Thomas (1999). "Islamic and Christian Spain in the Early Middle Ages".
- Halm, Heinz. 1989. "Al-Andalus und Gothica Sors", 66:252–263.
- Hamilton, Michelle M., Sarah J. Portnoy, and David A. Wacks, eds. 2004. Wine, Women, and Song: Hebrew and Arabic Literature in Medieval Iberia. Newark, Del.: Juan de la Cuesta Hispanic Monographs.
- Harvey, Leonard Patrick (1990). Islamic Spain, 1250 to 1500. University of Chigaco Press. ISBN 0226319628.
- Harzig, Christiane, Dirk Hoerder, and Adrian Shubert. 2003. The Historical Practice in Diversity. Berghahn Books. ISBN 1-57181-377-2
- Jayyusi, Salma Khadra. 1992. The Legacy of Muslim Spain, 2 vols. Leiden–NY–Cologne: Brill [chief consultant to the editor, Manuela Marín].
- Kennedy, Hugh (1996). Muslim Spain and Portugal: a political history of al-Andalus. Harlow: Longman. ISBN 0-582-49515-6.
- Kraemer, Joel. 1997. "Comparing Crescent and Cross (book review)", The Journal of Religion 77, no. 3 (1997): 449–454.
- Kraemer, Joel. 2005. "Moses Maimonides: An Intellectual Portrait", The Cambridge Companion to Maimonides, ed. Kenneth Seeskin. Cambridge: Cambridge University Press. ISBN 0-521-81974-1
- Kraemer, Joel. 2008. Maimonides: the Life and World of One of Civilization's Greatest Minds. NY: Doubleday. ISBN 0-385-51199-X
- Lafuente y Alcántara, Emilio, trans. 1867. Ajbar Machmua (colección de tradiciones): crónica anónima del siglo XI, dada a luz por primera vez, traducida y anotada. Madrid: Real Academia de la Historia y Geografía. In Spanish and Arabic. Also available in the public domain online, see External Links.
- Lévi-Provençal, Évariste (1950). Histoire de l'Espagne musulmane (in French). Paris: Maisonneuve.
- Luscombe, David and Jonathan Riley-Smith, eds. 2004. The New Cambridge Medieval History: Volume 4, c. 1024 – c. 1198, Part 1. Cambridge: Cambridge University Press. ISBN 0-521-41411-3
- Marcus, Ivan G., "Beyond the Sephardic mystique", Orim, vol. 1 (1985): 35–53.
- Marín, Manuela, ed. 1998. The Formation of Al-Andalus, vol. 1: History and Society. Aldershot: Ashgate. ISBN 0-86078-708-7
- Menocal, Maria Rosa. 2002. Ornament of the World: How Muslims, Jews, and Christians Created a Culture of Tolerance in Medieval Spain. Boston: Little, Brown and Company; London: Back Bay Books. ISBN 0-316-16871-8
- Monroe, James T. 1970. Islam and the Arabs in Spanish scholarship: (Sixteenth century to the present). Leiden: Brill.
- Monroe, James T. 1974. Hispano-Arabic Poetry: A Student Anthology. Berkeley, Cal.: University of California Press.
- Netanyahu, Benzion. 1995. The Origins Of The Inquisition in Fifteenth Century Spain. NY: Random House ISBN 0-679-41065-1
- O'Callaghan, Joseph F. 1975. A History of Medieval Spain. Ithaca, NY: Cornell University Press. ISBN 0-8014-9264-5
- Omaar, Rageh. 2005. An Islamic History of Europe. video documentary, BBC 4, August 2005.
- Reinaud, JT (1964). Invasions des Sarrazins en France, et de France en Savoie, en Piémont et en Suisse [Muslim colonies in France, northern Italy and Switzerland] (in French).
- Reilly, Bernard F. 1993. The Medieval Spains. Cambridge: Cambridge University Press. ISBN 0-521-39741-3
- Roth, Norman. 1994. Jews, Visigoths and Muslims in Medieval Spain: Cooperation and Conflict. Leiden: Brill. ISBN 90-04-06131-2
- Sanchez-Albornoz, Claudio. 1974. El Islam de España y el Occidente. Madrid: Espasa-Calpe. Colección Austral; 1560. [Originally published in 1965 in the conference proceedings, L'occidente e l'islam nell'alto medioevo: 2–8 aprile 1964, 2 vols. Spoleto: Centro Italiano di studi sull'Alto Medioevo. Series: Settimane di studio del Centro Italiano di studi sull'Alto Medioevo; 12. Vol. 1:149–308.]
- Schorsch, Ismar 1989. "The myth of Sephardic supremacy", The Leo Baeck Institute Yearbook 34 (1989): 47–66.
- Stavans, Ilan. 2003. The Scroll and the Cross: 1,000 Years of Jewish-Hispanic Literature. London: Routledge. ISBN 0-415-92930-X
- The Art of medieval Spain, A.D. 500–1200. New York: The Metropolitan Museum of Art. 1993. ISBN 0870996851.
- Wasserstein, David J. 1995. "Jewish élites in Al-Andalus", The Jews of Medieval Islam: Community, Society and Identity, ed. Daniel Frank. Leiden: Brill. ISBN 90-04-10404-6
- Sarr, Bilal (2020). "The Nasrid Population and Its Ethnocultural Components". In Fábregas, Adela (ed.). The Nasrid Kingdom of Granada between East and West: (Thirteenth to Fifteenth Centuries). Brill. pp. 177–194. ISBN 978-90-04-44359-4.
