= Reconquista =

Medieval Christian military campaigns (722–1492)

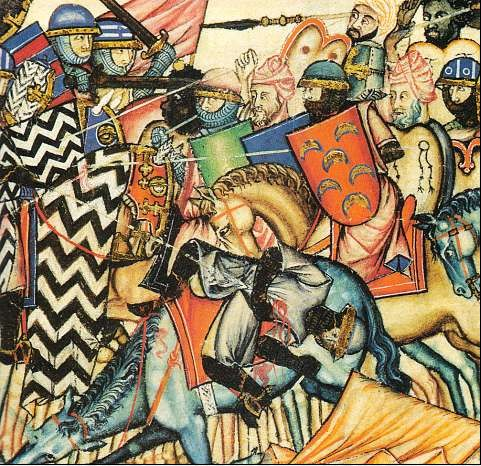
Detail of the Cantiga#63 (13th century), which deals with a late 10th-century battle in San Esteban de Gormaz involving the troops of Count García and Almanzor

The Reconquista (Spanish and Portuguese for 'reconquest') (Note: While it is largely spelled in the same way, the pronunciation of it varies among the different languages which are spoken on the Iberian Peninsula as well as in neighboring territories. The pronunciations of it are as follows: Asturleonese, Galician and Spanish: [rekoŋˈkista]; Portuguese: [ʁɨkõˈkiʃtɐ]; Catalan: [rəkuŋˈkestə] or [rekoŋˈkesta], spelled Reconquesta; colloquially also known as and spelled Reconquista (pron. [rəkuŋˈkistə] or [rekoŋˈkista]); Basque: [erekoŋkis̺ta], spelled Errekonkista; Aragonese: [ɾekoŋˈkjesta], spelled Reconquiesta; Aranese and Gascon: [rekuŋˈkɛsta], spelled Reconquèsta, or [rekuŋˈkistɔ], spelled Reconquista; French: [ʁəkɔ̃kɛt], spelled Reconquête; Reconquista commonly used as well.) (Note: Arabic: الاسترداد, romanized: al-Istirdād, lit. 'the Recovery', although less common) or the fall of al-Andalus (Note: سقوط الأندلس suqūṭ al-Andalus 'the fall of al-Andalus'.) was a series of military campaigns by northern Iberian Christian polities against Muslim-ruled al-Andalus, which had been part of the Visigothic Kingdom before the Muslim Conquest of 711. The Reconquista concluded in 1492 with the capture of Granada by the Catholic Monarchs of Spain, thereby ending the presence of any Muslim rule on the Iberian Peninsula.

The beginning of the Reconquista is traditionally dated to the Battle of Covadonga (c. 718 or 722), approximately a decade after the Muslim conquest of the Iberian Peninsula began, in which the army of the Kingdom of Asturias achieved the first Christian victory over the forces of the Umayyad Caliphate since the beginning of the military invasion. By the early 11th century, the Umayyad state of Córdoba fell apart under the sustained military pressure into a series of petty successor states known as taifas. The northern kingdoms advanced further against these fiefdoms and often made them pay parias – tribute to ensure protection.

Following an Almohad resurgence in the 12th century, the Christian kingdoms of León, Castile, Aragón, Navarre, and Portugal made further territorial gains over the ensuing decades. After the decisive Battle of Las Navas de Tolosa in 1212, major Muslim-held centres fell to Christian forces over the course of the 13th century, including Siege of Córdoba in 1236 and the Siege of Seville in 1248, leaving Granada as the only remaining Muslim-ruled state in the south, where it survived as a tributary polity. The king's actions took precedence over those of the local lords with the help of military orders and also supported by Repoblación, the repopulation of territory by Christian kingdoms. After the surrender of Granada in January 1492, the entire Iberian peninsula was controlled by Christian rulers. On 30 July 1492, as a result of the Alhambra Decree, the Jewish communities of Castile and Aragon—some 200,000 people—were forcibly expelled. The conquest was followed by a series of edicts (1499–1526) that forced the conversions of Muslims in Castile, Navarre, and Aragon; these same groups were expelled from Habsburg Spain by a series of decrees starting in 1609. Approximately three million Muslims emigrated or were driven out of Spain between 1492 and 1610.

Beginning in the 19th century, traditional historiography has used the term Reconquista as the restoration of the Visigothic Kingdom over conquered territories. The concept of Reconquista, consolidated in Spanish historiography in the second half of the 19th century, was associated with Spanish nationalism during the period of Romantic nationalism. Recent scholarship describes the Reconquista as a process that unfolded in multiple episodes, with regional variation. It is the inspiration for the Moros y cristianos festival, popular in the southern Valencian Community, and which is also celebrated in parts of Spanish America. Pursuant to an Islamophobic worldview, the concept is a symbol of significance for the 21st-century European far-right.

== Concept and duration ==
The term 'Reconquista' was not used by medieval writers to describe the struggle between Christians and Muslims in the Iberian Peninsula. Since its development as a term in historiography occurred centuries after the events it references, it has acquired various meanings. Its meaning as an actual "reconquest" has been subject to the particular concerns or prejudices of scholars, who have sometimes wielded it as a weapon in ideological disputes.

A discernible irredentist ideology that became part of the concept of Christian conquest appeared in writings by the end of the 9th century. For example, the anonymous Christian chronicle Chronica Prophetica (883–884) claimed a historical connection between Tariq ibn Ziyad's conquest of the Visigothic Kingdom in 711 and the Kingdom of Asturias in which the document was produced, and stressed a Christian and Muslim cultural and religious divide in Hispania, and a necessity to drive out the Muslims and restore conquered territories. Literature from both sides described a divide based on ethnicity and culture between the inhabitants of the small Christian kingdoms of the north and the dominant elite in the Muslim-ruled south.

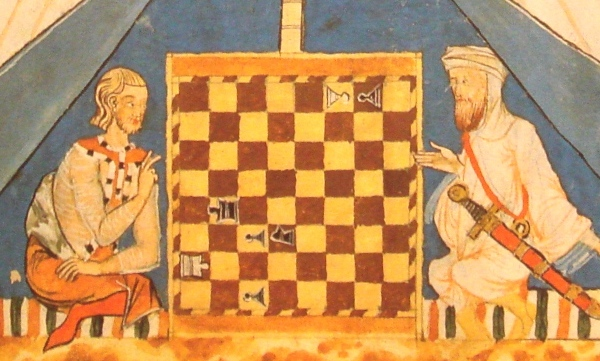
One of the arguments challenging the concept of Reconquista is that for the majority of the 781 years of Islamic rule in Iberia, Muslims and Christians coexisted and were not at war with each other.

The linear approach to the origins of the Reconquista adopted in early twentieth-century historiography is complicated by several issues. For example, periods of peaceful coexistence, or at least of limited and localised skirmishes on the frontiers, were more prevalent over the 781 years of Muslim rule than periods of significant military conflict. Additionally, both Christian and Muslim rulers fought other Christians and Muslims, and cooperation and alliances between Muslims and Christians were not uncommon, such as between Íñigo Arista, the founder of the Kingdom of Pamplona (later 'Navarre'), and the Banu Qasi as early as the 9th century. Blurring distinctions even further were the mercenaries from both sides who fought for whoever paid the most. The period is seen today to have had long episodes of relative religious coexistence and tolerance such as the Golden age of Jewish culture in Spain.

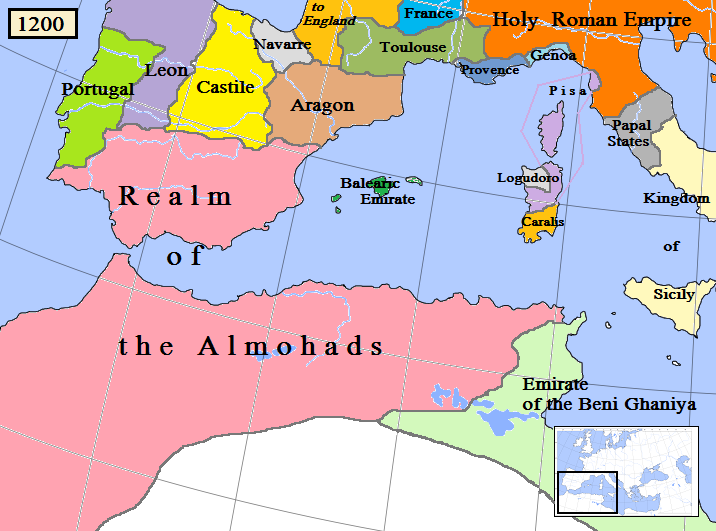
The Almohad Caliphate and surrounding states, including the Christian Kingdoms of Portugal, Leon, Castile, Navarre, and the Crown of Aragon, c. 1200

The memoirs of the last Zirid ruler of Granada, Abdallah ibn Buluggin, recalls a conversation with the Christian nobleman, Sisnando Davídiz, who had arrived to collect parias:

He said to me face to face: "Al-Andalus originally belonged to the Christians. Then they were defeated by the Arabs and driven to the most inhospitable region, Jillīqiya. Now that they are strong and capable, the Christians desire to recover what they have lost by force. This can only be achieved by weakness and encroachment. In the long run, when it has neither men nor money, we'll be able to recover it without any difﬁculty".

Documents dating from the 10th and 11th centuries are mute on any idea of reconquest. The Crusades, which started late in the 11th century, birthed the religious ideology of a reconquest. In al-Andalus, Christian states of that era were confronted by the century-long rule of the Sanhaja-ruled Almoravid dynasty and subsequently the religious extremism of the Almohad Caliphate of the Masmuda, which supported a similarly staunch ideology of jihad.

Propaganda accounts of Muslim-Christian hostility came into being to support that idea, most notably the Chanson de Roland, an 11th-century French chanson de geste that offers a fictionalised retelling of the Battle of Roncevaux Pass dealing with the Saracens or Moors, and centuries later introduced in the French school system to instill moral and national values in the population following the 1870 defeat of the French in the Franco-Prussian War, regardless of the actual events.

The consolidation of the modern idea of a Reconquista is inextricably linked to the foundational myths of 19th-century Spanish nationalism, associated with the development of a Centralist, Castilian, and staunchly Catholic nationalism, evoking nationalistic, romantic and sometimes colonialist themes. The concept gained further track in the 20th century during the Francoist dictatorship. It thus became one of the key tenets of the historiographical discourse of National Catholicism, the mythological and ideological identity of the regime. The discourse was underpinned in its most traditional version by an avowed 'historical illegitimacy' of al-Andalus and the subsequent glorification of the Christian conquest.

The idea of a "liberation war" against Muslims, who were viewed as foreigners, suited the anti-Republican rebels of the Spanish Civil War. This Nationalist faction agitated for the banner of the patria, the fatherland which, according to them, was being threatened by regionalism and communism. Their rebellious pursuit was thus a crusade for the restoration of the unity of the Church and State, where Franco stood for both Pelagius of Asturias and El Cid.

The Reconquista has become a rallying call for right-wing populist and far-right parties of Spain such as Vox to expel from office incumbent progressive or peripheral nationalist options as well as their values in different political contexts.

Similar propaganda was circulated during the Spanish Civil War by the Republicans, who wanted to portray their enemies as foreign invaders, especially given the prominence of the Army of Africa among Franco's troops. This army consisted of Berber soldiers of the Tiradores de Ifni and Regulares from the Spanish protectorate in Morocco.

Traditionalist scholarship viewed the Reconquista as proof that the process of Christian state-building in Iberia was often defined by the reclamation of lands that had been lost to foreigners in past generations. State-building was characterised—at least in ideological, if not practical, terms—as a process by which Iberian states were being "rebuilt". Current historians dispute the entire concept of the Reconquista as created a posteriori in the service of later political goals. A few historians point out that Spain and Portugal did not previously exist as nations and the heirs of the Christian Visigothic Kingdom were not reconquering them, as the name suggests. One of the first Spanish intellectuals to question the idea of a "reconquest" that lasted for eight centuries was José Ortega y Gasset, writing in the first half of the 20th century. However, the term Reconquista is still widely in use.

=== Mirror medieval narratives ===
The emirs of Córdoba do not seem to have brought forward a narrative of territorial recovery for losses in northern Iberia in the 8th and 9th centuries. They never controlled the whole Iberian peninsula nor did they actually put much effort into such control even at the peak of their power. A narrative of recovery was formulated in the wake of the 1064 Christian taking of Barbastro (as the place was conquered in 1065 by al-Muqtadir ibn Hud), during the first taifa period. Whatever the case, the Muslim retaking of Barbastro was soon overshadowed by the 1085 Christian conquest of Toledo (a much more important city), which proved to be permanent. The rhetoric of recovery was more prominently used as a trope by Almoravids and Almohads, to the degree that their legitimacy as foreign dynasties relied on their ability to counter Christian expansion. It is so far recorded for successful military operations in locations such as Valencia and Talavera (Almoravids) and Almería and Silves (Almohads).

== Background ==
=== Landing in Visigothic Hispania and initial expansion ===
In 711, a predominantly Berber army commanded by Tariq ibn Ziyad crossed the Strait of Gibraltar to invade Iberia, engaging a Visigothic force led by King Roderic at the Battle of Guadalete (19–26 July) in a moment of severe infighting and division across the Visigothic Kingdom of Hispania. Many of Roderic's troops deserted, leading to his defeat. He drowned while crossing the Guadalquivir.

After Roderic's defeat, the Umayyad governor of Ifriqiya, Musa ibn Nusayr, joined Tariq, directing a campaign against different towns and strongholds in Hispania. Some, like Mérida, Córdoba, or Zaragoza in 712, and probably Toledo as well, were captured. Others agreed to a treaty in exchange for maintaining autonomy, such as Theodemir's dominion in the southeastern peninsula, or the area of Pamplona. The invading Islamic armies did not exceed 60,000 men.

=== Islamic rule ===
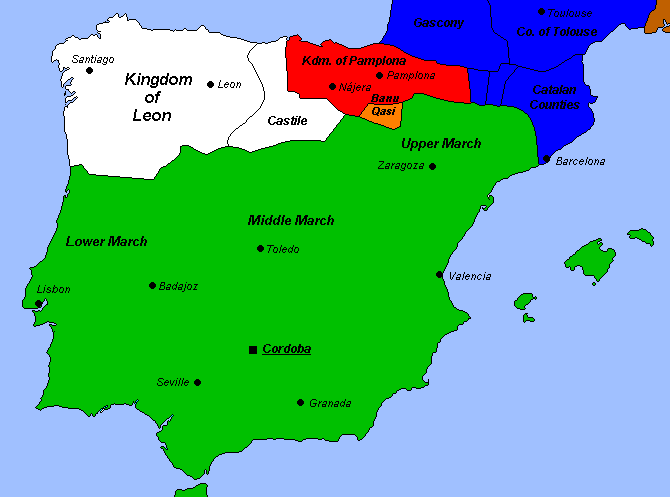
The Caliphate of Córdoba in the early 10th century

After the establishment of a local emirate, Al-Walid I, ruler of the Umayyad Caliphate, removed many of the successful Muslim commanders. Tariq ibn Ziyad was recalled to Damascus and replaced with Musa ibn-Nusayr, who had been his former superior. Musa's son, Abd al-Aziz ibn Musa, apparently married Egilona, Roderic's widow, and established his regional government in Seville. He was suspected of being under the influence of his wife and was accused of wanting to convert to Christianity and of planning a secessionist rebellion. A concerned Al-Walid I ordered Abd al-Aziz's assassination. Al-Walid I died in 715 and was succeeded by his brother, Sulayman ibn Abd al-Malik. Sulayman appears to have punished the surviving Musa ibn Nusayr, who died during the Hajj in 716. In the end, Abd al-Aziz ibn Musa's cousin, Ayyub ibn Habib al-Lakhmi, became the wali (governor) of al-Andalus.

A significant weakness among the Muslim conquerors was the ethnic tension between Berbers and Arabs. The Berbers were indigenous inhabitants of North Africa who had only recently converted to Islam; they provided most of the soldiery of the invading armies, but experienced systematised discrimination. This latent internal conflict jeopardised Umayyad unity. The Umayyad forces arrived and crossed the Pyrenees by 719 and conquered Narbona. The last Visigothic king, Ardo, resisted them in Septimania, where he fended off the Berber–Arab armies until 720.

After the Umayyad conquests of 711–718 and the establishment of the state, an expedition suffered a major defeat at the Battle of Toulouse against the armies of the Duchy of Aquitaine. Odo the Great had married his daughter to Munuza, a rebel and lord of Cerdanya (trans-Pyrenean Catalunya), in an attempt to secure his southern borders to fend off Charles Martel's attacks on the north. However, a major punitive expedition led by Amir Abd al-Rahman ibn Abd Allah al-Ghafiqi defeated and killed Uthman, and the governor then mustered an expedition north across the western Pyrenees, looted areas up to Bordeaux, and then defeated Odo in the Battle of the River Garonne in 732.

A desperate Odo turned to his archrival Charles Martel for help, who led the remaining Aquitanian armies alongside his Frankish forces against the Umayyad armies, defeating them in the Battle of Tours on 10 October 732, killing al Ghafiqi. While Muslim rule began to recede in what is now France, it would remain in the Iberian Peninsula for another 760 years.

== Early Reconquista ==
=== Beginning of the Reconquista ===
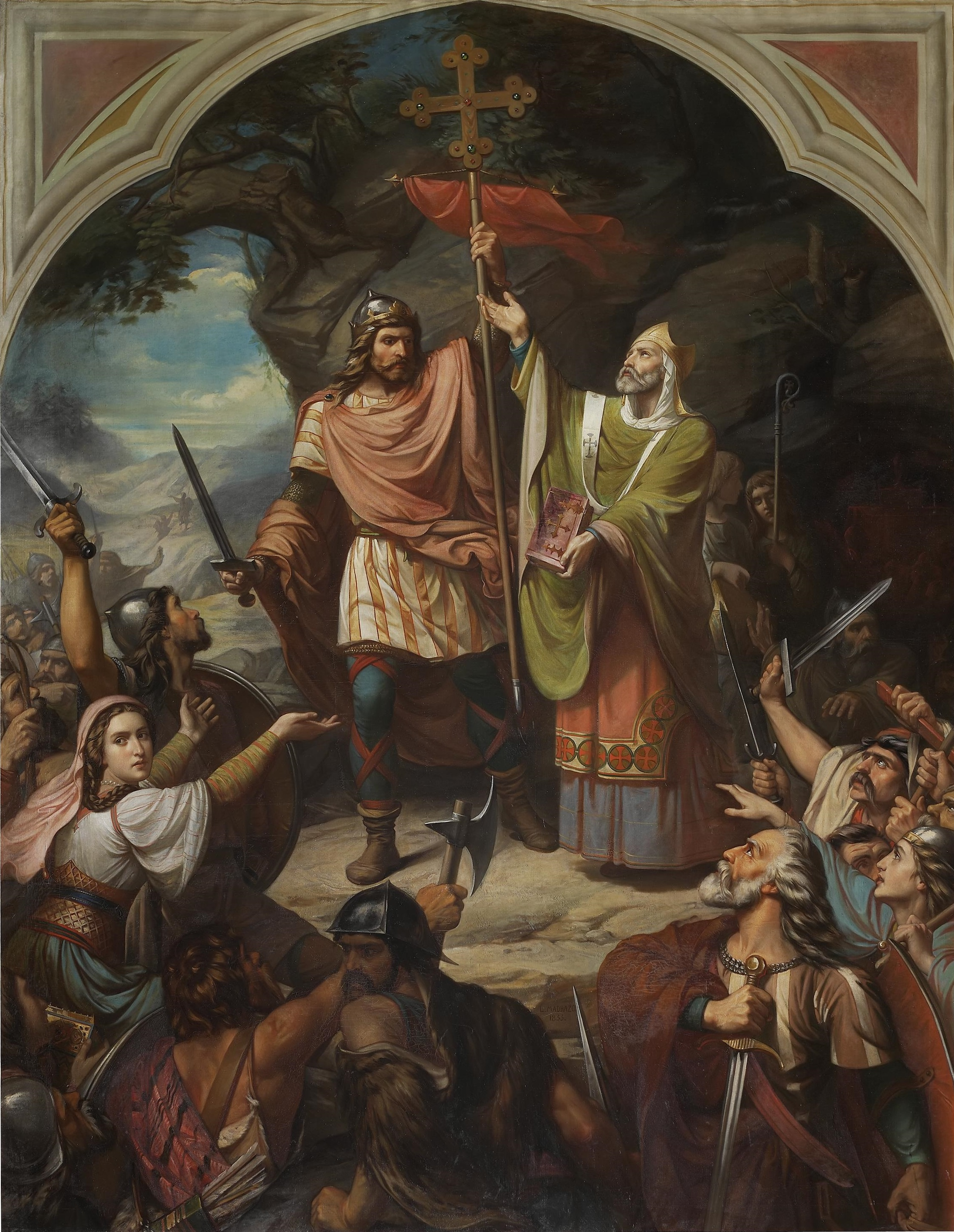
Don Pelayo in Covadonga, Luis de Madrazo y kuntz, The painting depicts Don Pelayo, the first monarch of the Kingdom of Asturias, in the Battle of Covadonga, where he achieved the first Christian victory over Muslim forces in the Iberian Peninsula. This event is traditionally regarded as the symbolic beginning of the Reconquista.

A drastic increase of taxes on Christians by the emir Anbasa ibn Suhaym Al-Kalbi provoked several rebellions in al-Andalus, which a series of succeeding weak emirs were unable to suppress. Around 722, a Muslim military expedition was sent into the north in late summer to suppress a rebellion led by Pelagius of Asturias (Pelayo in Spanish, Pelayu in Asturian). Traditional historiography has hailed Pelagius's victory at Covadonga as the beginning of the Reconquista.

Two northern realms, Navarre and Asturias, despite their small size, demonstrated an ability to maintain their independence. Because the Umayyad rulers based in Córdoba were unable to extend their power over the Pyrenees, they decided to consolidate their power within the Iberian peninsula. Arab-Berber forces made periodic incursions deep into Asturias, but this area was a cul-de-sac on the fringes of the Islamic world fraught with inconveniences during campaigns and of little interest.

During the first decades, Asturian control over part of the kingdom was weak, and for this reason it had to be continually strengthened through matrimonial alliances and war with other peoples from the north of the Iberian Peninsula. After Pelayo's death in 737, his son Favila of Asturias was elected king but he was killed by a bear during a trial of courage. Pelayo's dynasty in Asturias survived and gradually expanded the kingdom's boundaries until all of northwest Hispania was included by roughly 775. However, credit is due to him and to his successors, the Banu Alfons from the Arab chronicles. Alfonso I of Asturias led the reconquest of Galicia. It comes then as no surprise that, besides focusing on raiding the Arab-Berber strongholds of the Meseta, Alfonso I of Asturias centred on expanding his domains at the expense of the neighbouring Galicians and Basques at either side of his realm just as much. Further expansion of the northwestern kingdom towards the south occurred during the reign of Alfonso II of Asturias (from 791 to 842). A king's expedition arrived in and pillaged Lisbon in 798, probably concerted with the Carolingians.

The Asturian kingdom became firmly established with the recognition of Alfonso II as king of Asturias by Charlemagne and the Pope. During his reign, the bones of St. James the Great were declared to have been found in Galicia, at Santiago de Compostela. Pilgrims from all over Europe opened a channel of communication between the isolated Asturias and the Carolingian lands and beyond, centuries later.

=== Frankish invasions ===
After the Umayyad conquest of the Iberian heartland of the Visigothic kingdom, the Muslims crossed the Pyrenees and gradually took control of Septimania, starting in 719 with the conquest of Narbonne through 725 when Carcassonne and Nîmes were secured. From the stronghold of Narbonne, they tried to conquer Aquitaine but suffered a major defeat at the Battle of Toulouse (721).

Ten years after halting their advance north, Odo of Aquitaine married his daughter to Uthman ibn Naissa, a rebel Berber and lord of Cerdanya (perhaps all of contemporary Catalonia as well), in an attempt to secure his southern borders to fend off Charles Martel's attacks on the north. However, a major punitive expedition led by Abdul Rahman Al Ghafiqi, the latest emir of al-Andalus, defeated and killed Uthman.

After expelling the Muslims from Narbonne in 759 and driving their forces back over the Pyrenees, the Carolingian king Pepin the Short conquered Aquitaine in an eight-year war. Charlemagne followed his father by subduing Aquitaine by creating counties, taking the Church as his ally and appointing counts of Frankish or Burgundian stock, like his loyal William of Gellone, making Toulouse his base for expeditions against al-Andalus. Charlemagne decided to organize a regional subkingdom, the Spanish March, which included part of contemporary Catalonia, in order to keep the Aquitanians in check and to secure the southern border of the Carolingian Empire against Muslim incursions. In 781, his three-year-old son Louis was crowned king of Aquitaine, under the supervision of Charlemagne's trustee William of Gellone, and was nominally in charge of the incipient Spanish March.

Meanwhile, the takeover of the southern fringes of al-Andalus by Abd ar-Rahman I in 756 was opposed by Yusuf ibn Abd al-Rahman, autonomous governor (wāli) or king (malik) of al-Andalus. Abd ar-Rahman I expelled Yusuf from Cordova, but it took still decades for him to expand to the north-western Andalusian districts. He was also opposed externally by the Abbasids of Baghdad who failed in their attempts to overthrow him. In 778, Abd al-Rahman closed in on the Ebro valley. Regional lords saw the Umayyad emir at the gates and decided to enlist the nearby Christian Franks. According to Ali ibn al-Athir, a Kurdish historian of the 12th century, Charlemagne received the envoys of Sulayman al-Arabi, Husayn, and Abu Taur at the Diet of Paderborn in 777. These rulers of Zaragoza, Girona, Barcelona, and Huesca were enemies of Abd ar-Rahman I, and in return for Frankish military aid against him offered their homage and allegiance.

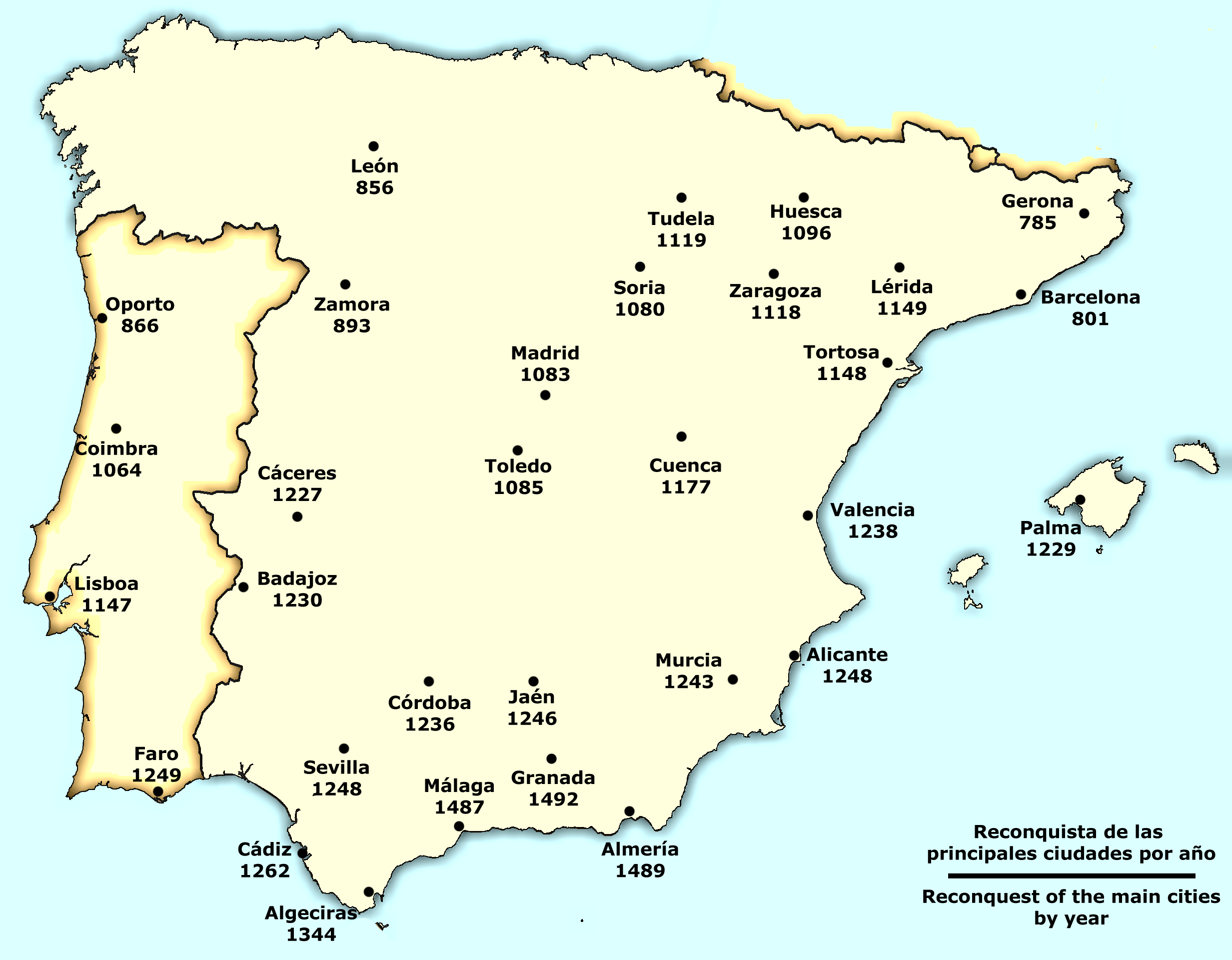
Reconquista of the main towns, per year (present-day state borders)

Charlemagne, seeing an opportunity, agreed upon an expedition and crossed the Pyrenees in 778. Near the city of Zaragoza Charlemagne received the homage of Sulayman al-Arabi. However the city, under the leadership of Husayn, closed its gates and refused to submit. Unable to conquer the city by force, Charlemagne decided to retreat. On the way home the rearguard of the army was ambushed and destroyed by Basque forces at the Battle of Roncevaux Pass. The Song of Roland, a highly romanticised account of this battle, would later become one of the most famous chansons de geste of the Middle Ages. Around 788 Abd ar-Rahman I died and was succeeded by Hisham I. In 792 Hisham proclaimed a jihad, advancing in 793 against the Kingdom of Asturias and Carolingian Septimania (Gothia). They defeated William of Gellone, Count of Toulouse, in battle, but William led an expedition the following year across the eastern Pyrenees. Barcelona, a major city, became a potential target for the Franks in 797, as its governor Zeid rebelled against the Umayyad emir of Córdoba. An army of the emir managed to recapture it in 799, but Louis, at the head of an army, crossed the Pyrenees and besieged the city for seven months until it finally capitulated in 801.

The main passes in the Pyrenees were Roncesvalles, Somport and La Jonquera. Charlemagne established across them the vassal regions of Pamplona, Aragon, and Catalonia respectively. Catalonia was itself formed from a number of small counties, including Pallars, Girona, and Urgell; it was called the Marca Hispanica by the late 8th century. They protected the eastern Pyrenees passes and shores and were under the direct control of the Frankish kings. Pamplona's first king was Iñigo Arista, who allied with his Muslim kinsmen the Banu Qasi and rebelled against Frankish overlordship and overcame a Carolingian expedition in 824 that led to the setup of the Kingdom of Pamplona. Aragon, founded in 809 by Aznar Galíndez, grew around Jaca and the high valleys of the Aragon River, protecting the old Roman road. By the end of the 10th century, Aragon, which then was just a county, was annexed by Navarre. Sobrarbe and Ribagorza were small counties and had little significance to the progress of the Reconquista.

In the late 9th century under Count Wilfred, Barcelona became the de facto capital of the region. It controlled the other counties' policies in a union, which led in 948 to the independence of Barcelona under Count Borrel II, who declared that the new dynasty in France (the Capets) were not the legitimate rulers of France nor, as a result, of his county. These states were small and, with the exception of Navarre, did not have the capacity for attacking the Muslims in the way that Asturias did, but their mountainous geography rendered them relatively safe from being conquered, and their borders remained stable for two centuries.

== Reconquista as crusade ==
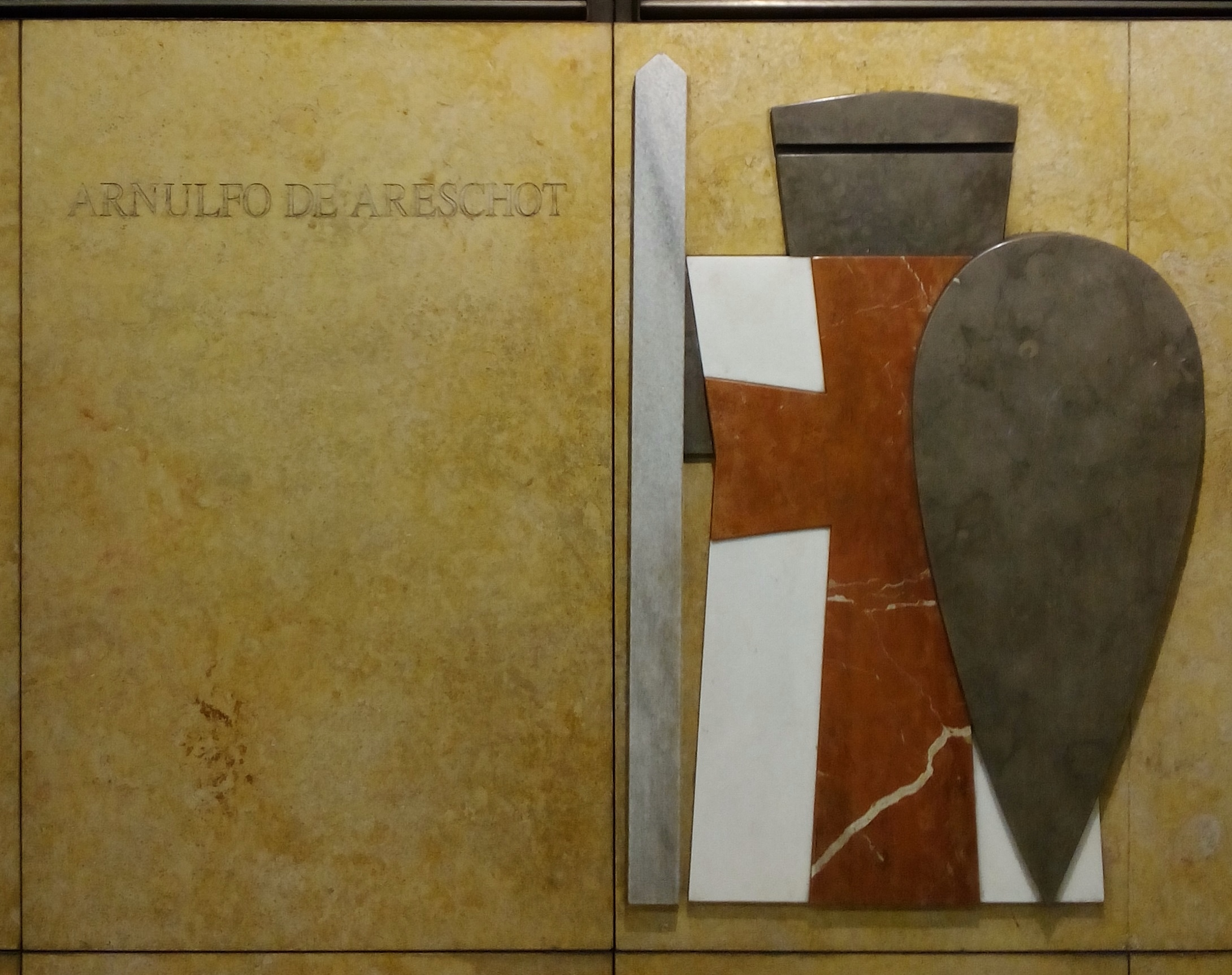
Stylized depiction of Arnout IV, Count of Aarschot, in a Lisbon Metro station

The 1064 conquest of Barbastro, sanctioned by Pope Alexander II, was considered as a crusade rehearsal. However, the mentality of the Iberian Christian rulers of the era was generally removed from ideals of defence of Christendom. The motivations for warfare against Muslims were generally more mundane: obtaining parias, or loot, and rivalry with other Christians. In the Castile of Alfonso VI, who was called "the lord of the three religions", parias were preferred over conquest. Pope Urban II tried to prevent Iberians from going East and to engage locally in warfare against Muslims instead, conceding the same indulgences to those who were dying while fighting Saracens in the Iberian Peninsula as to those who were dying in the Holy Land. Whatever the case, after early 12th century cross-pollination in the Holy Land, Iberian military orders were created in the image of the Templars and the Hospitallers.

At the First Council of the Lateran, Pope Callixtus II declared fighting against Muslims in the Iberian Peninsula as part of Crusades and its participants as Crusaders having an equal spiritual standing with those in the east.

In the Second Crusade (1147–1149), after appeals by Afonso Henriques and the apparent acquiescence of Bernard of Clairvaux, non-Iberian (German, Flemish, English) crusaders en route to the Holy Land played a role in the 1147 conquest of Lisbon, although it did not end up legitimised as a crusading enterprise. Afonso Henriques' rival cousin Alfonso Raimúndez benefited instead from the Divina dispensatione papal bull, managing to draw a Genoese and Pisan naval contingent to the 1147 siege and conquest of Almería. The 1148 conquest of Tortosa led by the County of Barcelona and the Common of Genoa, in which English and Flemish crusaders as well as Templars and Hospitallers took part, also enjoyed from the papal endorsement.

Crusade bulls were weaponised beyond direct engagement against Saracens, as Pope Celestine III sided with Sancho I of Portugal and granted him a bull in 1197 to fight against Alfonso IX of León for collaborating with Almohads, although the crusading operation did not come to fruition in the battlefield.

Archbishop Rodrigo Jiménez de Rada tried to internationalize the preparations for the campaign against the Almohad Caliphate that resulted into the 1212 Battle of Las Navas, but despite the papal indulgences by Innocent III, the event remained largely an Iberian affair on the Christian side, as almost all 'ultramontane' (trans-Pyreneean) international forces gathered for the campaign deserted before the battle. The Catholic Church considered nonetheless the campaign a true crusade.

After his conquest of Córdoba, Ferdinand III of Castile requested financial aid from Pope Gregory IX. The pope bestowed upon him the title of Athleta Christi besides providing him with a funding of 40,000 gold pieces per year to further his campaign. He later requested additional money, which was granted to him by Pope Innocent IV. Ferdinand went on to conquer Seville as well as several other major cities from the Islamic states, making the biggest advance yet in the Reconquista.

Upon learning of the victory of the Crusade of Valencia under James I of Aragon, Pope Gregory IX declared to "all the world":

Our most dear son in Christ ... with many Catholic men, stirred by zeal for faith and signed by the sign of the cross, has ripped the Kingdom of Valencia from the hands of the pagans

Emphasizing the need to protect the new conquest, the Pope also offered crusader status to those who would defend it. French King Louis IX gave King James a thorn from the Crown of Thorns relic he had in Sainte Chapelle Church.

== Northern Christian realms ==
The northern principalities and kingdoms survived in their mountainous strongholds (see above). However, they started a definite territorial expansion south at the turn of the 10th century (Leon, Najera). The fall of the Caliphate of Cordova (1031) heralded a period of military expansion for the northern kingdoms, now divided into several mighty regional powers after the division of the Kingdom of Navarre (1035). Myriad autonomous Christian kingdoms emerged thereafter.

=== Kingdom of Asturias (718–924) ===
The Kingdom of Asturias was located in the Cantabrian Mountains, a wet and mountainous region in the north of the Iberian Peninsula. It was the first Christian power to emerge. The kingdom was established by a Visigothic nobleman, named Pelagius (Pelayo), who had possibly returned after the Battle of Guadalete in 711 and was elected leader of the Asturians, and the remnants of the gens Gothorum (the Hispano-Gothic aristocracy and the Hispano-Visigothic population who took refuge in the North). Historian Joseph F. O'Callaghan says an unknown number of them fled and took refuge in Asturias or Septimania. In Asturias they supported Pelagius's uprising, and joining with the indigenous leaders, formed a new aristocracy.

The population of the mountain region consisted of native Astures, Galicians, Cantabri, Basques and other groups unassimilated into Hispano-Gothic society, laying the foundations for the Kingdom of Asturias and starting the Astur-Leonese dynasty that spanned from 718 to 1037 and led the initial efforts in the Iberian peninsula to take back the territories then ruled by the Moors. Although the new dynasty first ruled in the mountains of Asturias, with the capital of the kingdom established initially in Cangas de Onís, and was in its dawn mostly concerned with securing the territory and settling the monarchy, the latest kings (particularly Alfonso III of Asturias) emphasised the nature of the new kingdom as heir of that in Toledo and the restoration of the Visigothic nation in order to vindicate the expansion to the south. However, such claims have been overall dismissed by modern historiography, emphasizing the distinct, autochthonous nature of the Cantabro-Asturian and Vasconic domains with no continuation to the Gothic Kingdom of Toledo.

Pelagius's kingdom initially was little more than a gathering point for the existing guerrilla forces. During the first decades, the Asturian dominion over the different areas of the kingdom was still lax, and for this reason it had to be continually strengthened through matrimonial alliances with other powerful families from the north of the Iberian Peninsula. Thus, Ermesinda, Pelagius's daughter, was married to Alfonso, son of Dux Peter of Cantabria. Alfonso's son Fruela married Munia, a Basque from Álava, after crushing a Basque uprising (probably resistance). Their son is reported to be Alfonso II, while Alfonso I's daughter Adosinda married Silo, a local chief from the area of Flavionavia, Pravia.

Asturias in 800.

Alfonso's military strategy was typical of Iberian warfare at the time. Lacking the means needed for wholesale conquest of large territories, his tactics consisted of raids in the border regions of Vardulia. With the plunder he gained further military forces could be paid, enabling him to raid the Muslim cities of Lisbon, Zamora, and Coimbra. Alfonso I also expanded his realm westwards by conquering Galicia.

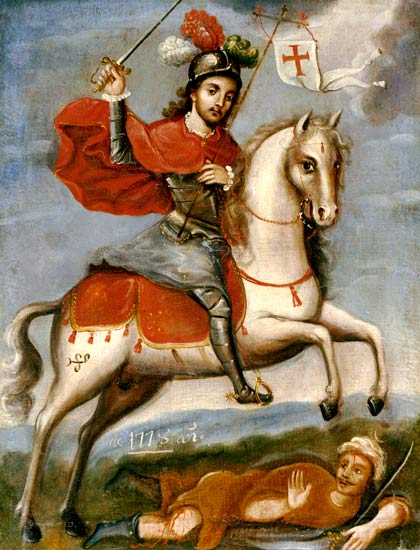
Saint James the Great depicted as Saint James the Moor-slayer

During the reign of King Alfonso II (791–842), the kingdom was firmly established, and a series of Muslim raids caused the transfer of the Asturian capital to Oviedo. The king is believed to have initiated diplomatic contacts with the kings of Pamplona and the Carolingians, thereby gaining official recognition for his kingdom and his crown from the Pope and Charlemagne.

The bones of St. James the Great were proclaimed to have been found in Iria Flavia (present day Padrón) in 813 or probably two or three decades later. The cult of the saint was transferred later to Compostela (from Latin campus stellae, literally "the star field"), possibly in the early 10th century when the focus of Asturian power moved from the mountains over to Leon, to become the Kingdom of León or Galicia-Leon. Santiago's were among many saint relics proclaimed to have been found across north-western Hispania. Pilgrims started to flow in from other Iberian Christian realms, sowing the seeds of the later Way of Saint James (11–12th century) that sparked the enthusiasm and religious zeal of continental Christian Europe for centuries.

Despite numerous battles, neither the Umayyads nor the Asturians had sufficient forces to secure control over these northern territories. Under the reign of Ramiro, famed for the Battle of Clavijo, the border began to slowly move southward and Asturian holdings in Castile, Galicia, and Leon were fortified, and an intensive program of re-population of the countryside began in those territories. In 924 the Kingdom of Asturias became the Kingdom of León, when Leon became the seat of the royal court.

=== Kingdom of León (910–1230) ===
Alfonso III of Asturias repopulated the strategically important city Leon and established it as his capital. King Alfonso began a series of campaigns to establish control over all the lands north of the Douro river. He reorganised his territories into the major duchies (Galicia and Portugal) and major counties (Saldaña and Castile), and fortified the borders with many castles. At his death in 910 the shift in regional power was completed as the kingdom became the Kingdom of León. From this power base, his heir Ordoño II was able to organize attacks against Toledo and even Seville.

The Caliphate of Córdoba was gaining power, and began to attack Leon. King Ordoño allied with Navarre against Abd-al-Rahman, but they were defeated in Valdejunquera in 920. For the next 80 years, the Kingdom of León suffered civil wars, Moorish attack, internal intrigues and assassinations, and the partial independence of Galicia and Castile, thus delaying the reconquest and weakening the Christian forces. It was not until the following century that the Christians started to see their conquests as part of a long-term effort to restore the unity of the Visigothic kingdom.

The only point during this period when the situation became hopeful for Leon was the reign of Ramiro II. King Ramiro, in alliance with Fernán González of Castile and his retinue of caballeros villanos, defeated the Caliph in Simancas in 939. After this battle, when the Caliph barely escaped with his guard and the rest of the army was destroyed, King Ramiro obtained 12 years of peace, but he had to give González the independence of Castile as payment for his help in the battle. After this defeat, Moorish attacks abated until Almanzor began his campaigns. Alfonso V finally regained control over his domains in 1002. Navarre, though attacked by Almanzor, remained intact.

The conquest of Leon did not include Galicia which was left to temporary independence after the withdrawal of the Leonese king. Galicia was conquered soon after (by Ferdinand, son of Sancho the Great, around 1038). Subsequent kings titled themselves kings of Galicia and Leon, instead of merely king of Leon as the two were in a personal union.

At the end of the 11th century, King Afonso VI of León reached the Tagus (1085), repeating the same policy of alliances and developing collaboration with Frankish knights. The original repoblación was then complete. His aim was to create a Hispanic empire like the Visigothic Kingdom (418–720) to reclaim his hegemony over the entire Iberian Peninsula. Within this context, the territory between the Douro and the Tagus was repopulated and a western nucleus was formed in Portugal that wanted independence. This marks the beginning of the Portuguese Repovoação ou Repovoamento occurred during the reigns of the House of Burgundy up to the middle of the thirteenth century when the Portuguese Reconquista was also brought to an end with the ultimate conquering of Gharb al-Andalus when in March 1249 the city of Faro was conquered by Afonso III of Portugal.

=== Kingdom of Castile (1037–1230) ===
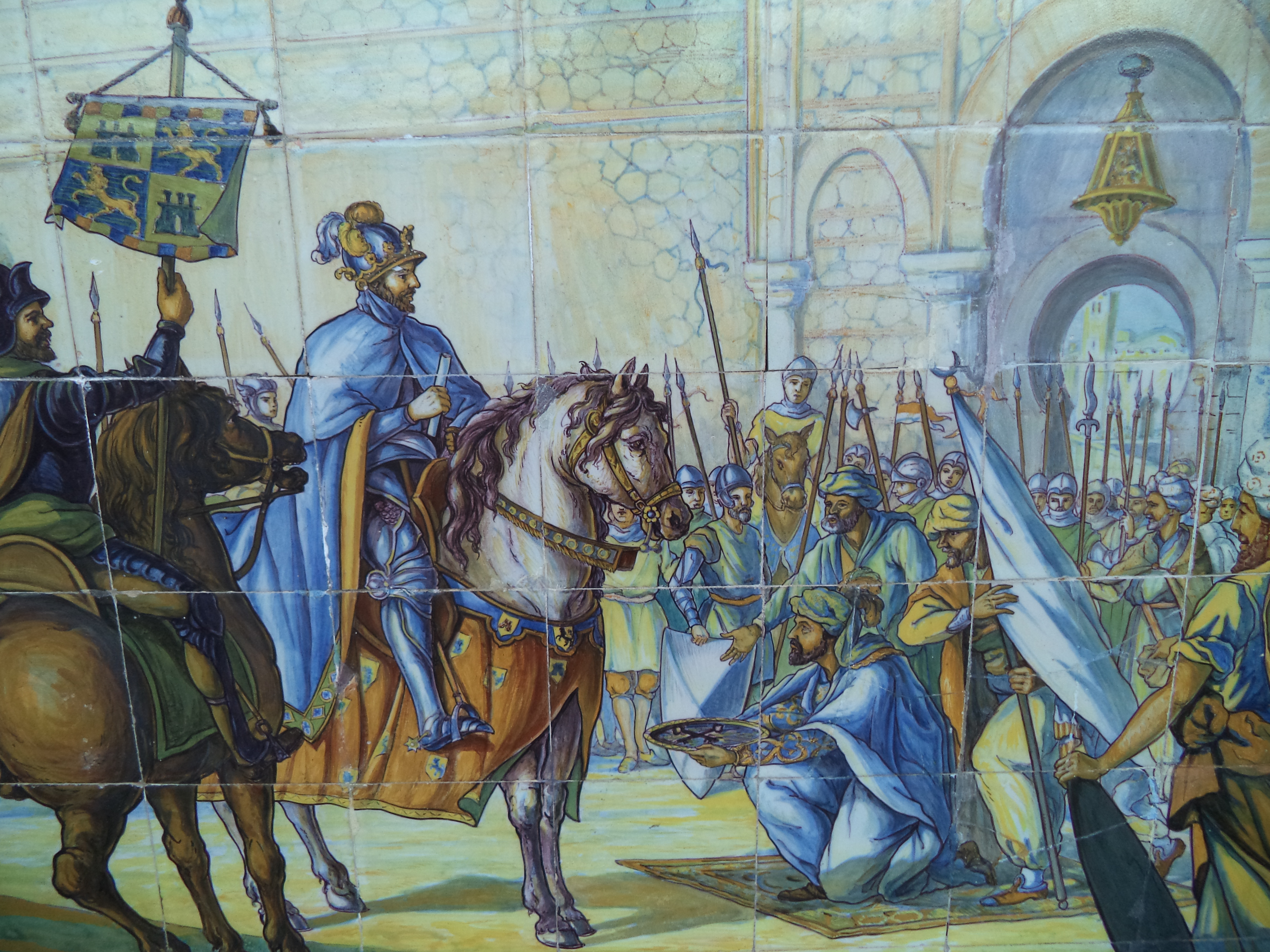
20th century ceramic depiction of the conquest of Toledo by Alfonso VI, at the Plaza de España

Ferdinand I of Leon was the leading king of the mid-11th century. He conquered Coimbra and attacked the taifa kingdoms, often demanding the tributes known as parias. Ferdinand's strategy was to continue to demand parias until the taifa was greatly weakened both militarily and financially. He also repopulated the Borders with numerous fueros. Following the Navarrese tradition, on his death in 1064 he divided his kingdom between his sons. His son Sancho II of Castile wanted to reunite the kingdom of his father and attacked his brothers, with a young noble at his side: Rodrigo Díaz, later known as El Cid Campeador. Sancho was killed in the siege of Zamora by the traitor Bellido Dolfos (also known as Vellido Adolfo) in 1072. His brother Alfonso VI took over Leon, Castile and Galicia.

Alfonso VI the Brave gave more power to the fueros and repopulated Segovia, Ávila and Salamanca. Once he had secured the Borders, King Alfonso conquered the powerful Taifa kingdom of Toledo in 1085. Toledo, which was the former capital of the Visigoths, was a very important landmark, and the conquest made Alfonso renowned throughout the Christian world. However, this "conquest" was conducted rather gradually, and mostly peacefully, during the course of several decades. However, Toledo was not fully secured and integrated into Alfonso's kingdom until after a period of gradual resettlement and consolidation, during which Christian settlers were encouraged to move into the area.

Alfonso VI was first and foremost a tactful monarch who chose to understand the kings of taifa and employed unprecedented diplomatic measures to attain political feats before considering the use of force. He adopted the title Imperator totius Hispaniae ("Emperor of all Hispania", referring to all the Christian kingdoms of the Iberian Peninsula, and not just the modern country of Spain). Alfonso's more aggressive policy towards the taifas worried the rulers of those kingdoms, who called on the African Almoravids for help.

=== Kingdom of Pamplona / Kingdom of Navarre (824–1620) ===
The Kingdom of Pamplona primarily extended along either side of the Pyrenees on the Atlantic Ocean. The kingdom was formed when local leader Íñigo Arista led a revolt against the regional Frankish authority and was elected or declared King in Pamplona (traditionally in 824), establishing a kingdom inextricably linked at this stage to their kinsmen, the muwallad Banu Qasi of Tudela.

Although relatively weak until the early 11th century, Pamplona took a more active role after the accession of Sancho the Great (1004–1035). The kingdom expanded greatly under his reign, as it absorbed Castile, Leon, and what was to be Aragon, in addition to other small counties that would unite and become the Principality of Catalonia. This expansion also led to the independence of Galicia, as well as gaining overlordship over Gascony.

In the 12th century, however, the kingdom contracted to its core, and in 1162 King Sancho VI declared himself king of Navarre. Throughout its early history, the Navarrese kingdom engaged in frequent skirmishes with the Carolingian Empire, from which it maintained its independence, a key feature of its history until 1513.

=== Kingdom and Crown of Aragon (1035–1706) ===
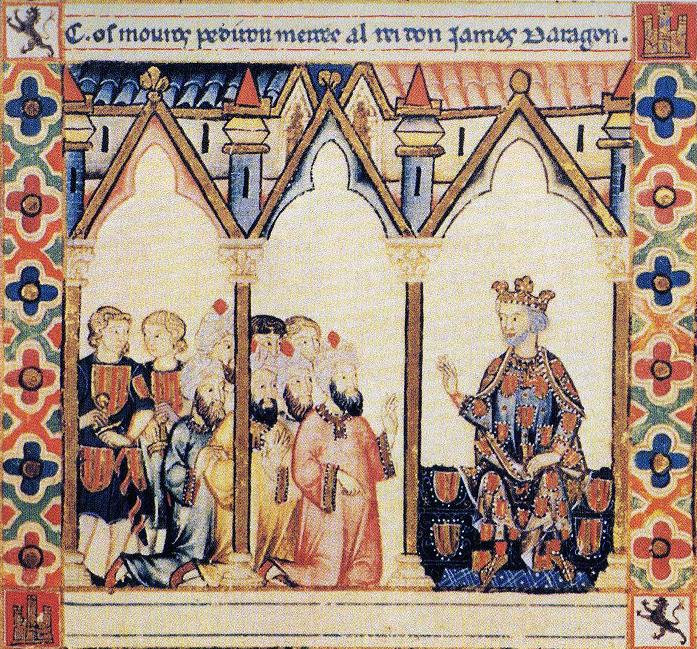
The Moors request permission from James I of Aragon

The Kingdom of Aragon started off as an offshoot of the Kingdom of Navarre. It was formed when Sancho III of Navarre decided to divide his large realm among all his sons. Aragon was the portion of the realm which passed to Ramiro I of Aragon, an illegitimate son of Sancho III. The kingdoms of Aragon and Navarre were several times united in personal union until the death of Alfonso the Battler in 1135.

In 1137, the heiress of the kingdom married the count of Barcelona, and their son Alfonso II ruled from 1162 the combined possessions of his parents, resulting in the composite monarchy that modern historians call the Crown of Aragon. Alfonso successfully reincorporated the Principality of Tarragona into their realm, expelling the Norman d'Aguiló family.

In the following centuries, the Crown of Aragon conquered a number of territories in the Iberian peninsula and the Mediterranean, including the kingdom of Valencia and the kingdom of Mallorca. James I of Aragon, also known as James the Conqueror, expanded his territories to the north, south and east. James also signed the Treaty of Corbeil (1258), in which the French king renounced to any feudal claim over Catalonia.

Early in his reign, James attempted to reunite the Aragonese and Navarrese crowns through a treaty with the childless Sancho VII of Navarre. But the Navarrese nobles rejected him, and chose Theobald IV of Champagne in his stead.

Later on, Ferdinand II of Aragon, married Isabella of Castile, leading to a dynastic union which eventually gave birth to modern Spain, after the conquest of Upper Navarre (Navarre south of the Pyrenees) and the Emirate of Granada.

=== Kingdom of Portugal (1139–1249) ===
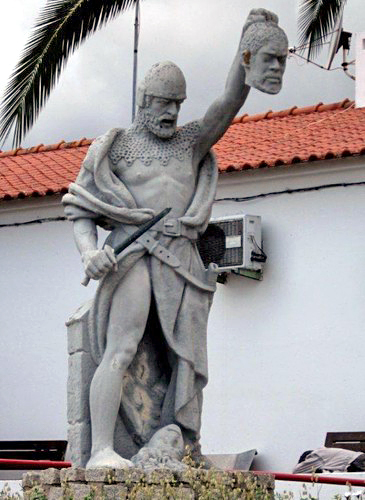
Statue of Geraldo Geraldes Sem Pavor or Gerald the Fearless. A Portuguese folk hero with the head of a Moor

In 1139, after an overwhelming victory in the Battle of Ourique against the Almoravids, Afonso Henriques was proclaimed the first King of Portugal by his troops. According to the legend, Christ announced from heaven Afonso's great deeds, whereby he would establish the first Portuguese Cortes at Lamego and be crowned by the Primate Archbishop of Braga. In 1142 a group of Anglo-Norman crusaders on their way to the Holy Land helped King Afonso Henriques in a failed Siege of Lisbon (1142). In the Treaty of Zamora in 1143, Alfonso VII of Leon and Castile recognized Portuguese independence from the Kingdom of León.

In 1147, Portugal captured Santarém, and seven months later the city of Lisbon was also brought under Portuguese control after the Siege of Lisbon. By the papal bull Manifestis Probatum, Pope Alexander III recognized Afonso Henriques as King of Portugal in 1179.

With Portugal finally recognized as an independent kingdom by its neighbors, Afonso Henriques and his successors, aided by Crusaders and the military monastic orders the Knights Templar, the Order of Aviz or the Order of Saint James, pushed the Moors to the Algarve on the southern coast of Portugal. After several campaigns, the Portuguese part in the Reconquista came to an end with the definitive capture of the Algarve in 1249. With all of Portugal now under the control of Afonso III of Portugal, religious, cultural and ethnic groups became gradually homogenized.

Cross of the Order of Christ

After the completion of the Reconquista, the Portuguese territory was a Roman Catholic realm. Nonetheless, Denis of Portugal carried out a short war with Castile for possession of the towns of Serpa and Moura. After this, Denis avoided war. In 1297, he signed the Treaty of Alcanizes with Ferdinand IV of Castile, establishing a permanent border between the two kingdoms.

During the suppression of the Knights Templar all over Europe, under the influence of Philip IV of France and Pope Clement V requesting its annihilation by 1312, King Denis reinstituted the Templars of Tomar as the Order of Christ in 1319. Denis believed that the Order's assets should by their nature stay in any given Order instead of being taken by the King, largely for the Templars' contribution to the Reconquista and the reconstruction of Portugal after the wars.

The experience gained during the battles of the Reconquista was fundamental to Conquest of Ceuta, the first step to the establishment of the Portuguese Empire. Likewise, the contact with Muslim's navigation techniques and sciences enabled the creation of Portuguese nautical innovations such as the caravel – the principal Portuguese ship during their voyages of exploration in the Age of Discovery.

=== Minor Christian realms ===
Minor Christian realms were the Kingdom of Viguera (970–1005), the Lordship of Albarracín (1167–1300), the Principality of Tarragona (1129–1173), and the Principality of Valencia (1094–1102).

== Southern Islamic realms ==
=== Umayyads ===
During the 9th century the Berbers returned to North Africa in the aftermath of revolts. Many governors of large cities distant from the capital, Córdoba, had planned to establish their independence. Then, in 929, the Emir of Córdoba (Abd-ar-Rahman III), the leader of the Umayyad dynasty, declared himself Caliph, independent from the Abbasids in Baghdad. He took all the military, religious, and political power and reorganised the army and the bureaucracy.

After regaining control over the dissident governors, Abd-ar-Rahman III tried to conquer the remaining Christian kingdoms of the Iberian peninsula, attacking them several times and forcing them back beyond the Cantabrian Mountains. Abd-ar-Rahman's grandson later became a puppet in the hands of the great Vizier Almanzor (al-Mansur, "the victorious"). Almanzor waged several campaigns attacking and sacking Burgos, Leon, Pamplona, Barcelona, and Santiago de Compostela before his death in 1002.

=== Taifas ===
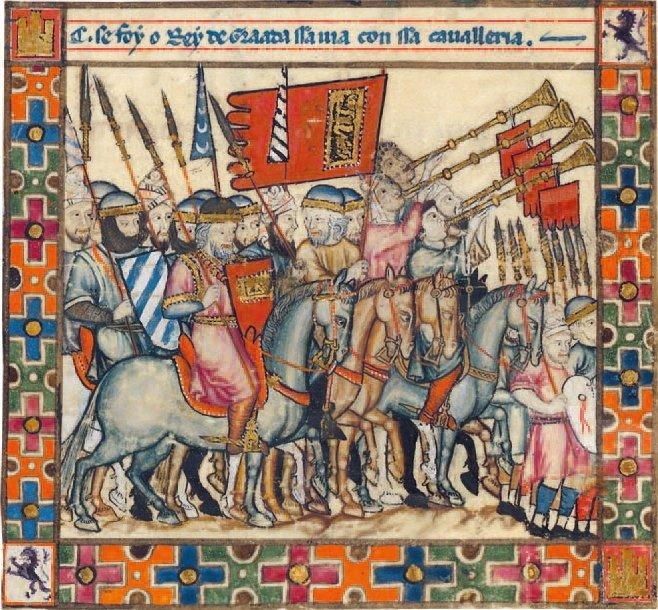
Depiction of the Moors in Iberia, from The Cantigas de Santa Maria

Between Almanzor's death and 1031, al-Andalus suffered many civil wars, which ended in the division into the taifa kingdoms. The taifas were small kingdoms, established by the city governors. The result was many (up to 34) small kingdoms, each centered upon its capital. Their governors had no larger-scale vision of the Moorish presence in the Iberian peninsula and had no qualms about attacking their neighbouring kingdoms whenever they could gain advantage by doing so.

The split into the taifa states weakened the Islamic presence, and the Christian kingdoms further advanced as Alfonso VI of Leon and Castile conquered Toledo in 1085. Surrounded by enemies, taifa rulers sent a desperate appeal to the Berber chieftain Yusuf ibn Tashfin, leader of the Almoravids. Taifas reemerged when the Almoravid dynasty collapsed in the 1140s, and again when the Almohad Caliphate declined in the 1220s.

=== Almoravids ===
Extent of the Reconquista into Almohad territory as of 1157

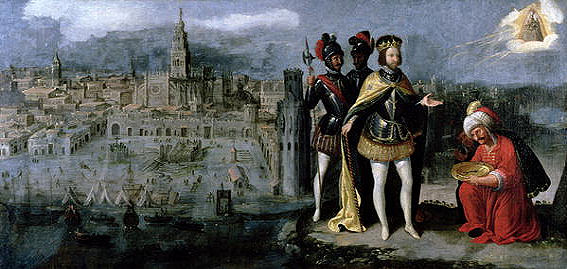
Capture of Seville by Ferdinand III of Castile (painted by Francisco Pacheco)

The Almoravids were a Muslim militia composed of Berbers, and unlike previous Muslim rulers, they were not so tolerant towards Christians and Jews. Their armies entered the Iberian peninsula on several occasions (1086, 1088, 1093) and defeated King Alfonso at the Battle of Sagrajas in 1086, but initially their purpose was to unite all the taifas into a single Almoravid Caliphate. Their actions halted the southward expansion of the Christian kingdoms. Their only defeat came at Valencia in 1094, due to the actions of El Cid.

Meanwhile, Navarre lost all importance under King Sancho IV, for he lost Rioja to Sancho II of Castile, and nearly became the vassal of Aragon. At his death, the Navarrese chose as their king Sancho Ramírez, King of Aragon, who thus became Sancho V of Navarre and I of Aragon. Sancho Ramírez gained international recognition for Aragon, uniting it with Navarre and expanding the borders south, conquering Wasqa^{t} Huesca deep in the valleys in 1096 and building a fort, El Castellar, 25 km from Saraqusta^{t} Zaragoza.

Catalonia came under intense pressure from the taifas of Zaragoza and Lérida, as well as from internal disputes, as Barcelona suffered a dynastic crisis that led to open war among the smaller counties. But by the 1080s, the situation had calmed down, and the dominion of Barcelona over the smaller counties was restored.

=== Almohads ===
After a brief period of disintegration (the second Taifa period), the Almohads, the rising power in North Africa, took over most of al-Andalus. However they were decisively defeated at the Battle of Las Navas de Tolosa (1212) by a Christian coalition, losing almost all the remaining lands of al-Andalus in the following decades. By 1252 only the Emirate of Granada remained intact but as a vassal state of Castile.

=== Granada War and the end of Muslim rule ===
Ferdinand and Isabella completed the Reconquista with a war against the Emirate of Granada that started in 1482 and ended with Granada's surrender on 2 January 1492. The Moors in Castile previously numbered "half a million within the realm". By 1492 some 100,000 had died or been enslaved, 200,000 had emigrated, and 200,000 remained in Castile. Many of the Muslim elite, including Granada's former Emir Muhammad XI, who had been given the area of the Alpujarras mountains as a principality, found life under Christian rule intolerable and emigrated to Fez in North Africa.

In 1497, Spanish forces took Melilla, west of Oran, and the island of Djerba, south of Tunis, and went on to more important gains, with the bloody seizure of Oran in 1509, and the capture of Bougie and Tripoli in 1510. The Spanish capture of Tripoli cost them some 300 men, while the inhabitants suffered between 3,000 and 5,000 killed and another 5,000–6,000 carried off as slaves. Soon thereafter, however, they faced competition from the rapidly expanding Ottoman Empire in the east and were pushed back.

== Infighting ==
=== Christian infighting ===
Clashes and raids on bordering Andalusian lands did not keep the Christian kingdoms from battling among themselves or allying with Muslim kings. Some Muslim kings had Christian-born wives or mothers. Some Christian mercenaries, like El Cid, were contracted by taifa kings to fight against their neighbours. Indeed, El Cid's first battle experience was gained fighting for a Muslim state against a Christian state. At the Battle of Graus in 1063, he and other Castilians fought on the side of al-Muqtadir, Muslim sultan of Zaragoza, against the forces of Ramiro I of Aragon. There is even an instance of a crusade being declared against another Christian king in Hispania. Although Christian rulers Fernán González of Castile and Ramiro II of León had cooperated to defeat the Muslims at the Battle of Simancas (939), Fernán attacked Ramiro soon after and the Leonese–Castilian war that followed lasted until Ramiro's victory in 944. Ramiro II's death caused the war of the Leonese succession (951–956) between his sons, and the winner Ordoño III of León concluded peace with caliph Abd al-Rahman III of Córdoba.

A map of Christian realms in the north and Islamic taifas in the south (1037). During the Reconquista, the Iberian states not only fought along religious lines, but also amongst themselves and internally, especially during wars of succession and clan feuds.

After the defeat of Alfonso VIII, King of Castile, at Alarcos, Kings Alfonso IX of Leon and Sancho VII of Navarre entered an alliance with the Almohads and invaded Castile in 1196. By the end of the year Sancho VII had dropped out of the war under Papal pressure. Early in 1197, at the request of Sancho I, King of Portugal, Pope Celestine III declared a crusade against Alfonso IX and released his subjects from their responsibilities to the king, declaring that "the men of his realm shall be absolved from their fidelity and his dominion by authority of the apostolic see." Together the Kings of Portugal, Castile, and Aragon invaded Leon. In the face of this onslaught combined with pressure from the Pope, Alfonso IX was finally forced to sue for peace in October 1197.

In the late years of al-Andalus, Castile had the might to conquer the remnants of the kingdom of Granada, but the kings preferred to wait and claim the tribute of the Muslim parias. The trade of Granadan goods and the parias were a major means by which African gold entered medieval Europe.

=== Muslim infighting ===
Similarly, there was frequent Muslim infighting throughout the existence of al-Andalus. The Abbasid Revolution (747–750) divided Muslim rulers in Iberia into the pro-Abbasid Caliphate faction (based in Baghdad) and the pro-Umayyad faction (reconstituted as the Emirate of Córdoba). Charlemagne's failed 778 campaign into Iberia was prompted by the invitation of the pro-Abbasid governor of Barcelona, Sulayman al-Arabi, which led to a brief Abbasid-Carolingian Alliance against the Umayyads. During the Fitna of al-Andalus (1009–1031), the Umayyad-run Caliphate of Córdoba fell apart into rival taifas headed by Islamic emirs warring each other. After the Christian king of Castile and León conquered Toledo in 1085, the emirs requested Yusuf ibn Tashfin, leader of the strict Islamic Almoravid sect, to come to their defence, which he did at the Battle of Sagrajas (1086). However, Yusuf soon turned on the Muslim emirs of Spain, defeating them all and conquering their lands by 1091. A similar scenario occurred in 1147–1157, when the Almoravid dynasty fell, a Second Taifas period happened, and the Muslim-controlled cities of al-Andalus were conquered by the new Almohad Caliphate. The War of the Granada succession (1482–1492) took place after the deposition of emir Abu'l-Hasan Ali of Granada by his son Muhammad XI of Granada; the deposed emir's brother Muhammad XII of Granada also joined the fight. This succession conflict took place simultaneously with the Granada War, and was ended only by the Castilian conquest in 1492.

== Christian repopulation ==
The Reconquista was a process not only of war and conquest, but also of repopulation. Christian kings moved their own people to locations abandoned by Muslims in order to have a population capable of defending the borders. The main repopulation areas were the Douro Basin (the northern plateau), the high Ebro valley (La Rioja) and central Catalonia. The repopulation of the Douro Basin took place in two distinct phases. North of the river, between the 9th and 10th centuries, the "pressure" (or presura) system was employed. South of the Douro, in the 10th and 11th centuries, the presura led to the "charters" (forais or fueros). Fueros were used even south of the Central Range.

The presura was a system by which peasants settled and cultivated abandoned lands, particularly in the Douro Basin, during the early Middle Ages. Under Asturian law, individuals could claim ownership of land they were able to work and defend. Minor nobles and clergy from regions such as Asturias and Galicia also organized expeditions with dependent peasants, contributing to the development of more feudalized areas like León and Portugal. In contrast, Castile, characterized by its harsher climate and sparse population, developed with a larger proportion of free peasants and less feudal structure. Similar practices occurred in Catalonia, where authorities promoted the repopulation of plains such as those around Vic, Barcelona.

During the 10th century and onwards, cities and towns gained more importance and power, as commerce reappeared and the population kept growing. Fueros were charters documenting the privileges and usages given to all the people repopulating a town. The fueros provided a means of escape from the feudal system, as fueros were only granted by the monarch. As a result, the town council was dependent on the monarch alone and, in turn, was required to provide auxilium—aid or troops—for their monarch. The military force of the towns became the caballeros villanos. The first fuero was given by count Fernán González to the inhabitants of Castrojeriz in the 940's. The most important towns of medieval Hispania had fueros, or forais. In Navarre, fueros were the main repopulating system. Later on, in the 12th century, Aragon also employed the system; for example, the fuero of Teruel, which was one of the last fueros, in the early 13th century.

From the mid-13th century on, no more charters were granted, as the demographic pressure had disappeared and other means of re-population were created. Fueros remained as city charters until the 18th century in Aragon, Valencia and Catalonia and until the 19th century in Castile and Navarre. Fueros had an immense importance for those living under them, who were prepared to go to war to defend their rights under the charter. In the 19th century, the abolition of the fueros in Navarre would be one of the causes of the Carlist Wars. In Castile, disputes over the system contributed to the war against Charles I (Castilian War of the Communities).

== Christian military culture ==
=== Non-religious motives ===
Territories of the military orders of the Iberian kingdoms towards the end of 15th century

Jim Bradbury (2004) noted that the Christian belligerents in the Reconquista were not all equally motivated by religion, and that a distinction should be made between 'secular rulers' on the one hand, and on the other hand Christian military orders which came from elsewhere (including the three main orders of Knights Templar, Knights Hospitaller and Teutonic Knights), or were established inside Iberia (such as those of Santiago, Alcántara and Calatrava). '[The Knights] were more committed to religious war than some of their secular counterparts, were opposed to treating with Muslims and carried out raids and even atrocities, such as decapitating Muslim prisoners.'

On the other hand, Christian armies sometimes forged temporary alliances with Islamic emirs, and Christian mercenaries were quite willing to fight for Arab and Berber rulers if the price was right. El Cid is a well-known example of a Christian mercenary leader who was in paid military service of the Islamic kings of Zaragoza for years. Mercenaries were an important factor, as many kings did not have enough soldiers available. Norsemen, Flemish spearmen, Frankish knights, Moorish mounted archers (archers who travelled on horseback), and Berber light cavalry were the main types of mercenaries available and used in the conflict.

=== Christian cavalry and infantry ===
Medieval Christian armies mainly comprised two types of forces: the cavalry (mostly nobles, but including commoner knights from the 10th century on) and the infantry, or peones (peasants). Infantry only went to war if needed, which was not frequent. In an atmosphere of constant conflict, warfare and daily life were strongly intertwined during this period. These armies reflected the need for society to be on constant alert during the first chapters of the Reconquista. These forces were capable of moving long distances in short times.

Coat of arms of Alcanadre. La Rioja, Spain, depicting heads of slain Moors

Cavalry tactics in Hispania involved knights approaching the enemy, throwing javelins, then withdrawing to a safe distance before commencing another assault. Once the enemy formation was sufficiently weakened, the knights charged with thrusting spears (lances did not arrive in Hispania until the 11th century). There were three types of knights (caballeros): royal knights, noble knights (caballeros hidalgos), and commoner knights (caballeros villanos, or "mounted soldier from a villa"). Royal knights were mainly nobles with a close relationship with the king, and thus claimed a direct Gothic inheritance.

Royal knights in the early stages of the Reconquista were equipped with mail hauberk, kite shield, a long sword (designed to fight from the horse), javelins, spears and an axe. Noble knights came from the ranks of the infanzones or lower nobles, whereas the commoner knights were not noble but were wealthy enough to afford a horse. Uniquely in Europe, these horsemen comprised a militia cavalry force with no feudal links, being under the sole control of the king or the count of Castile because of fueros (charters) with the crown. Both noble and common knights wore padded armour and carried javelins, spears and round-tasselled shield (influenced by Moorish shields), as well as a sword.

The peones were peasants who went to battle in service of their feudal lord. Poorly equipped, with bows and arrows, spears and short swords, they were mainly used as auxiliary troops. Their function in battle was to contain the enemy troops until the cavalry arrived and to block the enemy infantry from charging the knights. The longbow, the composite bow, and the crossbow were the basic types of bows and were especially popular in the infantry.

=== Equipment ===
In the early Middle Ages in Hispania, armour was typically made of leather, with iron scales. Head protections consisted of a round helmet with nose protector (influenced by the designs used by Vikings, who attacked during the 8th and 9th centuries) and a chain mail headpiece. Shields were often round or kidney-shaped, except for the kite-shaped designs used by the royal knights. Usually adorned with geometric designs, crosses or tassels, shields were made out of wood and had a leather cover.

Steel swords were the most common weapon. The cavalry used long double-edged swords and the infantry short, single-edged ones. Guards were either semicircular or straight, but always highly ornamented with geometrical patterns. Spears and javelins were up to 1.5 metres long and had an iron tip. The double-axe—made of iron, 30 cm long, and possessing an extremely sharp edge—was designed to be equally useful as a thrown weapon or in close combat. Maces and hammers were not common, but some specimens have remained and are thought to have been used by members of the cavalry.

=== Technological changes ===
This style of warfare remained dominant in the Iberian Peninsula until the late 11th century, when lance tactics entered from France, although the traditional horse javelin-shot techniques continued to be used. In the 12th and 13th centuries, soldiers typically carried a sword, a lance, a javelin, and either bow and arrows or crossbow and darts/bolts. Armor consisted of a coat of mail over a quilted jacket, extending at least to the knees, a helmet or iron cap, and bracers protecting the arms and thighs, either metal or leather.

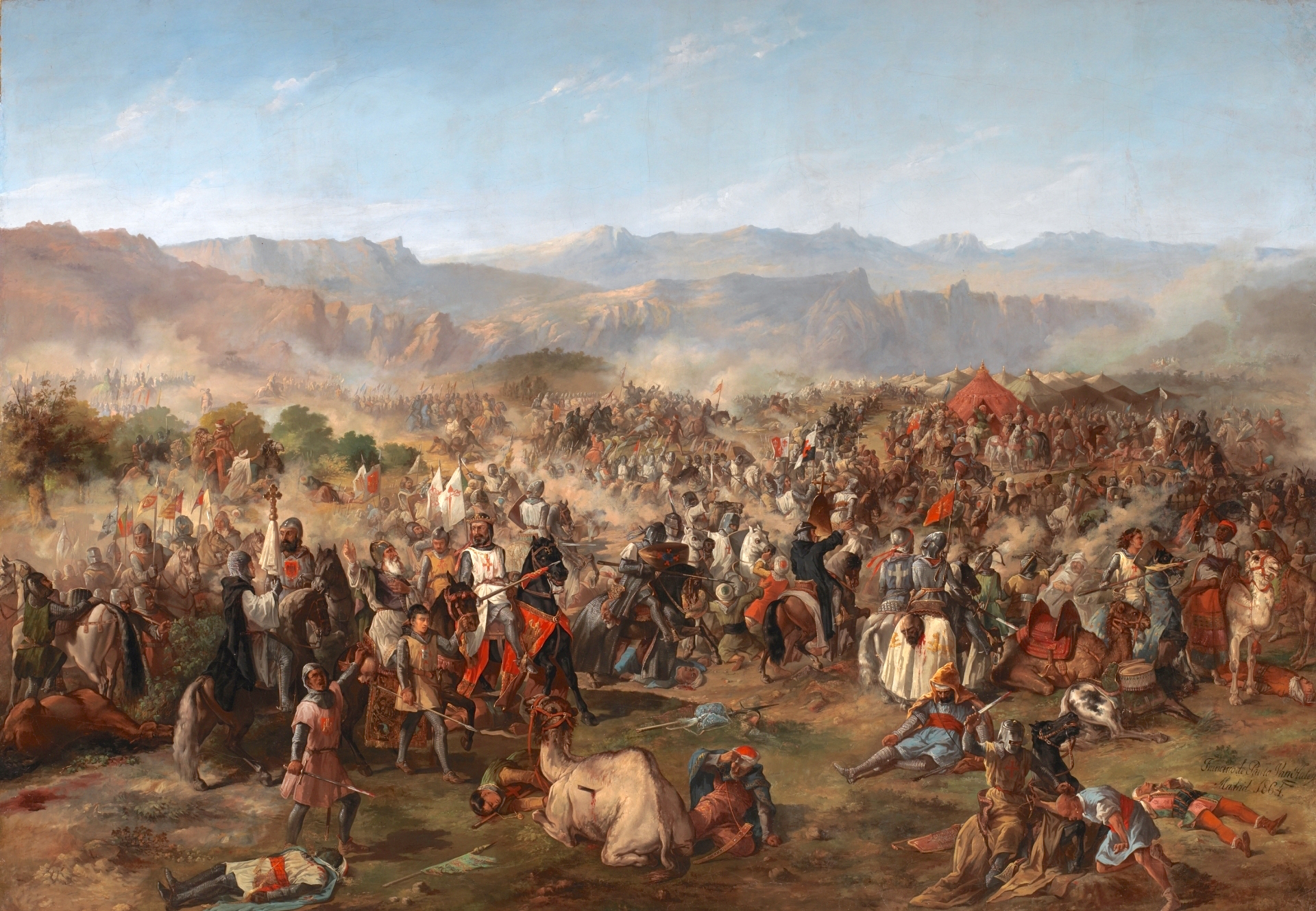
The Battle of Las Navas de Tolosa (1212), an important turning point of the Reconquista

Shields were round or triangular, made of wood, covered with leather, and protected by an iron band; the shields of knights and nobles would bear the family's coat of arms. Knights rode in both the Muslim style, a la jineta (i.e. the equivalent of a modern jockey's seat), a short stirrup strap and bended knees allowed for better control and speed, or in the French style, a la brida, a long stirrup strap allowed for more security in the saddle (i.e. the equivalent of the modern cavalry seat, which is more secure) when acting as heavy cavalry. Horses were occasionally fitted with a coat of mail as well.

Around the 14th and 15th centuries heavy cavalry gained a predominant role, including knights wearing full plate armor.

== Conversions and expulsions ==
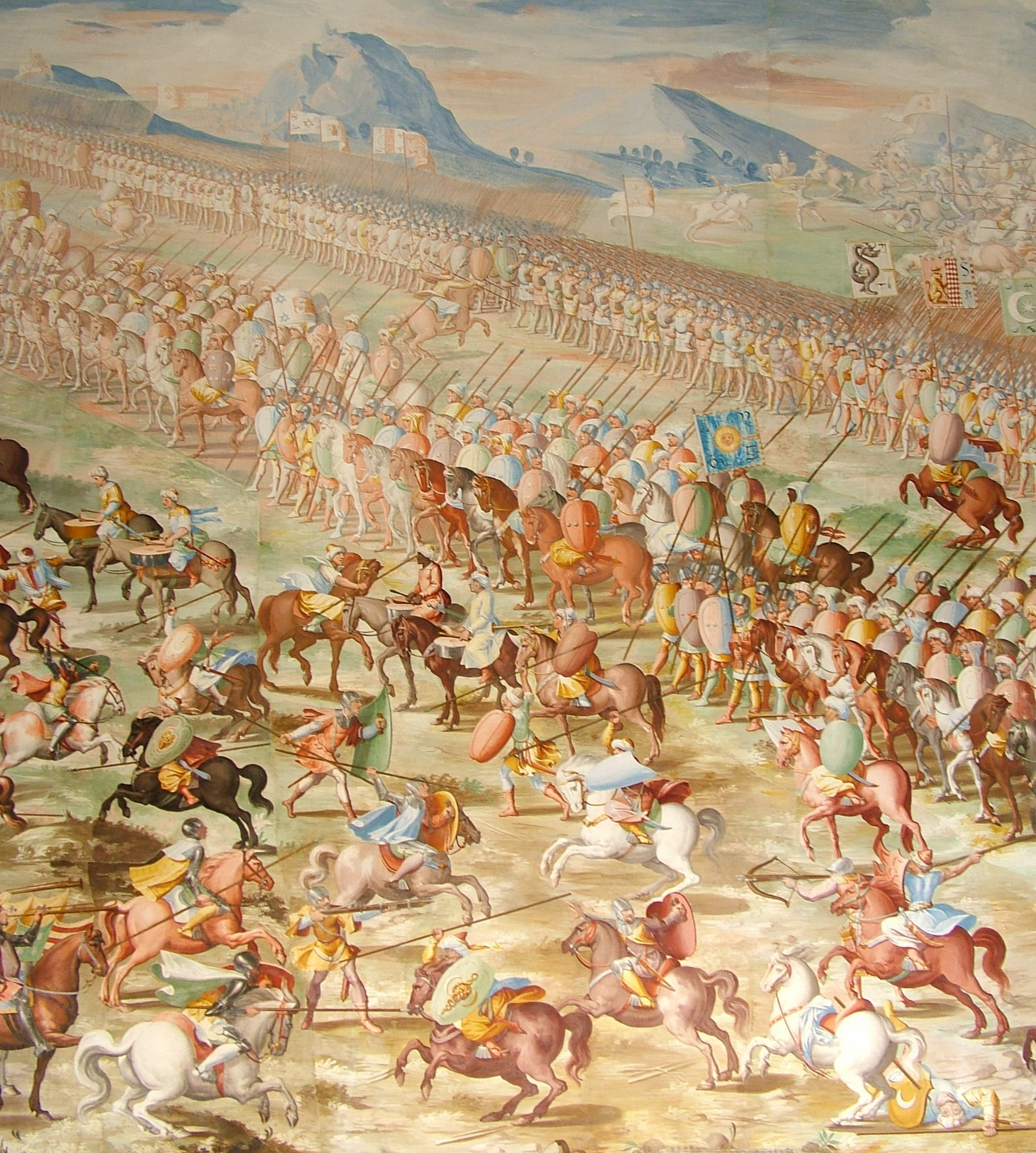
Forces of Muhammed IX, Nasrid Sultan of Granada, at the Battle of La Higueruela, 1431

The new Christian hierarchy demanded heavy taxes from non-Christians and gave them rights, such as in the Treaty of Granada (1491) only for Moors in recently Islamic Granada. On 30 July 1492, all the Jewish community—some 200,000 people—were forcibly expelled. The next year, the Alhambra decree ordered the expulsion of practicing Jews, leading many of them to convert to Catholicism. In 1502, Queen Isabella I declared that conversion to Catholicism was compulsory within the Kingdom of Castile. Holy Roman Emperor Charles V imposed the same religious requirement on Moors in the Kingdom of Aragon in 1526, forcing its Muslim population to convert during the Revolt of the Germanies.

=== Spanish Inquisition ===
Making things more complex were the many former Muslims and Jews known as Moriscos, Marranos, and Conversos, who shared ancestors in common with many Christians, especially among the aristocracy, causing much concern over loyalty and attempts by the aristocracy to hide their non-Christian ancestry. Some—the numbers are debated—continued to secretly practice their religions and use their languages well into the sixteenth century. Those that the Spanish Inquisition found to be secretly practicing Islam or Judaism were executed, imprisoned, or exiled.

Nevertheless, all those deemed to be "New Christians" were repeatedly suspected of various crimes against the Spanish state, including continued practice of Islam or Judaism. New Christians were subject to many discriminatory practices starting in the sixteenth century.

== Classifications and later consequences ==
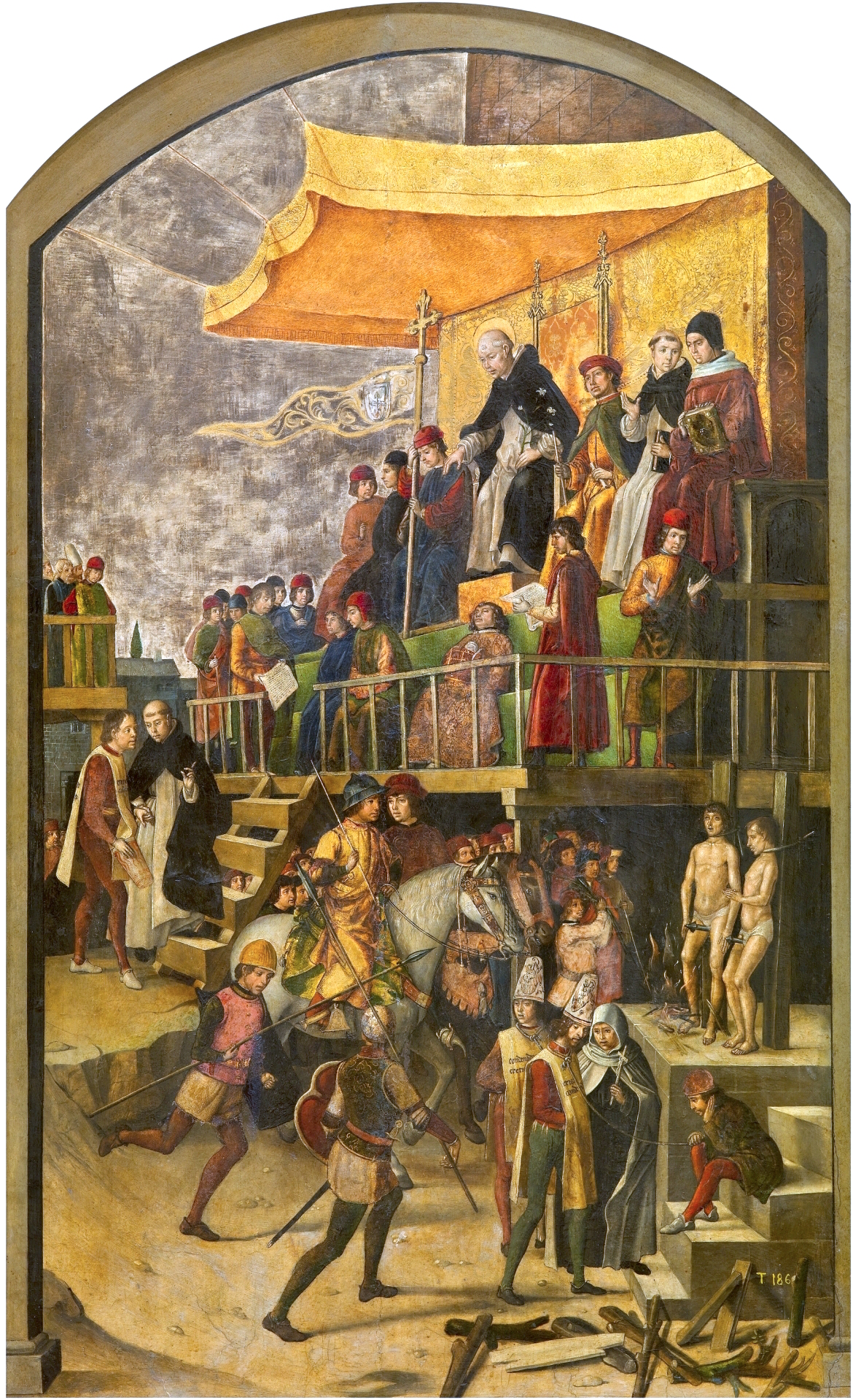
Saint Dominic presiding over an auto-da-fé, by Pedro Berruguete (around 1495)

The many advances and retreats created several social types:

- The Muwallad: native Iberians under Islamic rule who converted to Islam after the arrival of the Muslim Arabs and Berbers.
- The Mozarabs: Christians in Muslim-held lands. Some of them migrated to the north of the peninsula in times of persecution bringing elements of the styles, food and agricultural practices learned from the Andalusians, while they continued practicing their Christianity with older forms of Catholic worship and their own versions of the Latin language.
- "New Christians": Jews converting to Christianity called conversos, or pejoratively Marranos. Jews converted to Christianity voluntarily or through force. Some were Crypto-Jews who continued practicing Judaism secretly. All remaining Jews were expelled from Spain as a consequence of the 1492 Alhambra Decree, and from Portugal in 1497. Former Jews were subject to the Spanish and Portuguese Inquisitions, established to enforce Christian faith and practice, which often resulted in secret investigations and public punishments of conversos in autos-da-fé ("acts of faith"), often public executions by burning the victim alive
- The Mudéjar: Muslims in Christian-held lands.
- Moriscos: Muslim conversos. Muslims who converted to Catholicism. A significant number were Crypto-Muslims who continued practicing Islam secretly. They ranged from successful skilled artisans, valued and protected in Aragon, to impoverished peasants in Castile. After the Alhambra Decree the entire Islamic population was forced to convert or leave, and at the beginning of the seventeenth century a significant number were expelled in the expulsion of the Moriscos.

== Legacy ==
Since the 19th century, traditional Western and especially Iberian historiography has stressed the existence of the Reconquista, a continual phenomenon by which the Christian Iberian kingdoms opposed and conquered the Muslim kingdoms, understood as a common enemy who had militarily seized territory from native Iberian Christians. However, modern scholarship has challenged this concept of a "reconquista" as a national myth tied to Spanish nationalism. The concept has served the idea "that Spain is a nation shaped against Islam", contributing to "a largely biased and distorted vision of the Iberian medieval past, aimed at delegitimizing the Islamic presence (al-Andalus) and therefore at legitimizing the Christian conquest of the Muslim territory." Among other arguments, one of those advanced by scholars is that "no military campaign lasts eight centuries." The term "reconquista" in this sense first appeared in the 19th century, and only entered the dictionary of the Royal Spanish Academy in 1936, with the rise of Francisco Franco. The concept of the reconquista continues to have significance and has even experienced a resurgence in modern politics—especially for the extreme right Spanish party Vox, but also more broadly among xenophobic and especially Islamophobic conservatives in the West, with the influence of the doctrine of a "Clash of Civilizations".

The popular hero El Cid, whose name is highly associated with the Reconquista, at one part in his career fought for the Muslim rulers of Zaragoza, whom he defended from its traditional enemy, the Christian Aragon. The most important achievement of El Cid's career, the conquest of the kingdom-city of Valencia, was actually achieved in close alliance with the Banu Hud and other Muslim dynasties opposed to the Almoravids.

=== French emulation ===
In 1558, the armies of King Henry II of France managed to conquer the city of Calais, which had been under English rule for centuries. Queen Mary I of England considered the loss of Calais as the greatest disaster of her reign. The region around Calais, then-known as the Calaisis, was renamed the Pays Reconquis ("Reconquered Country") in commemoration of its recovery by the French.

=== Festivals in modern Spain and Portugal ===
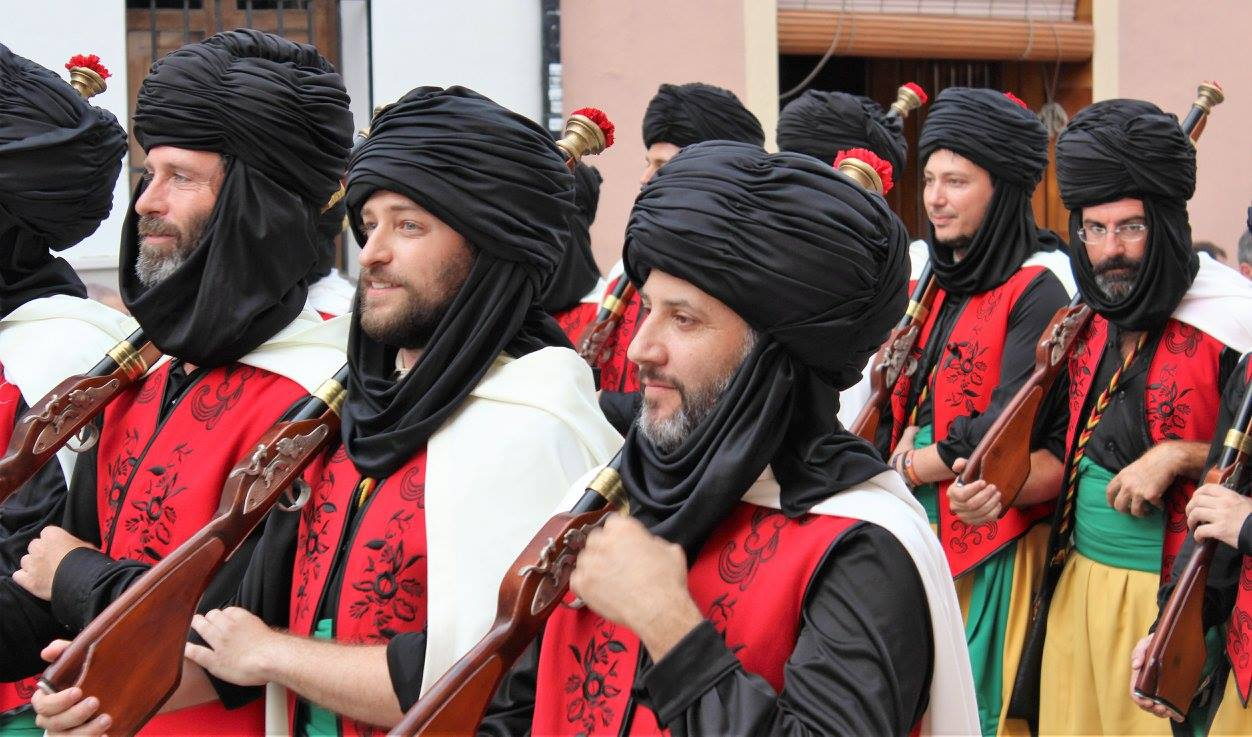
Moros y Cristianos festival in Pego, Alicante, 2016

Currently, festivals called moros y cristianos (Spanish), moros i cristians (Catalan), mouros e cristãos (Portuguese) and mouros e cristiáns (Galician), which all mean "Moors and Christians", recreate the fights as colorful parades with elaborate garments and many fireworks, especially on the central and southern towns of the Land of Valencia, like Alcoi, Ontinyent or Villena.

=== Persistent effects ===
A 2016 study found that the "rate of Reconquest"—how rapidly the Christian frontier was expanded—has persistent effects on the Spanish economy to this day. After an initial phase of military conquest, Christians states incorporated the conquered land. When large frontier regions were incorporated at once, the land was mostly given to the nobility and the military orders, with negative effects on long-term development. The incorporation of small regions, on the other hand, generally allowed for the participation of individual settlers and was more likely to fall under the auspices of the crown. This led to a more equitable distribution of land and greater social equality, with positive effects on long-term development.

=== Reverberations ===
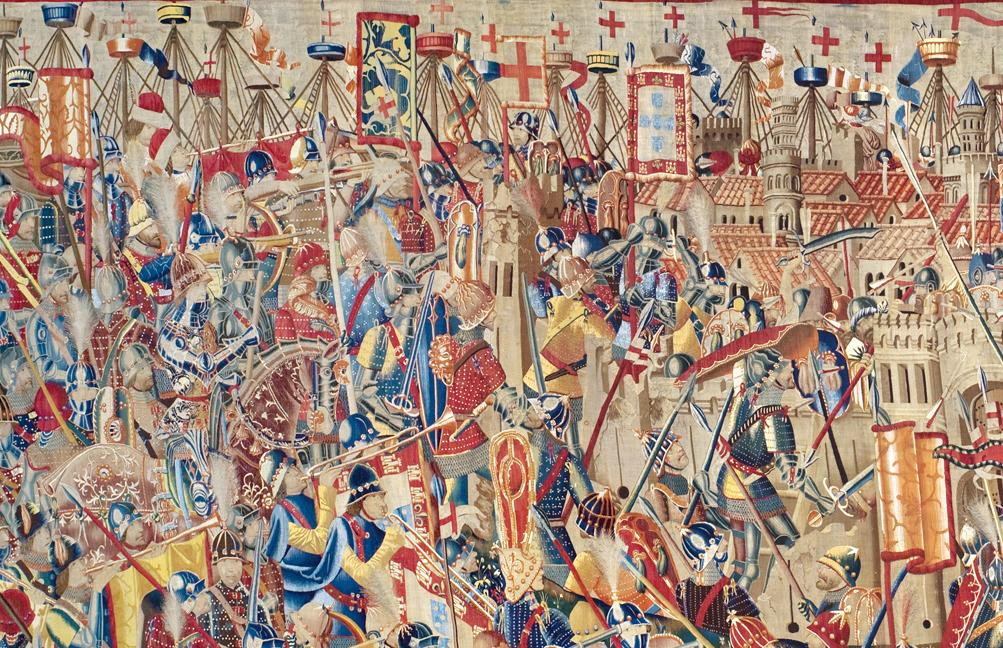
The Portuguese forces, personally commanded by King Afonso V, in the conquest of Asilah, Morocco, 1471, from the Pastrana Tapestries

As the Christian kingdoms completed their conquest of territory on the Iberian Peninsula, they shifted their impetus elsewhere, even to the Maghreb, which is located across the Strait of Gibraltar. A Castilian Crown-sanctioned punitive expedition against Tetouan, a corsair stronghold, was launched as early as 1399–1400. The conquest of Ceuta in 1415 marked the beginning of Portuguese expansion in Africa. Thereby, it allowed Portugal to exert control over Castilian and Aragonese trade through the Strait, and it also allowed Portugal to establish a powerbase for the launching of raid expeditions in Muslim-ruled lands. Some 15th-century political writers promoted the idea of a "Gothic Monarchy", an heir to Rome, that included territory across the Strait.

The African enterprise which was undertaken during the rule of the Catholic Monarchs was nominally endorsed by papal bulls and it was also financed with donations which were used to pay the crusade tax, even if it was viewed with some suspicion by the Papacy. Conquest efforts in Africa on the part of the Catholic Monarchy by and large stalled following the death of Ferdinand II of Aragon. The model of conquest and repopulation by Christian powers in the Peninsula was however never reproduced in Northern Africa, and with the conquered territory—a fortified mark with very few fortresses scattered along an extensive coastline—merely adopting a defensive role, it allowed for Ottoman expansion in the region.

The Portuguese warred with the Ottoman Caliphate in the Mediterranean, Indian Ocean and Southeast Asia as the Portuguese conquered the Ottomans' allies: the Sultanate of Adal in East Africa, the Sultanate of Delhi in South Asia and the Sultanate of Malacca in Southeast Asia.

Christopher Columbus's initial 1492 voyage to the Americas was predicated on the completion of the Granada War, with the Spanish monarchy only able to assent to his overseas journeys once it had completed the process of defeating the Moors. Columbus's views of the New World and the Christian convictions that shaped his actions there were influenced by historical European anti-Muslim ideas that had underpinned the Reconquista itself; he believed that by his voyaging, he would be able to reach the Grand Khan of Asia and create a coalition that could attack the Middle East from both sides and thus bring Jerusalem back under Christian rule.

=== Far-right motif ===
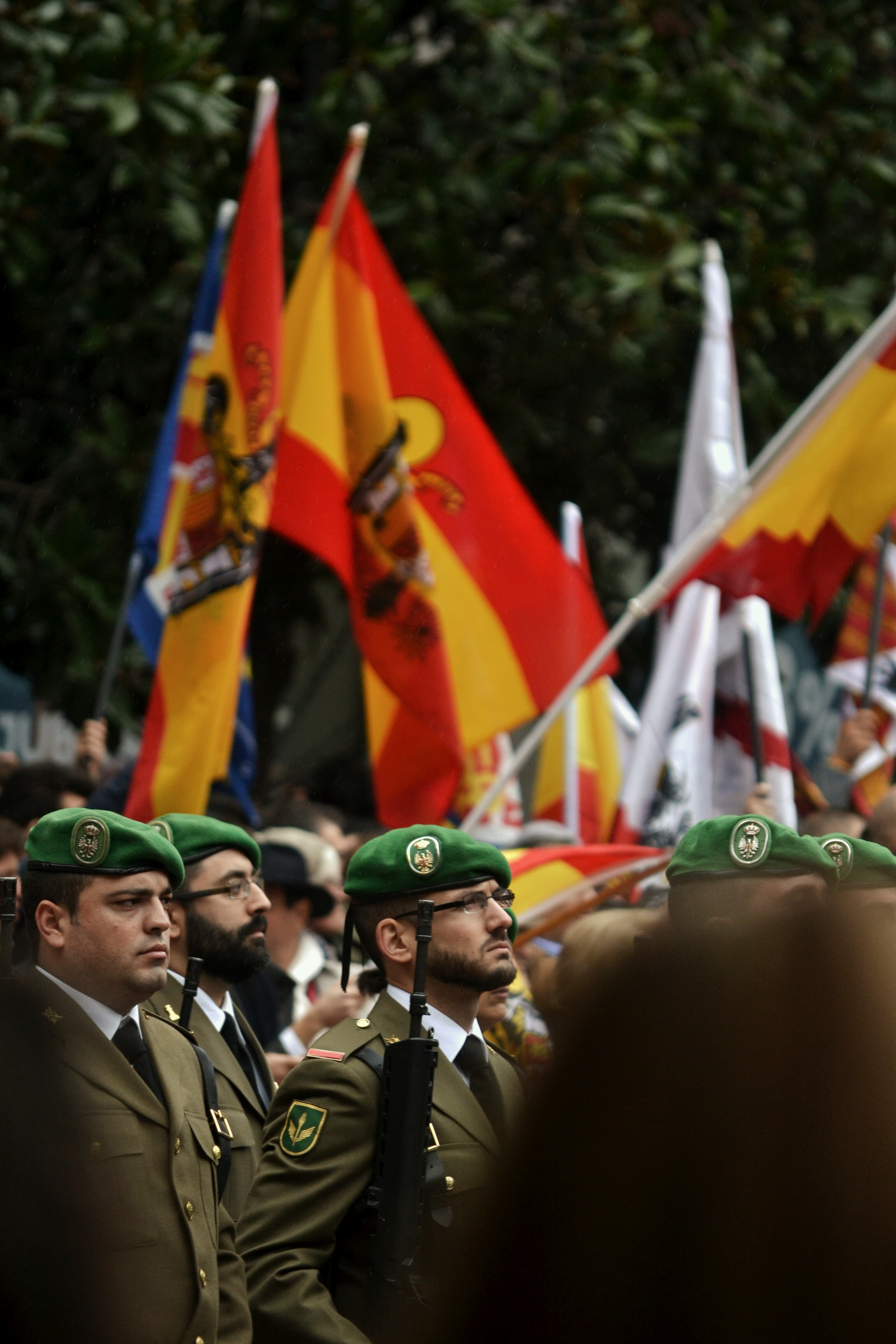
An army parade in Granada attended by far-right sympathizers waving the Francoist flags on the occasion of Día de la Toma de Granada, 2 January 2016

Along with the rhetoric of the crusades, the rhetoric of the 'Reconquista' serves as a rallying point in the political discourse of the contemporary far-right in Spain, Portugal and, more broadly, it also serves as a rallying point in the political discourse of the far-right in Europe. Frequently, references to the Reconquista and the crusades are allegorically played as internet meme by 21st-century online far-right groups which seek to convey anti-Muslim sentiments. The theme has also been used as a major rallying point by identitarian groups in France and Italy.

Día de la Toma de Granada, the annual commemoration of the surrender of Sultan Boabdil in Granada on 2 January acquired a markedly nationalistic undertone during the early years of the Francoist regime and, since the death of the dictator Francisco Franco in 1975, it has served as glue for extreme right groups by facilitating their open-air physical gatherings and providing them with an occasion which they can use to explicitly state their political demands. A Spanish Legion unit usually parades and sings El novio de la muerte ("Boyfriend of death"). The far right has also waged a culture war by claiming dates in the history of the Reconquista, such as the aforementioned 2 January or 2 February, regional festivities for the related autonomous communities (Andalusia and Murcia).

== See also ==
- Convivencia

== Bibliography ==
- Barton, Simon. Beyond the Reconquista: New Directions in the History of Medieval Iberia (711–1085) (2020) online
- Bishko, Charles Julian, 1975. The Spanish and Portuguese Reconquest, 1095–1492 in A History of the Crusades, vol. 3: The Fourteenth and Fifteenth Centuries, edited by Harry W. Hazard, (University of Wisconsin Press) online edition
- Bradbury, Jim (2004). The Routledge Companion to Medieval Warfare. Abingdon: Routledge. pp. 21, 314. ISBN 978-1134598472.
- Brescó, Ignacio, and Floor van Alphen. "Chapter 4 – Reenacting the Reconquista Myth? Some Reflections on Moros y Cristianos Festivals in Spain" in Historical Reenactment (Berghahn, 2022) doi:10.1515/9781800735415-006
- Catlos, Brian A. (2018). Kingdoms of Faith : A New History of Islamic Spain. New York: Basic Books. ISBN 978-0-465-05587-6. OCLC 1003304619.
- Collins, Roger (1989). The Arab Conquest of Spain, 710–797. Oxford: Blackwell Publishing. ISBN 0-631-15923-1.
- David Cuberes; Rafael González-Val (2017). "The Effect of the Spanish Reconquest on Iberian Cities" (PDF). Annals of Regional Science. 58 (3): 375–416. Bibcode:2017ARegS..58..375C. doi:10.1007/s00168-017-0810-0.
- Dedieu, Jean-Pierre (1987) L'Inquisition. Les Editions Fides
- Deyermond, Alan (1985). "The Death and Rebirth of Visigothic Spain in the Estoria de España". Revista Canadiense de Estudios Hispánicos. 9 (3): 345–367.
- Fábregas, Adela, ed. (2021). The Nasrid kingdom of Granada between East and West : (thirteenth to fifteenth centuries). Leiden: Brill. ISBN 978-90-04-44234-4.
- Fletcher, R. A. "Reconquest and Crusade in Spain c. 1050–1150", Transactions of the Royal Historical Society 37, (1987). pp. 252–285. doi:10.2307/3679149
- García Fitz, Francisco, Guerra y relaciones políticas. Castilla-León y los musulmanes, ss. XI–XIII, Universidad de Sevilla, 2002.
- García Fitz, Francisco (2009). "La Reconquista: un estado de la cuestión" (PDF). Clío & Crímen: Revista del Centro de Historia del Crimen de Durango (in Spanish) (6). ISSN 1698-4374. Archived (PDF) from the original on 18 April 2016.
- García Fitz, Francisco & Feliciano Novoa Portela Cruzados en la Reconquista, Madrid, 2014.
- García-Sanjuán, Alejandro. "Rejecting al-Andalus, exalting the Reconquista: historical memory in contemporary Spain." Journal of Medieval Iberian Studies 10.1 (2018): 127–145. online
- Hillgarth, J. N. (2009). The Visigoths in History and Legend. Toronto: Pontifical Institute for Medieval Studies.
- Kamen, Henry (2005). Spain, 1469–1714: a society of conflict (3rd ed.). Harlow (GB) New York: Pearson/Longman. ISBN 978-0-582-78464-2.
- Linehan, Peter. History and the historians of medieval Spain (Oxford UP, 1993) pp. 95–127. online
- Lomax, Derek William: The Reconquest of Spain. Longman, London 1978. ISBN 0-582-50209-8
- Lopez, Cesar, Mario Carretero, and Maria Rodriguez-Moneo. "Conquest or reconquest? Students' conceptions of nation embedded in a historical narrative." Journal of the Learning Sciences 24.2 (2015): 252–285.
- McKitterick, Rosamond, ed. The New Cambridge Medieval History: Volume 2, c. 700–c. 900 (2015)
- Monter, William (1990). Frontiers of Heresy. The Spanish Inquisition from the Basque Land to Sicily. Cambridge University Press
- Nicolle, David and Angus McBride. El Cid and the Reconquista 1050–1492 (Men-At-Arms, No 200) (1988), focus on soldiers
- O'Callaghan, Joseph F.: Reconquest and Crusade in Medieval Spain (University of Pennsylvania Press, 2002), ISBN 0-8122-3696-3
- O'Callaghan, Joseph F. (2014). The Last Crusade in the West : Castile and the Conquest of Granada. Philadelphia: University of Pennsylvania Press. ISBN 978-0-8122-0935-8.
- Payne, Stanley, "The Emergence of Portugal", in A History of Spain and Portugal: Volume One.
- Perez, Joseph (2006) The Spanish Inquisition: A History, Yale University Press. ISBN 0-300-11982-8, ISBN 978-0-300-11982-4
- Queimada e Silva, Tiago . "The Reconquista revisited: mobilising medieval Iberian history in Spain, Portugal and beyond." in The Crusades in the Modern World (2019) pp: 57–74.
- Reilly, Bernard F. (1993). The Medieval Spains. Cambridge Medieval Textbooks. Cambridge, UK: Cambridge University Press. ISBN 0-521-39741-3.
- Riley-Smith, Jonathan, The Atlas of the Crusades. Facts on File, Oxford (1991)
- Roth, Cecil. The Spanish Inquisition. (W. W. Norton & Company, New York, 1964)
- Van Alphen, Floor, and Brady Wagoner. "Reconstructing the 'Reconquista': Students' negotiation of a Spanish master narrative." Memory studies 16.5 (2023): 1156–1172. online
- Villegas-Aristizábal, Lucas, 2013, "Revisiting the Anglo-Norman Crusaders' Failed Attempt to Conquer Lisbon c. 1142", Portuguese Studies 29:1, pp. 7–20. JSTOR 10.5699/portstudies.29.1.0007
- Villegas-Aristizábal, Lucas, 2009, "Anglo-Norman Involvement in the Conquest and Settlement of Tortosa, 1148–1180", Crusades 8, pp. 63–129.
- Villegas-Aristizábal, Lucas, 2018, "Was the Portuguese Led Military Campaign against Alcácer do Sal in the Autumn of 1217 Part of the Fifth Crusade?" Al-Masāq 30:1 doi:10.1080/09503110.2018.1542573
- Watt, W. Montgomery: A History of Islamic Spain. Edinburgh University Press (1992).
- Watt, W. Montgomery: The Influence of Islam on Medieval Europe. (Edinburgh 1972).
