= Munuza =

Umayyad governor

Uthman ibn Naissa (Arabic: عثمان بن نيساء), better known as Munuza, was a Berber governor (wali) who established an independent power base in Cerdanya on the eastern Pyrenees (in modern-day southern France) around 731 AD, breaking away from the Umayyad Caliphate. He was the wali of Narbonne and Cerdagne, in addition to the Spanish territory of Catalonia. To solidify his position, he formed an alliance with the Duke of Aquitaine, Odo the Great, and married his daughter Lampegia. He was eventually defeated by the Umayyad forces of Abd al-Rahman ibn Abd Allah al-Ghafiqi. Munuza's defeat was followed by Umayyad forces turning their attention to Odo, which led to the Umayyad victory at the Battle of the River Garonne.

Munuza is depicted in different contradictory chronicles during the Muslim conquest of the Iberian Peninsula. He is also possibly the same man as the governor of León and/or Gijón defeated by Pelagius in the late 710s/early 720s. Munuza is also believed to have been a companion of the Berber leader Tariq ibn Ziyad.

== Munuza in Asturias ==
One account says that he was the governor of Gijón (or possibly León) after Musa ibn Nusayr raided northwestern Iberia (including the region of Asturias but not Cantabria in modern Spain) during the first decade of the Umayyad conquest of Hispania in the early 8th century. He was subject to the Wāli of Al-Andalus, Anbasa ibn Suhaym Al-Kalbi. According to late 9th century Asturian chronicles, he was defeated after the Battle of Covadonga and killed by Pelayo of Asturias at the beginning of the Reconquista.

Tradition (late Asturian chronicles) has it that he fell in love with Pelayo's sister, Ormesinda, and that, together with Kazim, kidnapped and married her. The chronicle of Alfonso III speaks of a "compulsory marriage", the failure of which compelled Pelayo into rebellion. The historical context can only be speculated, but Pelayo may have tried to secure alliances and a preferential status among the local nobles through the marriage of his sister to the new power in the area, as the Asturian kings would later do with Basques in Pamplona and all of the Christian families did with the Caliphate in Córdoba. It may also have served as a counterweight to Peter of Cantabria and represented nominal submission.

After the loss of a Muslim garrison out on a punitive expedition, Munuza may have taken undisputed control of the Asturian coastal region, but kept court in the western districts closer to dominated and occupied Galicia. Having been defeated in his bid to secure the region of León, he may have fled from Gijón, but Christian chronicles reported he was killed with all his soldiers in Trubia or La Felguera.

== Munuza in Cerdanya ==
Other contemporary chronicles speak of "Munuza", a distorted name standing for Uthman ibn Naissa, a Berber commander in charge of operations in the Umayyad-occupied eastern Pyrenees, Cerdanya, a decade later. He may not have died in Asturias, and may have been assigned to the new location by the Umayyad commanders.

Odo the Great had a rival in Charles Martel of the Franks, who, for whatever reason, had not come to his assistance at the Battle of Toulouse in 721. Charles wanted Aquitaine, and Odo, as master of Aquitaine and hero of Toulouse, was a possible rallying point for anyone opposing the Austrasian usurper mayors among the Franks.

In 730, Munuza, the Berber deputy governor of Catalunya, hearing of the oppression of Berbers in North Africa, negotiated a peace treaty with Odo, sealed by the marriage of Odo's daughter, Lampegia, to Munuza. Arab raids on Aquitanian possessions immediately ceased and peace was temporarily restored.

In 731, Charles Martel, after defeating the Saxons, turned his attention to the rival southern realm of Aquitaine, denounced Odo's alliance with Uthman ibn Naissa, and crossed the Loire, thus breaking his peace treaty with Odo. The Frankish leader ransacked Aquitaine twice, seizing Bourges too, and Odo engaged the Frankish troops but was defeated. Charles went back to Francia.

Meanwhile, Munuza had revolted against the Arab governor-general of al-Andalus, with the aim of setting up an independent Catalunya for himself. Munuza went on to kill Nambaudus, the bishop of Urgell, an official of the Hispanic Church based in Toledo. Munuza was declared a traitor and attacked. Odo was dealing with Martel and unable to come to his aid. Munuza was defeated in a brief battle and executed by the Cordovan Wali Abd al-Rahman al-Ghafiqi.

Odo was accused by the governor-general of abetting the traitor. Odo was attacked by an Arab army and beaten at Bordeaux, the city the Arabs called al-Burdil.

== See also ==
- Al-Andalus
- Early Muslim conquests
- Timeline of the Muslim presence in the Iberian Peninsula
