= Lampegia =

Daughter of Odo the Great

Lampegia (d. after 730) was a medieval Aquitanian noblewoman.

She was the daughter of Odo the Great. Her father arranged for her to marry Munuza, Governor of Catalonia, in an alliance toward the Franks.

Her spouse rebelled against Abd al-Rahman ibn Abd Allah al-Ghafiqi, who in 730 took the Llivia Fortress, executed Munuza and sent Lampegia as a slave concubine to the Umayyad harem of Hisham ibn Abd al-Malik in Damascus.
