= Odo the Great =

8th-century Duke of Aquitaine

Duke of Aquitaine and Gascony
- Reign: c. 700–735
- Predecessor: Lupus I of Aquitaine
- Successor: Hunald I
- Died: 735 to 740
- Issue: Lampegia

Odo the Great (also called Eudes or Eudo) (died 735–740), was the Duke of Aquitaine by 700. His territory included Vasconia in the south-west of Gaul and the Duchy of Aquitaine (at that point located north-east of the river Garonne), a realm extending from the Loire to the Pyrenees, with the capital in Toulouse. He fought the Carolingian Franks and made alliances with the Moors to combat them. He retained this domain until 735. He is remembered for defeating the Umayyads in 721 in the Battle of Toulouse. He was the first to defeat them decisively in Western Europe. The feat earned him the epithet "the Great". He also played a crucial role in the Battle of Tours, working closely with Charles Martel, whose alliance he sought after the Umayyad invasion of what is now southern France in 732.

== Early life ==
His earlier life is obscure, as are his ancestry and ethnicity. One theory suggests that he was of Roman origin as contemporary Frankish chroniclers refer to his father as an enemy Roman. Several Dukes of Aquitaine have been suggested as Odo's father: Boggis or Bertrand, or Duke Lupus I. According to the spurious Charte d'Alaon, Hubertus was one of Odo's brothers.

Odo succeeded to the ducal throne maybe as early as 679 (probable date of the death of Lupus) or 688. Other dates are possible, including 692, but he was certainly in power by 700.

== Early leadership ==
The historian Jean de Jaurgain cites him as fighting in 711 against the Visigoth Roderic in Pamplona. In 715 he declared himself independent during the civil war raging in Gaul. It is not likely that he ever took the title of king.

In 718, he appears raising an army of Basques ("hoste Vasconum commota") as an ally of Chilperic II of Neustria and the Mayor of the Palace Ragenfrid, who may have offered recognition of his kingship over Aquitaine. They were fighting against the Austrasian mayor of the palace, Charles Martel, but after the defeat of Chilperic at Soissons that year, he made peace with Charles by surrendering to him the Neustrian king and his treasures.

== Between Umayyads and Franks ==
Odo was also obliged to fight both the Umayyads and the Franks who invaded his kingdom. On 9 June 721 he inflicted a major defeat upon Al-Samh ibn Malik al-Khawlani at the Battle of Toulouse, the first major battle lost by the Muslim Umayyad forces in their military campaign northwards, claiming the lives of thousands of Umayyad soldiers. The victory was celebrated with gifts from Pope Gregory II, who declared the Aquitanian duke a champion of Roman Christianity and solidified his independence.

In order to help secure his borders against the Umayyads, he married his daughter Lampegia to the Muslim Berber rebel lord Uthman ibn Naissa, called "Munuza" by the Franks, the deputy governor of what would later become Catalonia. (Note: Isidore Pacensis, no. 25, cols. 1245.ff., 'Et quia filiam suam dux Francorum nomine Eudo causa foederis ei in coniugio copulandam ob persecutionem Arabum differendam iam olim tradiderat ad suos libitus inclinandam, dum eam tardidat de manu persequentium liberandam, suam morti debitam praeparat animam.')

== Battles of Garonne, Tours and death ==
In 731, the Frankish leader Charles Martel, after defeating the Saxons, turned his attention to the rival southern realm of Aquitaine, denounced Odo's alliance with Uthman ibn Naissa, and crossed the Loire, so breaking the peace treaty held with Odo. Charles Martel ransacked Aquitaine twice, seizing Bourges, too, and Odo engaged the Frankish troops but was defeated. Charles went back to Francia.

Meanwhile, the Umayyads were gathering forces to attack Odo's ally in the Pyrenean region of Cerdanya (maybe Catalonia) Uthman ibn Naissa. In 731, the Berber lord was subject to the attack of an expedition led by Abdul Rahman Al Ghafiqi, overcoming and killing the rebel leader, and capturing Odo's daughter, who was sent as prisoner to a harem in Damascus. Busy as Odo was trying to fend off Charles's thrust, he didn't make it to help his ally.

In 732, Abdul Rahman Al Ghafiqi's troops raided Vasconia, advanced towards Bordeaux and ransacked the city. Odo engaged them but was defeated by the Umayyads near Bordeaux. Following the defeat, Odo re-organised his scattered forces, and ran north to warn Charles Martel, Mayor of the palaces of Neustria and Austrasia, of the impending threat and to appeal for assistance in fighting the Arab–Berber advance, which he received in exchange for accepting formal Frankish overlordship. The duke, aged almost 80, joined Charles Martel's troops and was to form the Frankish army's left flank, while the Umayyads and the multinational army commanded by Charles built up their forces somewhere between Vienne and the river Clain to the north of Poitiers in preparation for the Battle of Tours (732, or possibly 733).

Odo led his forces to play a major role in defeating the Umayyad army when they broke into the main Cordovan camp and set fire to it, sparking confusion and wreaking havoc with the enemy's rearguard. The alliance defeated the Umayyads at the Battle of Tours in 732, and expelled them from Aquitaine.

After the battle, Charles headed back north to his domains in Francia—Neustria and Austrasia—and duke Odo was left as ruler in Aquitaine and Vasconia. Duke Odo abdicated or died in 735 and was succeeded by his son Hunald. However, he may have died in a monastery where he retreated, perhaps as late as 740. Odo the Great's popularity in Aquitaine is attested by the Vita Pardulfi.

The name of the character of king Yon de Gascogne in the 12th-century tale The Four Sons of Aymon is probably a corruption of Odo.

== Sources ==
- Oman, Charles. The Dark Ages, 476–918. London: Rivingtons, 1914.

Preceded by Lupus	Duke of Aquitaine; 700–735	Succeeded by Hunald I
Preceded by Lupus	Duke of Vasconia; 700–735	Succeeded by
