= Bodegisel =

Bodegisel (also spelled Bodygisil, died 585 or 588) was a Frankish duke (dux). He was the son of Mummolin, duke of Soissons, and served the kings Chilperic I and Childebert II.

Bodegisel was dux of Provence. He was celebrated in song by the contemporary poet Venantius Fortunatus, who praised the education and eloquence he displayed as rector of Marseilles under Sigebert I, a position Bodegisel held until about 565.

In 584, Bodegisel accompanied Rigunth, the daughter of Chilperic I, to Spain for her marriage to Reccared, the son of the Visigothic king Liuvigild, although the marriage never took place. After his return, he was sent on an embassy to Constantinople (capital of the Byzantine Empire) on behalf of Childebert II. Bodegisel stopped at Carthage on the return trip, and he was murdered there, being torn to pieces by a mob. A. C. Murray, paraphrasing Gregory of Tours, says he was struck with a sword as he stepped outside their lodging when a crowd gathered in response to the murder of a merchant committed by one of their retainers.

The bishop and contemporary historian Gregory of Tours records that Bodegisel was able to accomplish the unusual feat of passing on his estate to his heirs undiminished. However, this history does not explicitly identify Bodegisel's heirs—notably, it does not prove that he was the father of Arnulf of Metz.

According to Hans-Walter Herrmann and Ulrich Nonn, confusion between Bodegisel and a later duke named Bobo is responsible for the semi-legendary (and conflated) duke Boggis who appears in sources from the ninth century on. Bobo was a member of an illustrious Austrasian family and a nephew of the deacon Adalgisel Grimo (died 634), but where his dukedom was located is unknown.

According to the thirteenth-century Vita sanctae Odae viduae, Saint Chrodoara was married to a certain duke Boggis and became a nun after his death. According to Herrmann and Nonn, Chrodoara may have been the wife of Bodegisel. Writing in the eleventh century, Sigebert of Gembloux named Boggis a duke of Aquitaine and misplaces his life towards 711. The Vita Landberti episcopi Traiectensis, a life of Bishop Lambert of Maastricht, refers to "Chrodoara ... widow of the recently deceased Boggis, duke of Aquitaine" as a "paternal aunt" of Lambert's. A spurious charter of king Charles the Bald dated 30 January 845 and the Charte d'Alaon, a modern fabrication, give Bodegisel/Boggis an erroneous genealogy that claims he was a son of king Charibert II and gives him a brother named Bertrand who succeeded him.
