= Charte d'Alaon =

Spurious genealogy

The Charte d'Alaon is a spurious and fraudulent charter purporting to provide a genealogy of the house of Odo the Great, Duke of Aquitaine (715 – 735). The 19th-century French historian Joseph-François Rabanis proved it to be a hoax fabricated in the 17th century. His research thus rendered a good deal of "known" Gascon and Navarrese genealogy meaningless.

Among the many otherwise unattested claims of the Charte are the descent of the dukes of Aquitaine and Gascony from the Merovingian king Charibert II. The younger sons, if there were younger sons, of Charibert are in fact unknown; as is the parentage of Odo the Great. Likewise, the parentage of Lupus II of Gascony is unknown and no relationship between him and the house of Odo or the Merovingians can be proven.

The Jiménez dynasty that ruled Navarre from the 10th through 13th centuries was also purported to descend from one of the sons of Lupus. Though a relation between Lupus and Seguin I can be posited reasonably, no relationship between either and the Basques of Spain can be shown. In fact, the Basque ethnicity of neither the Aquitainian or Gascon dukes can be demonstrated conclusively. In response to such Spanish genealogies, Higounet attacked them as "phantasmagorical." Historian Jules Villain even proposed a connection between the comital dynasties of Comminges and Foix and Lupus II. His whole thesis, however, is incoherent. In the end analysis, neither the parents, wives, nor children of Lupus II are known. Though a few reasonable surmises can be made.

== Sources ==
- Charte d'Alaon at Foixstory.
- Higounet, Charles. Bordeaux pendant le haut moyen age. Bordeaux, 1963.
- Collins, Roger. The Basques. Blackwell Publishing: London, 1990.
- Rabanis, Joseph-François. Les Merovingiens de Aquitanie, essay historique et critique de la Charte D'Alaon. Paris, 1856.
- Monlezun, Jean Justin. Histoire de la Gascogne. 1864. Relies on Charte.
- Villain, Jean. La France Moderne, dictionnaire généalogique, historique et biographique. 1908. Relies on Charte.
