= Battle of the River Garonne =

732 Umayyad victory in France

Battle of Bordeaux
- Odo leaving Bordeaux after the battle.
Date	732
Location	Bordeaux, France 45°2′29″N 0°36′24″W
Result	Umayyad victory: Umayyads capture Bordeaux

Belligerents
Umayyad Caliphate	Duchy of Aquitaine

Commanders and leaders
Abd al-Rahman al-Ghafiqi	Odo the Great

Strength
Unknown; described as a large army	Unknown

Casualties and losses
Unknown	Unknown; contemporary source states that only God knew the number of dead
- Location within France

The Battle of the River Garonne, also known as the Battle of Bordeaux, was fought in 732 between an Umayyad army led by Abdul Rahman Al-Ghafiqi, governor of Al-Andalus, and Aquitanian forces led by Duke Odo of Aquitaine.

== Background ==
At the beginning of his governorship of Al-Andalus in 730 Abdul Rahman was opposed by a local Berber commander called Uthman ibn Naissa (Othman Ibn Abi Nes'ah Manuza; Othman-ben-Abou-Nessa; a.k.a. Munuza) whose stronghold was the town of Cerritania (Cerdanya, possibly the fortress of Llívia) in the Pyrenees. Munuza, hearing of the oppression of Berbers in North Africa, had made a truce with Odo, and detach from Cordovan central rule. Some accounts claim that Odo promised his daughter Lampade to Munuza in a marriage alliance.

Odo was busy trying to fend off Charles Martel's thrust on the northern fringes of Aquitaine, so preventing the duke from assisting his southern ally. Munuza's death immediately preceded Abdul Rahman's expedition, which crossed the Pyrenees at their west end, through Navarre and rampaged its way through Gascony with great speed, first ravaging Auch, and moving on all the way to Bordeaux. The city was captured by storm, the commander of the garrison being killed in the battle.

== Battle ==
Following the victory at Bordeaux, Abdul Rahman engaged Odo's forces on the Garonne, or possibly at the Dordogne, in his march northward. Abdul Rahman's army numbered 70,000 to 80,000 men who defeated Odo, according to Benett. However, such huge figures on the tradition of medieval chronicles have been questioned, since the expedition was an unusually large raid against the Aquitanian duke Odo (Lewis, A.R.; Collins, R.). The defeat was comprehensive and most of Odo's forces were wiped out or ran in disarray, after which the Umayyads looted the rich monasteries of northern Aquitaine before resuming their march towards Tours, a town said to be holding abundant wealth and treasures.

== Aftermath ==
This plundering gave Odo enough time to re-organise his Aquitanian troops and according to chronicles notified Charles of the impending danger to the Frankish kingdom. The Frankish leader took notice, accepted Odo's formal submission and Odo joined Charles's army to form its left wing. The Umayyad armies were finally defeated by forces (size of the two armies is debated by modern historians) led by Charles Martel at the Battle of Tours that took place somewhere between Poitiers and Tours on 10 October, 732 (or 733 according to latest research).

The far reaching political consequences of this defeat were Charles Martel's intervention in Aquitaine, the temporary end of Basque-Aquitanian sovereignty and Odo's formal submission to Charles, confirmed after the Battle of Tours-Poitiers.
