= Battle of Toulouse (721) =

Aquitanian–Umayyad battle in medieval France

Coordinates: 43.6000°N 1.4500°E

- Part of the Umayyad invasion of Gaul
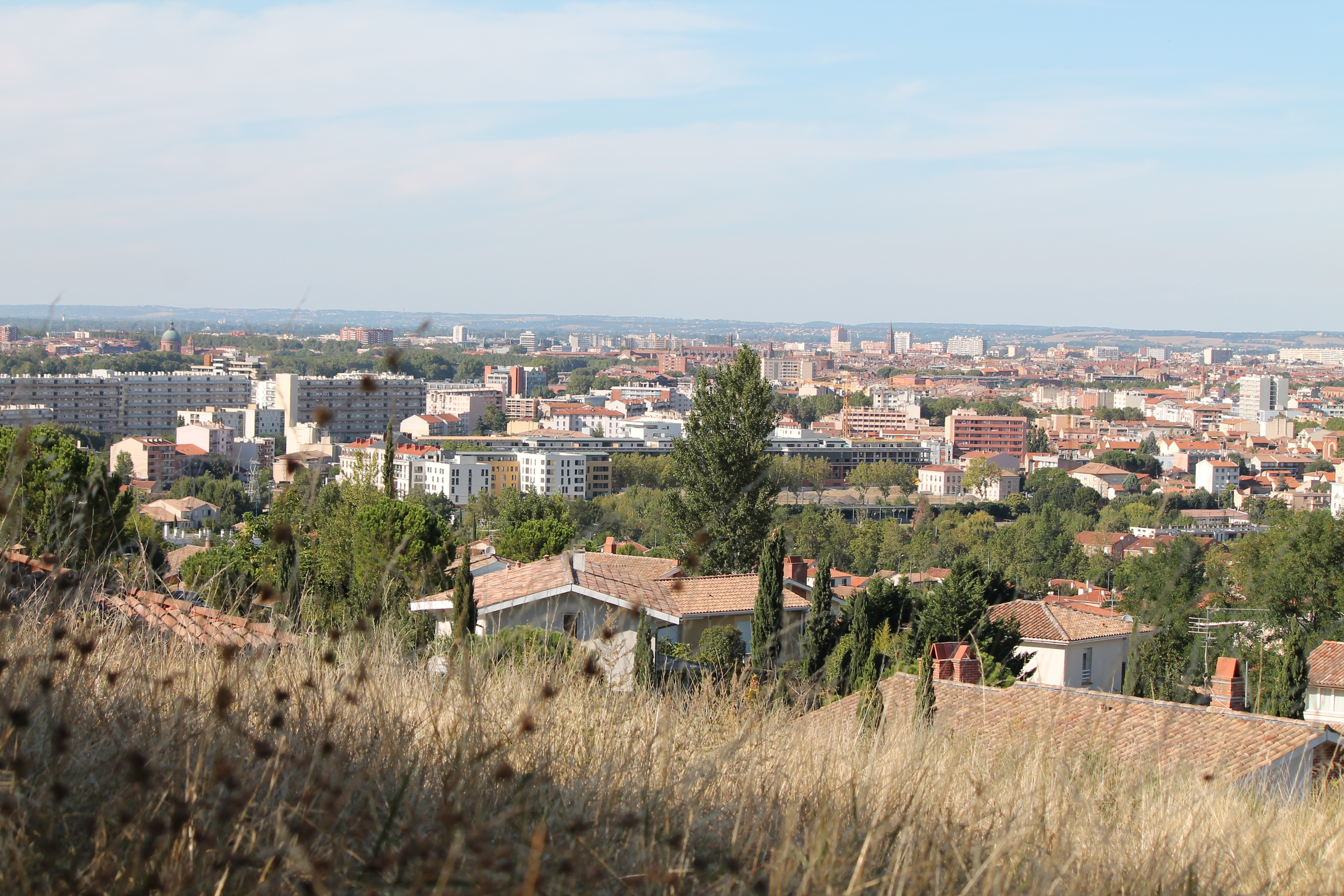
- Toulouse seen from the hills of Pech-David
Date	9 June 721
Location	Toulouse, Duchy of Aquitaine, Francia
Result	Aquitanian victory

Belligerents
Duchy of Aquitaine	Umayyad Caliphate

Commanders and leaders
Odo the Great	Khawlani †

The Battle of Toulouse (721) was a victory of an Aquitanian Christian army led by Odo the Great, Duke of Aquitaine over an Umayyad Muslim army besieging the city of Toulouse, led by al-Samh ibn Malik al-Khawlani, the Umayyad wāli (governor-general) of al-Andalus. The decisive Aquitanian victory checked the spread of Umayyad control westward from Narbonne into Aquitaine.

== Battle ==
After conquering the Visigothic kingdom, the Umayyads, led by the governor of Al-Andalus Al-Samh ibn Malik al-Khawlani, assembled an army to cross the Pyrenees and conquer Septimania and Aquitaine. Begun in 719, the campaign was initially successful with the capture of Narbonne.

Al-Samh ibn Malik al-Khawlani, the Umayyad wāli (governor-general) of al-Andalus, built up an army of Arabs and Berbers from Umayyad territories to conquer Aquitaine, a large duchy in the southwest of modern-day France, formally under Frankish sovereignty, but in practice almost independent in the hands of the Duke of Aquitaine. British archaeologist Ian Meadows states that al-Samh's aim was to take the Garonne River valley, capture the city of Toulouse, and open up a vast territory stretching all the way to the Atlantic Sea and back south through Muslim-ruled Iberia to the Mediterranean Sea and North Africa.

Al-Samh's army included siege engines, infantry, a few horsemen and some mercenaries, as well as Basque slingers. He besieged the city of Toulouse, then Aquitaine's most important city. Duke Odo the Great, otherwise known as Eudes, was not in the city when it was besieged, having left to find help. He asked assistance from the Merovingian Maire du Palais Charles Martel, but the Austrasians were engaged in a war against the Saxons, and remained deaf to his appeals, who in turn preferred to wait and see rather than help his southern rival.

Odo returned three months later with Aquitanian, Gascon, and Frankish troops, and just as the city was about to surrender, he attacked the Umayyad invasion force on June 9. The exact origin of the Frankish troops is not certain, but they may have hailed from southern Aquitanian areas, e.g., in the Lower Rhone, where naturalized Franks had settled down decades or centuries before. After Odo originally fled, the Umayyads became overconfident, and instead of maintaining strong outer defenses around their siege camp and continuously scouting, they did neither. Thus, when Odo returned, he was able to launch an assault on the siege force, both from behind and from forces within the walls. The surprised Umayyads scattered with the first attack. Odo's forces cut down those who were resting or fled without weapons or armour.

Al-Samh ibn Malik al-Khawlani managed to get away with a fraction of his forces but died shortly thereafter, leaving Anbasa ibn Suhaym Al-Kalbi (721–725) as governor. The number of soldiers who engaged in the battle has been grossly inflated to about 300,000 on Odo's side (Al-Maqqari), and a death toll of 375,000 on the assaulting Umayyad troops. The figures give a rough idea of the scale of the confrontation. In a letter to Pope Gregory II, Odo said he had killed 375,000 Saracens in one day and lost 1,500 of his men.

A miracle is associated with the battle according to the Liber Pontificalis: Pope Gregory II had sent Odo "three blessed sponges/baskets of bread" in 720, which the Duke kept until just before the engagement. He distributed small portions of these to be eaten by his troops at Toulouse, and after the battle, it was reported that no one who had eaten the bread had been killed or wounded.

== Aftermath ==
After the defeat, some Umayyad officials and soldiers managed to escape, among them Abdul Rahman Al Ghafiqi. The clash indefinitely halted the Umayyad expansion northwards. Al-Andalus was at the time reorganising into a new post-Gothic order. The Umayyads kept the military initiative raiding several times the south of Gaul, and avoided new serious campaigns into the north-west.

Odo was hailed as champion of Christianity by the Pope in Rome and was presented with gifts. Charles steered clear of the political and military developments in the south of Gaul until 732.

Some authors have called the fateful engagement the Balat Al Shuhada of Toulouse; others attach that name exclusively to the Battle of Poitiers (Tours). According to Meadows, it would still be remembered in memorials by Al-Andalus Muslims for the following 450 years, as opposed to the Battle of Poitiers, held as a battle smaller in scale.

== Bibliography ==
- Nelson, Janet L. (2019). King and Emperor: A New Life of Charlemagne. Oakland, California: University of California Press. ISBN 978-0520314207.
