= Abd al-Rahman ibn Abd Allah al-Ghafiqi =

Muslim general of the 8th century

Mujahideen Abd al-Rahman al-Ghafiqi
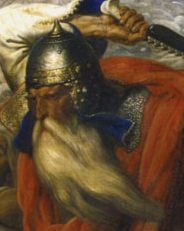
- Abd-al-Rahman al-Ghafiqi as depicted in Charles de Steuben's Bataille de Poitiers en Octobre 732.
- Born: Abd al-Rahman ibn Abd Allah Al-Ghafiqi; Tihamah, Arabia, Umayyad Caliphate
- Died: 10 October 732; Vouneuil-sur-Vienne, Poitiers, Francia
- Military career
- Allegiance: Umayyad Caliphate
- Service years: 721–732
- Conflicts: Battle of Toulouse (721); Battle of the River Garonne; Battle of Tours †

'Abd al-Rahman ibn Abd Allah Al-Ghafiqi (Arabic: عبد الرحمن بن عبد اللّه الغافقي, romanized: ʿAbd al-Raḥmān ibn ʿAbd Allāh al-Ghāfiqī; died 732), was an Arab Umayyad commander and governor who led Andalusian Muslim forces against the Franks. His invasion failed, and he was killed in action against the forces of Charles Martel in the Battle of Tours on October 10, 732 AD.

== Early years ==
From the Arab Tihamite tribe of Ghafiq, he relocated to Ifriqiya (now Tunisia), then to the stretch of the Maghreb that is now Algeria, Morocco, Tunisia and Mauritania, where he became acquainted with Musa ibn Nusayr and his son Abd al-Aziz, the governors of al-Andalus.

== Campaigns ==
=== Battle of Toulouse ===
Abd Al-Rahman took part in the Battle of Toulouse, where Al Samh ibn Malik was killed in 721 (102 AH) by the forces of Duke Odo of Aquitaine. After the severe defeat, he fled south along with other commanders and troops, and took over the command of Eastern Andalus. He was briefly relieved of his command, when Anbasa ibn Suhaym al-Kalbi was appointed in 721. After Anbasa died in 726 in southern Gaul, several successive commanders were put in place, none of whom lasted very long.

=== Rebellion in Cerdanya ===
In 730, the Caliph Hisham ibn Abd al-Malik appointed Abd Al-Rahman as wali (governor) of al-Andalus. David Levering Lewis describes him as "intelligent, eloquent, and an accomplished administrator". On hearing that Uthman ibn Naissa, the Berber deputy governor of Catalunya, had concluded an alliance with duke Odo of Aquitaine, in order to set up an independent Catalunya for himself, the governor hurried to quell the rebellion. He engaged the Berber lord's forces and killed him in 731. By some accounts, Uthman ibn Naissa killed himself.

=== Battle of the River Garonne ===
The wali assembled troops in Pamplona, called for recruits from Yemen and the Levant, and prepared to cross the Pyrenees into Gaul. Many arrived, and he crossed the Pyrenees range with an army composed primarily of Arabs. Emir Abd Al-Rahman made his way through Gascony and Aquitaine, according to one unidentified Arab, "That army went through all places like a desolating storm," sacking and capturing the city of Bordeaux, after defeating Duke Odo of Aquitaine in battle outside the city, and then again defeating a second army of Duke Odo at the Battle of the River Garonne —where the western chroniclers state, "God alone knows the number of the slain." Unlike Toulouse, where Odo had won by achieving complete surprise over the Umayyad forces when he relieved the city in 721, this time his forces were forced to face the Umayyad cavalry in open battle and were utterly destroyed. Also, the Umayyad forces he had faced at the Battle of Toulouse were primarily light infantry and, while good fighters, were not remotely close to the caliber of the Arab cavalry brought by the Emir in this invasion.

=== Battle of Tours and death ===
Odo, with his remaining nobility, fled to Charles Martel, seeking help. Charles was campaigning on the Danube when news reached him. Martel had a seasoned professional infantry which had campaigned with him for many years and force-marched his army towards Acquitaine. In addition to the levies of militia the Franks normally called up to buttress their forces, he formed an army of Gauls and Germans approximately 30,000 strong. The invading forces, having no reason to believe the Franks were anything more than one of the various barbarian tribes that had ravaged Europe after Rome's fall, failed to scout their strength in advance. They also misjudged Charles Martel, who was determined to prevent the expansion of the Caliphate over the Pyrenees into the heart of Christian Europe. This was a disastrous mistake which led to the defeat of Abd Al-Rahman in 732 near Poitiers, south of the river Loire.

The Frankish leader chose the battlefield. Moving his army over the mountains and avoiding the open roads, he escaped detection until positioning his men on a high, wooded plain. Martel had carefully chosen the battlefield, in large part knowing the hills and trees surrounding his position would greatly hinder the Umayyad cavalry. For seven days, the two armies skirmished and maneuvered, with the Islamic forces recalling all their raiding parties, so that on the seventh day, their army was at full strength. Martel also received some reinforcements, though most historians agree he was badly outnumbered during the battle. Martel trained his men to fight in a large square, similar to the ancient Greek phalanx formation, to withstand the Umayyad heavy cavalry. The Franks held their defensive formation all day, and repulsed repeated charges by the Umayyad heavy cavalry.

According to Lewis, the Umayyad soldiers were accompanied by their families. Wives and concubines were among the casualties. Realizing their camp was being plundered, a large contingent of Abd Al-Rahman's forces broke off battle and returned to rescue their booty. Abd Al-Rahman was thus left exposed before the Frankish infantry and was killed in battle while attempting to rally his men. One reason for the defeat of the Umayyad army was their preoccupation with war booty; another was the squabbles between various ethnic and tribal factions, which led to the surviving generals being unable to agree on a single commander to take Abd Al-Rahman's place. Political factions, racial and ethnic rivalries, and personality clashes arose following his death. The varied nationalities and ethnicities present in an army drawn from all over the Caliphate, and the surviving generals, bickered among themselves, unable to agree on a commander to lead them the following day. The inability to select anyone to lead certainly contributed to the wholesale retreat of an army that was still dangerous.

== See also ==
- Battle of Tours
- Al-Andalus

== Notes ==
Preceded by Al-Samh ibn Malik al-Khawlani	Governor of Al-Andalus; 721–722	Succeeded by Anbasa ibn Suhaym Al-Kalbi
Preceded by Muhammad ibn Abd Allah al-Ashja'i	Governor of Al-Andalus; 730–732	Succeeded by Abd al-Malik ibn Katan al-Fihri
