= Timeline of Septimania =

Septimania was the western region of the Roman province of Gallia Narbonensis that passed under the control of the Visigoths in 462. It passed briefly to the Emirate of Córdoba in the eighth century before its reconquest by the Franks, who by the end of the ninth century termed it Gothia. This article presents a timeline of its history.

== Visigoths and Franks ==
- 507: The Frankish king Clovis defeated the Visigoths in the Battle of Vouillé. Afterwards, the child-king Amalaric was carried for safety into the Iberian Peninsula. Aquitania passed into the hands of the Franks, and Septimania, with other Visigothic territories in Gaul, was ruled by Amalaric's maternal grandfather, Theodoric the Great.
- 509: Theodoric the Great created the first kingdom of Septimania, retaining its traditional capital at Narbonne. He appointed as his regent an Ostrogothic nobleman named Theudis.
- 522: The young Amalaric was proclaimed king.
- 526: Theodoric died. Amalaric assumed full royal power in the Iberian Peninsula and Septimania, relinquishing Provence to his cousin Athalaric. He married Clotilda, daughter of Clovis, but found, as other royal husbands of Merovingian princesses found, that the entanglement brought on him the penalty of a Frankish invasion.
- 531: Amalaric lost his life in the Frankish invasion, and Arian Visigothic Septimania was the last part of Gaul to remain in Visigothic hands.
- 534 Prince Theudebert son of Theuderic of Austrasia (Merovingian Frankish not Gothic) invaded Septimania in concert with Prince Gunthar son of King Chlothar. Gunthar stopped at Rodez and did not invade Septimania. Theudebert took and held the country as far as Béziers and Carbiriers from which he took the woman Deuteria as a wife. Theudebert and his half brother Childebert invaded Spain as far as Saragossa 534–538. At some point soon after this, the Visigoths regained the territory they had lost in Theudebert's invasion.
- 586 Merovingian King of Burgundy Guntram raised a force to invade Septimania as a prelude to conquest of Spain. His forces plundered from Nîmes to Carcassonne (where the Frankish Count Terentiolus of Limoges was killed) but were unable to take the walled cities. Visigothic Prince Recared came in response from Spain to Narbonne and as far as Nîmes and invaded nearby Frankish territories as far as Tolosa for plunder and to punish the Franks for the invasion (Gregory of Tours Book VIII 30-31 and 38). Frankish rebel Dukes Desiderius and Austrovald at that time in control of Tolosa raised an army and attacked Carcassonne. Desiderius was defeated and killed and Austrovald retreated with his for Tolosa (Gregory of Tours Book VIII 44).
- 587 Septimania came under Catholic Rule in 587 with the conversion of Reccared I, who had become the King of the Visigoths in 586 with his father, Leovigild's death. At that time Arian Bishop Athaloc and Counts Granista and Wildigern revolted against Recared in Septimania but were defeated (Gregory of Tours Book IX 15 and John of Biclar) Most of the Christian population of the province were already Catholic and Arian Christians largely converted with the death of Athaloc soon after Recared's conversion.
- 589 Merovingian King of Burgundy Guntram again tried to invade Septimania sending Austrovald to Carcassonne and Boso and Antestius to other cities. King Recared sent General Claudius who defeated the Franks and preserved the territory of Septimania under Visigothic Rule.
- 713: The Visigoths of Septimania elected Ardo as king. He ruled from Narbonne.

== Moorish rule ==
The Moors, under Al-Samh ibn Malik the governor-general of al-Andalus swept up the Iberian peninsula.

- 717: Umayyads under al-Hurr ibn Abd al-Rahman al-Thaqafi crossed the Pyrenees for the first time on a reconnaissance mission.
- 719: The next Umayyad governor, al-Samh, crossed the Pyrenees in 719 and conquered Narbonne (Arbuna to the Arabs) in that year or the following (720).
- 720: Al-Samh set up his capital at Narbonne, which the Moors called Arbūna. He offered the still largely Arian inhabitants generous terms.
- Al-Samh quickly pacified the other cities. With Narbonne secure, and most important, its port, for the Arab mariners were masters now of the Western Mediterranean, he swiftly subdued the largely unresisting cities, still controlled by their Visigoth counts: taking Alet and Béziers, Agde, Lodève, Maguelonne and Nîmes.
- 721: By now Al-Samh was reinforced and ready to lay siege to Toulouse, a possession that would open up Aquitaine to him on the same terms as Septimania. But his plans were overthrown in the disastrous Battle of Toulouse (721), with immense losses, in which al-Samh was so seriously wounded that he soon died at Narbonne.
- 720's: Arab forces soundly based in Narbonne and easily resupplied by sea, struck eastwards.
- 731: The Berber wali of Narbonne and the region of Cerdanya, Uthman ibn Naissa, called "Munuza" by the Franks, who was recently linked by marriage to duke Eudes of Aquitaine, revolted against Córdoba, and was defeated and killed.
- 732 October: An Islamic invasion force made up primarily of Berber and Arab cavalry under Abdul Rahman Al Ghafiqi encountered Charles Martel and his veteran Frankish army between Tours and Poitiers and was defeated, and Abd er-Rahman was killed, at what the majority of historians consider the macrohistorical "Battle of Tours" that stopped the Moorish advance.

== Frankish reconquest ==
- 732: The Franks took the territory round Toulouse. Charles Martel directed his attention to Narbonne.
- 737: Charles Martel destroyed Arles, Avignon, and Nîmes, but unsuccessfully attacked Narbonne, which was defended by its Goths, and Jews under the command of its governor Yusuf, 'Abd er-Rahman's heir. Having crushed the relief force at the River Berre, he left Narbonne isolated.
- around 747: The government of the Septimania region (and the Upper March, from the Pyrénées to the river Ebro) was given to Umar ibn Umar.
- 752: The Gothic counts of Nîmes, Melguelh, Agde and Béziers refused allegiance to the emir at Córdoba and declared their loyalty to the Frankish king. The count of Nîmes, Ansemund, had some authority over the remaining counts. The Gothic counts and the Franks then began to besiege Narbonne, where Miló was probably the count (as successor of the count Gilbert), but Narbonne resisted.
- 754: An anti-Frank reaction, led by Ermeniard, killed Ansemund, but the uprising was without success and Radulf was designated new count by the Frankish court.
- About 755: Abd ar-Rahman ibn Uqba replaced Umar ibn Umar.
- 759: Charles Martel's son, Pippin the Younger besieged Narbonne, which capitulated. The county was granted to Miló, who was the Gothic count in Muslim times.
- 760: The Franks took the region of Roussillon.
- 767: After the fight against Waifred of Aquitaine, Albi, Rouergue, Gévaudan, and the city of Toulouse were conquered.
- 777: The wali of Barcelona, Sulayman al-Arabi, and the wali of Huesca, Abu Taur, offered their submission to Charlemagne and also the submission of Husayn, wali of Zaragoza.
- 778: Charlemagne invaded the Upper March. Husayn refused allegiance and Charlemagne had to retreat.
- 778 August 15: In the Pyrenees, the Basques defeated Charlemagne's forces in the Roncesvalles
- Charlemagne found Septimania and the borderlands so devastated and depopulated by warfare, with the inhabitants hiding among the mountains, that he made grants of land that were some of the earliest identifiable fiefs to Visigothic and other refugees. He also founded several monasteries in Septimania, around which the people gathered for protection. Beyond Septimania to the south Charlemagne established the Hispanic Marches in the borderlands of his empire. Septimania passed to Louis, king in Aquitaine, but it was governed by Frankish margraves and then dukes (from 817) of Septimania.
- 826: The Frankish noble Bernat of Septimania (also, Bernat of Gothia) became ruler of Septimania and the Hispanic Marches and ruled them until 832. His career characterized the turbulent 9th century in Septimania. His appointment as Count of Barcelona in 826 occasioned a general uprising of the Catalan lords at this intrusion of Frankish power. For suppressing Berenguer of Toulouse and the Catalans, Louis the Pious rewarded Bernat with a series of counties, which roughly delimit 9th century Septimania: Narbonne, Béziers, Agde, Magalona, Nîmes and Uzés.
- 843: Bernard rose against Charles the Bald.
- 844: He was apprehended at Toulouse and beheaded.

== Postscript ==
Septimania became known as Gothia after the reign of Charlemagne. It retained these two names while it was ruled by the counts of Toulouse during the Early Middle Ages, but the southern part became more familiar as Roussillon and the west became known as Foix. The name "Gothia" (along with the older name "Septimania") faded away during the 10th century, except as a traditional designation as the region fractured into smaller feudal entities, which sometimes retained Carolingian titles, but lost their Carolingian character, as the culture of Septimania evolved into the culture of Languedoc.
