= Septimania =

Historical region in Southern France

Coordinates: 43.6°N 3.2°E

Map of Septimania in 537

Septimania is a historical region in modern-day Southern France. It referred to the western part of the Roman province of Gallia Narbonensis that passed to the control of the Visigoths in 462 CE, when Septimania was ceded to their king, Theodoric II. During the Early Middle Ages, the region was variously known as Gallia Narbonensis, Gallia, or Narbonensis. In modern-day France, the medieval territory of Septimania roughly corresponds to the former administrative region of Languedoc-Roussillon, along with the departments of Aude, Gard, Hérault, Lozère, and Pyrénées-Orientales. Languedoc-Roussillon and the Midi-Pyrénées were merged into the current administrative region of Occitania by the Government of the French Republic in 2016.

In the Visigothic Kingdom, a Romano-Germanic independent state that emerged after the collapse of the Western Roman Empire in the 5th century, which became centred on Toledo by the end of the reign of Leovigild, Septimania was both an administrative province of the central royal government and an ecclesiastical province whose metropolitan was the Archbishop of Narbonne. Originally, the Goths may have maintained their hold on the Albigeois, but if so it was conquered by the time of Chilperic I. There is archaeological evidence that some enclaves of Visigothic population remained in Frankish Gaul, near the Septimanian border, after 507. The region of Septimania was invaded by the Andalusian Muslims in 719, renamed as Arbūnah and turned into a military base for future operations by the Andalusian military commanders. It passed briefly to the Emirate of Córdoba, which had been expanding from the south during the same century, before its subsequent conquest by the Christian Franks in 759, who by the end of the 9th century renamed it as Gothia or the Gothic March (Marca Gothica). Eventually, the Christian Franks chased the Muslim Arabs and Berbers away from Septimania and conquered Narbonne in 759, and the Carolingian king Pepin the Short came up reinforced.

Septimania became a march of the Carolingian Empire and then West Francia down to the 13th century, though it was culturally and politically autonomous from the northern France-based central royal government. The region was under the influence of the people from the count territories of Toulouse, Provence, and ancient County of Barcelona. It was part of the wider cultural, historical, and ethno-linguistic region comprising the southern third of France, Occitania. This area was finally brought under effective control of the French kings in the early 13th century as a result of the Albigensian Crusade, after which it was assigned governors. Narbonne became a major center of Jewish learning in Western Europe. In the 12th century, the court of Ermengarde of Narbonne (r. 1134–1192) presided over one of the cultural centers where the spirit of courtly love was developed. From the end of the 13th century, Septimania evolved into the royal province of Languedoc.

== Etymology ==
The name "Septimania" may derive from the Roman name of the city of Béziers, Colonia Julia Septimanorum Baeterrae, which in turn alludes to the settlement of veterans of the Roman Seventh Legion in the city. The name could also be an allusion to the seven cities (civitates) of the territory: Agde, Béziers, Elne, Lodève, Villeneuve-lès-Maguelone, Narbonne, and Nîmes. Septimania extended to a line halfway between the Mediterranean, and the river Garonne in the northwest; in the east, the Rhône separated it from Provence; and to the south, its boundary was formed by the Pyrénées.

== Visigothic Narbonensis ==
=== Gothic acquisition ===
Under Theodoric II, the Visigoths settled in Aquitaine as foederati of the Western Roman Empire (450s). The Gallo-Roman aristocrat and bishop Sidonius Apollinaris refers to Septimania as "theirs" during the reign of Avitus (455–456), but Sidonius is probably considering Visigothic settlement in and around Toulouse. The Visigoths were then holding the area around Toulouse against the legal claims of the Empire, though they had more than once offered to exchange it for the Auvergne.

In 462, the remaining territory of the Western Roman Empire, controlled by the Romanized Germanic general Ricimer on behalf of Emperor Libius Severus, granted the Visigoths the western half of the province of Gallia Narbonensis in which to settle. The Visigoths additionally occupied Provence (eastern Narbonensis) and only in 475 did the Visigothic king, Euric, cede it to the Empire via a treaty whereby the emperor Julius Nepos recognised the Visigoths' full independence.

=== Visigothic Kingdom ===
The Visigoths, perhaps because they were Arian Christians, met with the opposition of the Catholic Franks in Gaul. The Franks allied with the Armorici, whose land was under constant threat from the Goths south of the Loire, and in 507 Clovis I, the Frankish king, invaded the Visigothic Kingdom, whose capital lay in Toulouse, with the consent of the leading men of the tribe. Clovis defeated the Goths in the battle of Vouillé (507) and the child-king Amalaric was carried for safety into Hispania, while Gesalec was elected to replace him and rule from Narbonne.

Clovis, his son Theuderic I, and his Burgundian allies proceeded to conquer most of the Visigothic territories in Gaul, including the Rouergue (507) and Toulouse (508). The attempt to take Carcassonne, a fortified site guarding the coast of Septimania, was defeated by the Ostrogoths (508) and Septimania thereafter remained in Visigothic hands, though the Burgundians managed to hold Narbonne for a time and drive Gesalec into exile. Border warfare between Gallo-Roman magnates, including Catholic bishops, had existed with the Visigoths during the last centuries of the Western Roman Empire, and it continued under the Franks.

The Ostrogothic king Theodoric the Great reconquered Narbonne from the Burgundians and retained it as the provincial capital. Theudis was appointed regent at Narbonne by Theodoric while Amalaric was still a minor in Hispania. In 509, Theodoric the Great created the first Germanic kingdom of Septimania, retaining its traditional capital at Narbonne. He appointed as his regent an Ostrogothic nobleman named Theudis. When Theodoric died in 526, Amalaric was elected king in his own right and he immediately made his capital in Narbonne. He ceded Provence, which had at some point passed back into Visigothic control, to the Ostrogothic king Athalaric. The Frankish king of Paris, Childebert I, invaded Septimania in 531 and chased Amalaric to Barcelona in response to pleas from his sister, Chrotilda, that her husband, Amalaric, had been mistreating her. The Franks did not try to hold the province, and, under Amalaric's successor, the centre of gravity of the kingdom crossed the Pyrénées and Theudis made his capital in Barcelona.

=== Gothic province of Gaul ===
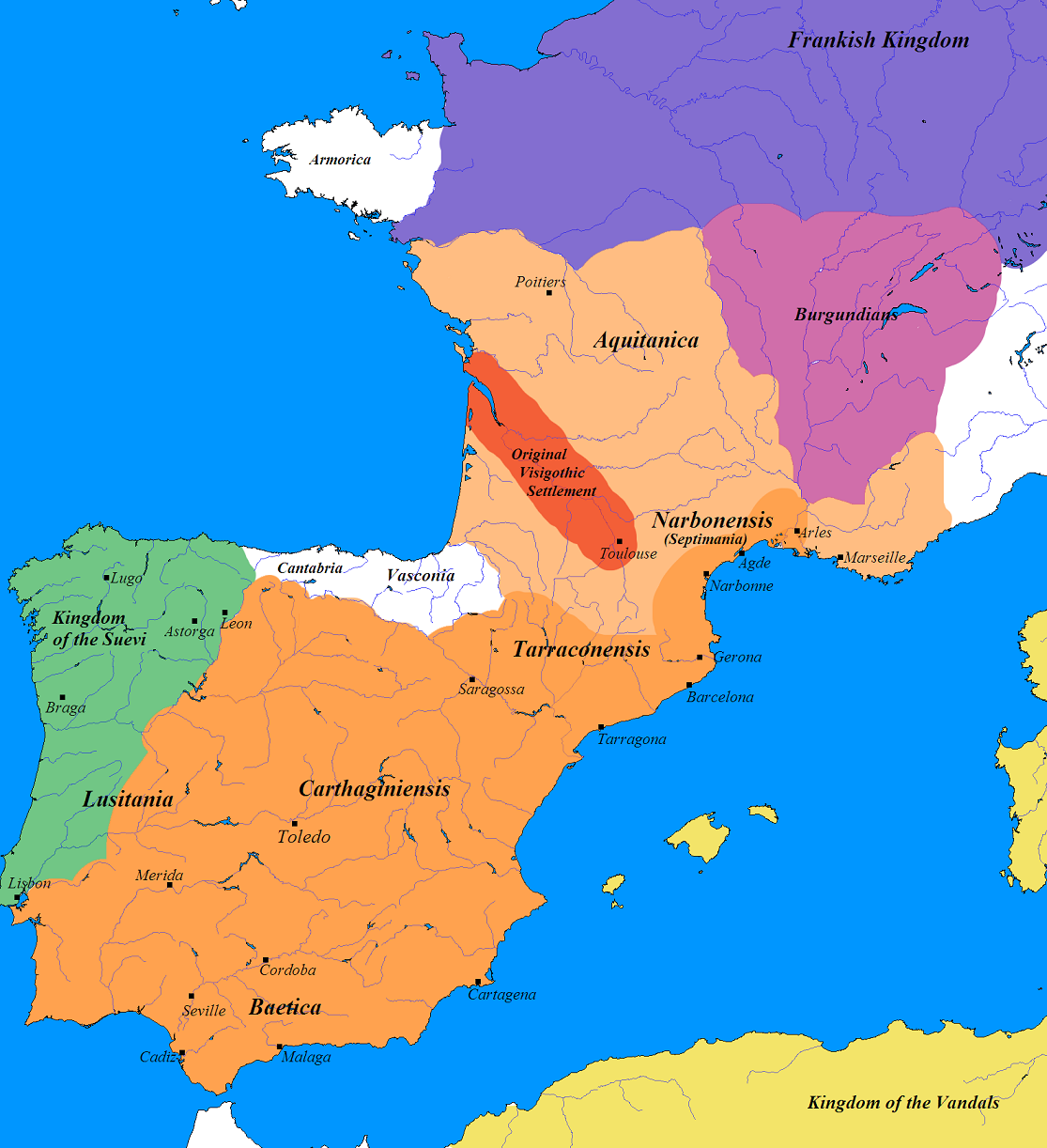
Barbarian kingdoms in Southwestern Europe during the Early Middle Ages: Visigothic Kingdom Roman province of Aquitanica I Kingdom of the Suebi Burgundians Frankish Kingdom Kingdom of the Vandals

In the Visigothic Kingdom, which became centred on Toledo by the end of the reign of Leovigild, the province of Gallia Narbonensis (usually shortened to just Gallia or Narbonensis and never called Septimania) was both an administrative province of the central royal government and an ecclesiastical province whose metropolitan was the Archbishop of Narbonne. Originally, the Goths may have maintained their hold on the Albigeois, but if so it was conquered by the time of Chilperic I. There is archaeological evidence that some enclaves of Visigothic population remained in Frankish Gaul, near the Septimanian border, after 507. In 534, Prince Theudebert I, son of the Merovingian king Theuderic I of Austrasia, invaded Septimania in concert with Prince Gunthar, son of the Frankish king Chlothar I. Gunthar stopped at Rodez and didn't progress with his troops further into Septimania, whereas Theudebert took and held the country as far as Béziers and Cabrières, from which he took the woman Deuteria as his first wife and future queen consort. Theudebert and his half-brother Childebert I invaded Hispania as far as Zaragoza (534–538). Eventually, the Visigoths regained the territory they had lost in Theudebert's invasion.

The province of Gaul held a unique place in the Visigothic Kingdom, as it was the only province outside of Hispania, north of the Pyrénées, and bordering a strong foreign nation, in this case the Franks. The kings after Alaric II favoured Narbonne as a capital, but twice (611 and 531) were defeated and forced back to Barcelona by the Franks, before Theudis moved the capital there permanently. Under Theodoric Septimania had been safe from Frankish assault, but was raided by Childebert I twice (531 and 541). When Liuva I succeeded to the throne in 568, Septimania was a dangerous frontier province and Hispania was wracked by revolts. Liuva granted Hispania to his son Leovigild and took Septimania to himself.

During the revolt of Hermenegild (583–585) against his father Leovigild, Septimania was invaded by Guntram, King of Burgundy, possibly in support of Hermenegild's revolt, since the latter was married to his niece Ingundis. The Frankish attack of 585 was repulsed by Hermenegild's brother Reccared, who was ruling Narbonensis as a sub-king. Hermenegild died at Tarragona that year and it is possible that he had escaped confinement in Valencia and was seeking to join up with his Frankish allies. Alternatively, the invasion may have occurred in response to Hermenegild's death. Reccared meanwhile took Beaucaire (Ugernum) on the Rhône near Tarascon and Cabaret (a fort called "Ram's Head"), both of which lay in Guntram's kingdom. Guntram ignored two pleas for a peace in 586 and Reccared undertook the only Visigothic invasion of Francia in response. However, Guntram was not motivated solely by religious alliance with the fellow Catholic Hermenegild, for he invaded Septimania again in 589 and was roundly defeated near Carcassonne by Claudius, Duke of Lusitania.

It is clear that the Franks, throughout the 6th century, had coveted Septimania, but were unable to take it and the invasion of 589 was the last attempt. In the 7th century, Gallia often had its own governors or duces (dukes), who were typically Visigoths. Most public offices were also held by Goths, far out of proportion to their part of the population.

=== Culture of Gothic Septimania ===
The native population of Gallia was referred to by Visigothic and Iberian writers as the "Gauls", and there is a well-attested hatred between the Goths and the Gauls, which was atypical for the Visigothic Kingdom as a whole. One of the most well-known and attested remnants of Gothic paganism and cultural autonomy in Septimania and other regions of the Visigothic Kingdom was the Visigothic Code (in medieval Latin: Lex Visigothorum), a Romanized Germanic set of over 500 laws and customs constructed by the Visigothic king Recceswinth (r. 649–672) and promulgated in 653, that the Gothic inhabitants and Visigothic rulers continued to preserve and uphold long into their inclusion within the Frankish Kingdom and the Carolingian Empire (8th century onwards). Thanks to the preserved canons of the Council of Narbonne of 590, a good deal can be known about surviving Gothic Pagan beliefs and practices in Visigothic Septimania. The Council may have been responding in part to the orders of the Third Council of Toledo, which found "the sacrilege of idolatry [to be] firmly implanted throughout almost the whole of Iberia and Septimania." The traditional Roman practice of not working Thursdays in honour of Jupiter was still prevalent.

The council set down penance to be done for not working on Thursday save for church festivals and commanded the practice of Martin of Braga, rest from rural work on Sundays, to be adopted. Also punished by the council were fortune-tellers, who were publicly lashed and sold into slavery. It is only in the time of the Visigothic king Wamba (r. 672–680) and Julian of Toledo, however, that a large Jewish population becomes evident in Septimania: Julian referred to it as a "brothel of blaspheming Jews."

Different theories exist concerning the nature of the frontier between Visigothic Septimania and Frankish Gaul. On the one hand, cultural exchange is generally reputed to have been minimal, but the level of trading activity has been disputed. There have been few to no objects of Neustrian, Austrasian, or Burgundian provenance discovered in Septimania. However, a series of Germanic sarcophagi of a unique regional style, variously labelled Visigothic, Aquitainian, or southwestern Gallic, are prevalent on both sides of the Septimanian border. These sarcophagi are made of locally quarried marble from Saint-Béat and are of varied design, but with generally flat relief which distinguishes them from ancient Roman sarcophagi. Their production has been dated to either the 5th, 6th, or 7th century, with the second of these being considered the most likely today.

A unique style of orange pottery was common in the 4th and 5th centuries in southern Gaul, but the later (6th century) examples culled from Septimania are more orange than their cousins from Aquitaine and Provence and are not found commonly outside of Septimania, a strong indicator that there was little commerce over the frontier or at its ports. In fact, Septimania helped to isolate both Aquitaine and Iberia from the rest of the Mediterranean world.

Coinage of the Visigothic Kingdom in Hispania did not circulate in Gaul outside of Septimania, and Frankish coinage did not circulate in the Visigothic Kingdom, including Septimania. If there had been a significant amount of commerce over the frontier, the monies paid had to have been melted down immediately and re-minted as foreign coins have not been preserved across the frontier.

== Frankish conquest of Septimania ==
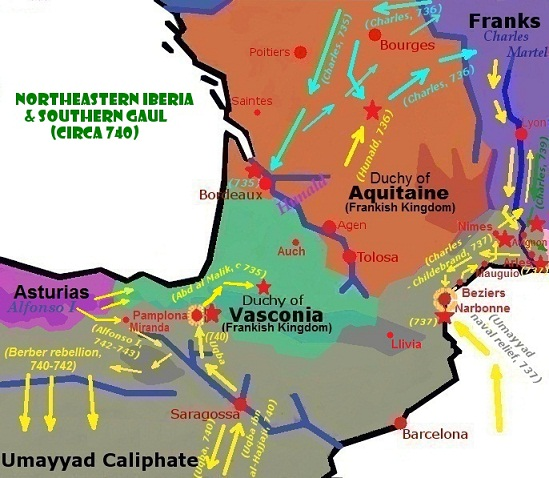
Military campaigns and geopolitical situation in southern Gaul (740)

The region of Septimania, in southern Gaul, was the last unconquered province of the Visigothic Kingdom. The incursion into Septimania was motivated by the need to secure their territorial gains in the Iberian Peninsula. Arab and Berber Muslim forces began to campaign in Septimania in 719. The Arab and Berber Muslim forces under al-Samh ibn Malik al-Khawlani, wāli (governor-general) of al-Andalus, sweeping up the Iberian peninsula, by 719 had invaded the region of Septimania and deposed the local Visigothic Kingdom in 720. The region was renamed Arbūnah and turned into a military base for future operations by the Andalusian military commanders. Following the Islamic invasion, al-Andalus was divided into five administrative areas, roughly corresponding to present-day Andalusia, Galicia, Lusitania, Castile and Léon, Aragon, and Catalonia.

By 721, al-Samh was reinforced and ready to lay siege to Toulouse, a possession that would open up the bordering region of Aquitaine, but his plans were thwarted in the disastrous battle of Toulouse in 721; the Aquitanian Christian army led by Odo the Great, Duke of Aquitaine, defeated the Umayyad Muslim army and achieved a decisive and significant victory. The surviving Umayyad forces drove away from Aquitaine with immense losses, in which al-Samh was so seriously wounded that he soon died at Narbonne. Arab and Berber Muslim forces, soundly based in Narbonne and easily resupplied by sea, struck in the 720s, conquering Carcassonne on the north-western fringes of Septimania (725). In 731, the Berber lord of the region of Cerdagne, Uthman ibn Naissa, called Munuza by the Franks, became an ally of Odo the Great after he had revolted against the Emirate of Córdoba, but the rebel lord was killed by the Arab Umayyad commander Abd al-Rahman ibn Abd Allah al-Ghafiqi.

After capturing Bordeaux on the wake of Duke Hunald's detachment attempt, the Carolingian king Charles Martel directed his attention to the regions of Septimania and Provence. While his reasons for leading a military expedition south remain unclear, it seems that he wanted to seal his newly secured grip on Burgundy, now threatened by Umayyad occupation of several cities lying in the lower Rhône, or maybe it provided the excuse he needed to intervene in this territory ruled by Visigothic and Roman laws, far off from the Frankish centre in the north of Gaul. Following the successful military campaigns of the Carolingian duke Charles Martel at the battle of Poitiers in 732 and the siege of Avignon in 737, the Frankish king went on to attack Narbonne, but the local nobility of Gothic and Gallo-Roman stock had concluded different military and political arrangements to oppose the expanding Frankish realm. However, when the Umayyads sent reinforcements from Muslim-ruled Iberia, the Frankish Christian army intercepted a sizeable group of Arab-Berber Muslim troops led by Uqba ibn al-Hajjaj along the banks of the River Berre (located in the present-day Department of Aude) and achieved a decisive and significant victory against the Umayyad invaders, after which the Frankish army marched on Nîmes. (Note: Remains of Islamic burials, presumably belonging to the Arab-Berber Muslim troops defeated by the Frankish Christian army led by Charles Martel at Narbonne and River Berre in 737, were discovered nearby Nîmes by a team of palaeontologists in 2016.) In the aftermath of their resounding victory against the relieving Arab-Berber Muslim forces, the Frankish Christian army pursued the fleeing Arab-Berber Muslim troops into the nearby sea-lagoons, "taking much booty and many prisoners". Martel's forces then devastated the principal Umayyad settlements of Septimania, as the Frankish army marched on Agde, Béziers, Maguelonne, and Nîmes.

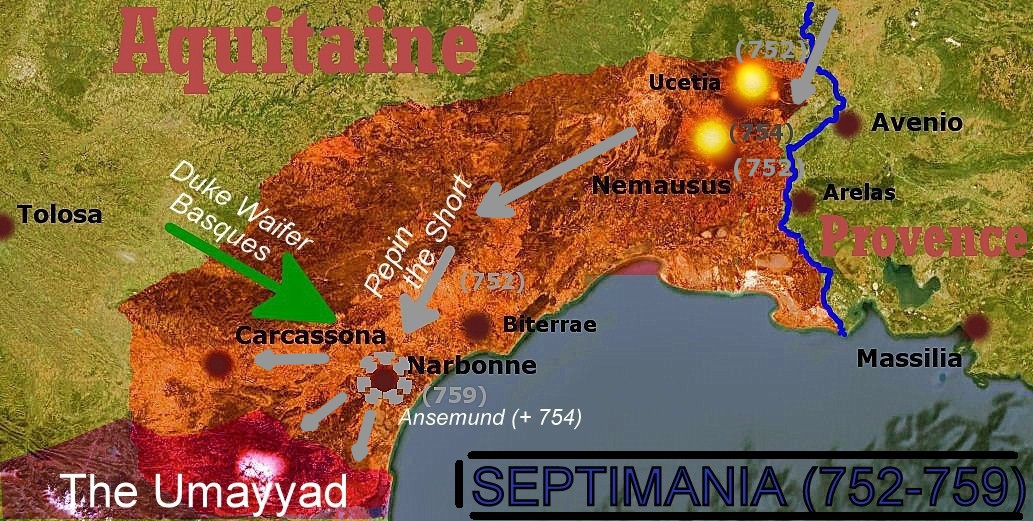
Septimania during Pepin's expedition and conquest (752–759)

Around 747, the government of the Septimania region (and the Upper March, from the Pyrénées to the Ebro River) was given to Umar ibn Umar. Umayyad rule collapsed by 750, as its breakdown was caused by the successful Abbasid revolution, and Umayyad territories in Southern Europe were ruled autonomously by Yusuf ibn 'Abd al-Rahman al-Fihri and his supporters. In 752, the Carolingian king Pepin the Short headed south to Septimania. The Gothic counts of Nîmes, Melguelh, Agde, and Béziers refused allegiance to the emir of Córdoba and declared their loyalty to the Frankish king—the Gothic count of Nîmes, Ansemund, having some authority over the remaining counts.

In 754, an anti-Frankish uprising led by Ermeniard killed Ansemund, but the uprising was unsuccessful, and Radulf of Narbonne was designated the new count by the Frankish court. About 755, Abd ar-Rahman ibn Uqba replaced Umar ibn Umar. In 759, Narbonne was not receiving reinforcements from al-Andalus, rife as it was with internal fights. Yusuf ibn 'Abd al-Rahman al-Fihri, wāli of al-Andalus, had to quash a rebellion in Zaragoza in 756, and immediately head south to fight Abd ar-Rahman I, who defeated him. Northeastern Iberia and the remainder of Septimania was left without any relevant commander in charge. Finally, the Gothic and Gallo-Roman inhabitants of Narbonne surrendered to the Frankish forces, eliminated the Andalusian garrison after killing the Arab-Berber Muslim troops, and opened the gates of the stronghold to the investing forces of the Carolingian king. Previously, the Frankish king Pepin had promised to uphold and respect the Visigothic law and probably their own government, so garnering the allegiance of the Gothic nobility of Septimania, including Miló, Gothic count of Narbonne.

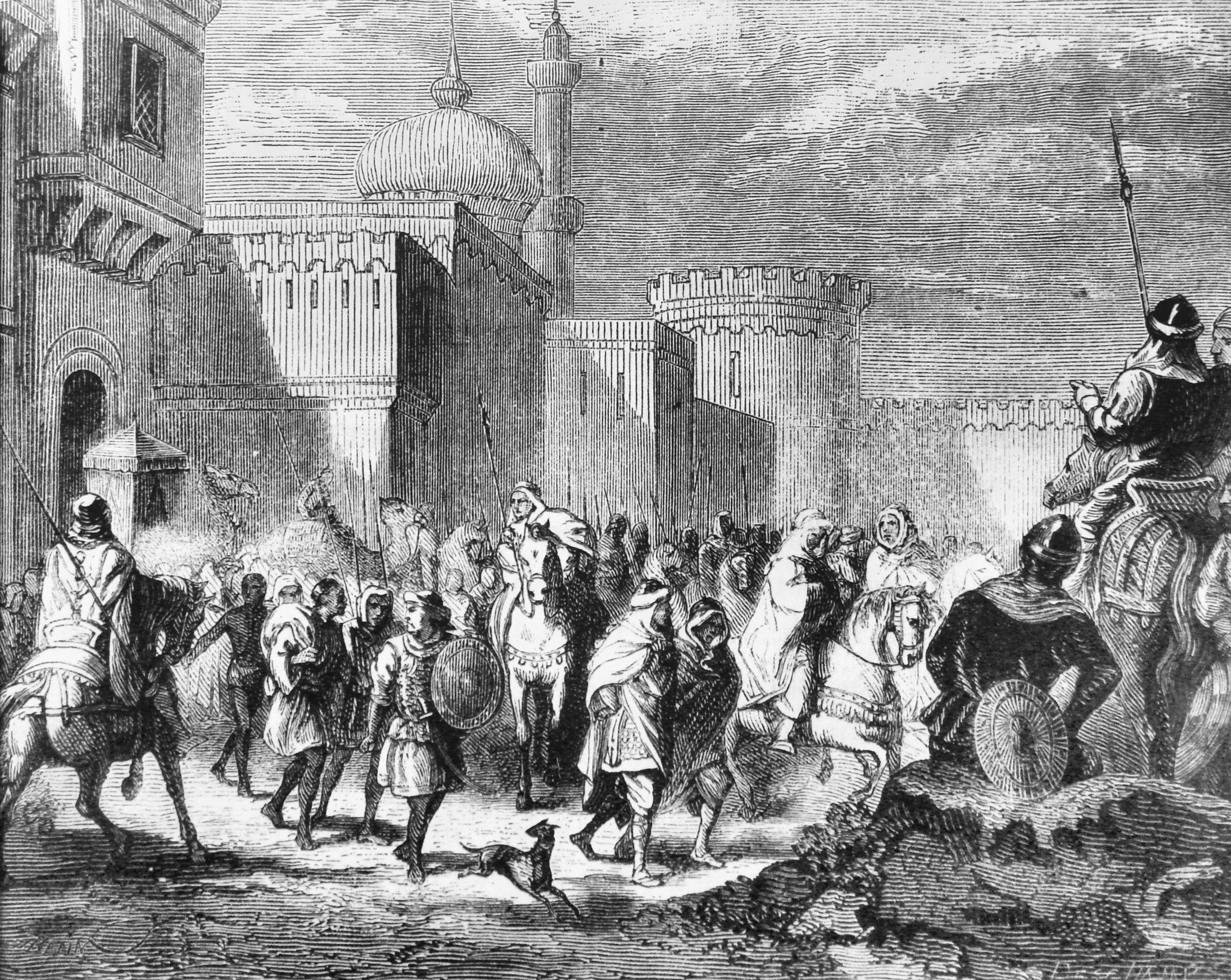
Arab and Berber Muslim troops retreating from Narbonne after the Frankish conquest of Septimania in 759. Illustration by Émile Bayard, 1880.

Narbonne capitulated to the Christian Franks in 759 only after Pepin promised the defenders of the city to uphold the Visigothic law, and the county was granted to Miló, Gothic count of Narbonne, thus earning the loyalty of Septimanian Goths against Duke Waifer, the independent ruler (princeps) of Aquitaine. After the Frankish conquest of Narbonne in 759, the Muslim Arabs and Berbers were defeated by the Christian Franks that proceeded to chase them away from Septimania, and the Carolingian king Pepin the Short came up reinforced. The siege remained as a key battlefield in the context of the Carolingian expedition south to Provence and Septimania starting in 752. The Iberian Christian counter-offensive known as the Reconquista began in the early 8th century, when Andalusian Muslim forces managed to temporarily push into Aquitaine. In the wake of Narbonne's submission, Pepin took Roussillon, and then directed his effort against Toulouse, Rouergue, and Albigeois in Aquitaine, leading to the battle for Aquitaine.

== Gothia in Carolingian times ==
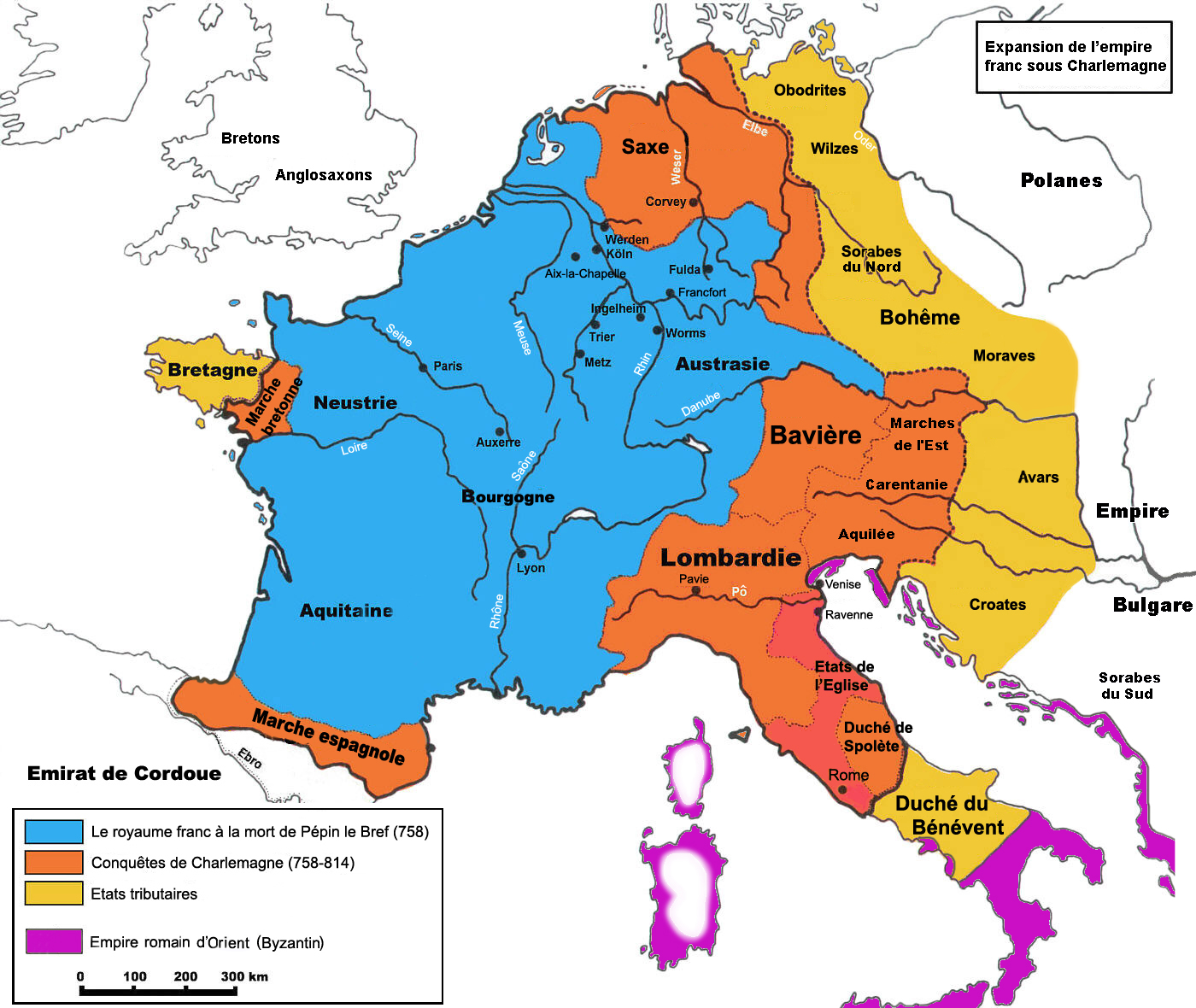
Expansion of the Frankish Empire: Realm of Pepin the Short in 758 Conquests under Charlemagne until 814 Marches and dependencies Papal States Byzantine Empire

The region of Roussillon was taken by the Franks in 760. Pepin then diverted northwest to Aquitaine, triggering the war against Waifer of Aquitaine. The cities of Albi, Rouergue, Gévaudan, and Toulouse were conquered as well. In 777, the wāli of Barcelona, Sulayman al-Arabi, and the wāli of Huesca, Abu Taur, offered their submission to Charlemagne and also the submission of Husayn, wāli of Zaragoza. When Charlemagne invaded the Upper March in 778, Husayn refused allegiance and he had to retire. In the Pyrénées, the Basques defeated his forces in Roncesvalles (August 15, 778). By the end of the 9th century, Septimania became a march of the Carolingian Empire and was renamed Gothia or Marca Gothica ("Gothic March").

The Frankish king found Septimania and the borderlands so devastated and depopulated by warfare, with the inhabitants hiding among the mountains, that he made grants of land that were some of the earliest identifiable fiefs to Visigothic and other refugees. Charlemagne founded several monasteries in Septimania, around which the people gathered for protection. Beyond Septimania to the southern border, Charlemagne established the Hispanic Marches in the borderlands of his empire. The territory passed to Louis the Stammerer, King of Aquitaine, but it was governed by Frankish margraves and then dukes from 817 onwards.

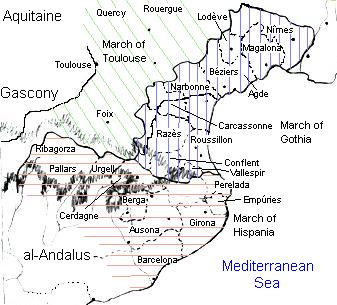
Marches of the eastern Pyrénées under the Carolingian Empire: Marca Gothica and Marca Hispanica.

The Frankish noble Bernat of Septimania was the ruler of these lands from 826 to 832. His career (he was beheaded in 844) characterized the turbulent 9th century in Septimania. His appointment as Count of Barcelona in 826 occasioned a general uprising of the Catalan lords (Bellonids) at this intrusion of Frankish power over the lands of Gothia. For suppressing Berenguer of Toulouse and the Catalans, Louis the Pious rewarded Bernat with a series of counties, which roughly delimit 9th century Septimania: Agde, Béziers, Villeneuve-lès-Maguelone, Narbonne, Nîmes, and Uzès. Rising against Charles the Bald in 843, Bernat was apprehended at Toulouse and beheaded. Bernat's son, known as Bernat of Gothia, also served as Count of Barcelona and Girona, and as Margrave of Gothia and Septimania from 865 to 878.

In the 11th and 12th centuries, Septimania was home to an important Jewish exegetical school, which played a pivotal role in the growth and development of the Zarphatic (Judæo-French) and Shuadit (Judæo-Provençal) languages in medieval France. Jews had settled in Narbonne from about the 5th century CE, with a community that numbered about 2,000 people in the 12th century. At this time, Narbonne was frequently mentioned in medieval Talmudic works in connection with its Jewish scholars. One source, Abraham ibn Daud of Toledo, gives them an importance similar to the Jewish exilarchs of Babylon. Furthermore, the Jewish community of Narbonne was home to the Benveniste and Kalonymos, two wealthy families of Sephardic Jewish scholars and noblemen established in medieval France, Germany, Spain, and other countries in Southern Europe. In the 12th and 13th centuries, the community went through a series of ups and downs before settling into extended decline.

Septimania became known as Gothia after the reign of Charlemagne. It retained these two names while it was ruled by the counts of Toulouse during early part of the Middle Ages, but other names became regionally more prominent such as, Roussillon, Conflent, Razès, or Foix, and the name Gothia (along with the older name Septimania) faded away during the 10th century, as the region fractured into smaller feudal entities, which sometimes retained Carolingian titles, but lost their Carolingian character, as the culture of Septimania evolved into the culture of Languedoc. This fragmentation in small feudal entities and the resulting fading and the gradual shifting of the name Gothia are the most probable origins of the ancient geographical area known as Gathalania or Cathalania which has reached our days as the present region of Catalonia. The more common name Gothia was used because the area was populated by a higher concentration of Goths than in surrounding regions. The rulers of this area, when joined with several counties, were titled as marquesses of Gothia and dukes of Septimania.

== Modern-day France ==
=== World War II ===
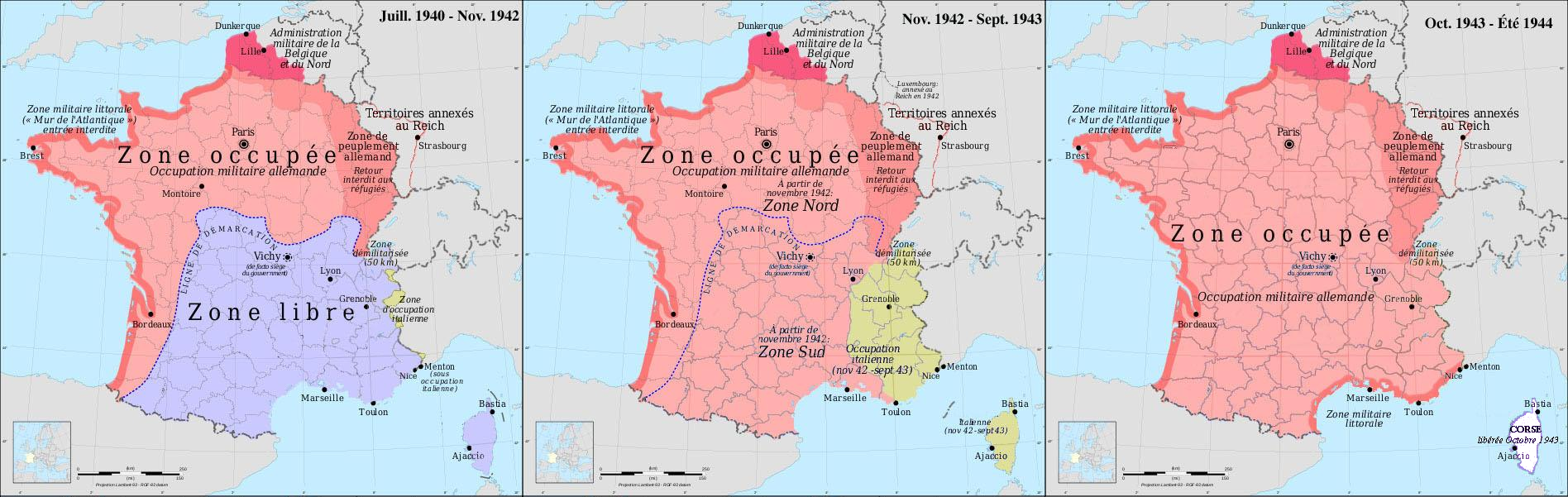
Progressive end of the Vichy Regime (1940–1944)

On 10 May 1940, France was invaded by Nazi Germany. French Prime Minister Paul Reynaud resigned rather than sign an armistice, and was replaced by French Marshal Philippe Pétain. Shortly thereafter, Pétain signed the Armistice of 22 June 1940 with Nazi Germany. At Vichy, Pétain established an authoritarian dictatorship that reversed many liberal policies, began a tight supervision of the economy, and launched an ideological campaign called Révolution nationale in Nazi-occupied France.

German Chancelllor Adolf Hitler ordered Case Anton to occupy Corsica and then the rest of the unoccupied southern zone in immediate reaction to the landing of the Allied forces in North Africa on 8 November 1942. Following the conclusion of the operation on 12 November, Vichy's remaining military forces were disbanded. Vichy continued to exercise its remaining jurisdiction over almost all of metropolitan France, with the residual power devolved into the hands of Laval, until the gradual collapse of the regime following the Allied invasion of France in June 1944. On 7 September 1944, in the aftermath of the Allied victory, the remnants of the Vichy government cabinet fled to Nazi Germany and established a puppet government in exile in the so-called Sigmaringen enclave. That rump government finally fell when the city was taken by the Free French Army in April 1945.

Part of the residual legitimacy of the Vichy Regime resulted from the continued ambivalence of the United States and other Allied powers. For instance, U.S. President Franklin D. Roosevelt continued to cultivate bilateral relations with the Vichy Regime and promoted French General Henri Giraud as a preferable alternative to Charles de Gaulle, despite the poor performance of Vichy military forces in North Africa. French Admiral François Darlan had landed in Algiers the day before Operation Torch; the city hosted the headquarters of the Vichy French 19th Army Corps, which controlled Vichy military units in North Africa. Darlan was neutralised within 15 hours by a 400-strong French resistance force. Both Roosevelt and Winston Churchill accepted Darlan, rather than de Gaulle, as the French leader in North Africa. De Gaulle had not even been informed of the landing in North Africa. The United States also resented the Free French Army taking control of Saint Pierre and Miquelon on 24 December 1941, because, U.S. Secretary of State Cordell Hull believed, it interfered with a U.S.–Vichy agreement to maintain the status quo with respect to French territorial possessions in the Western Hemisphere.

Following the Allied invasion of France via Normandy and Provence (Operation Overlord and Operation Dragoon, respectively) and the departure of the Vichy leaders, the United States, the United Kingdom, and the Soviet Union finally recognized the Provisional Government of the French Republic (GPRF) headed by de Gaulle as the legitimate government of France on 23 October 1944. Before that, the first return of parliamentary democracy to metropolitan France since 1940 had occurred with the declaration of the Free Republic of Vercors on 3 July 1944, at the behest of Free France, but that act of resistance was quashed by an overwhelming German attack by the end of July. The new republic of France was founded on 27 October 1946.

=== French Republic ===
In modern-day France, Septimania or Gothia was comprised within the former administrative region of Languedoc-Roussillon, along with the departments of Aude, Gard, Hérault, and Pyrénées-Orientales, which roughly correspond to the historical region of medieval Septimania, as well as the geographically completely different department of Lozère, which belongs to the Massif Central. On 1 January 2016, it joined with the region of Midi-Pyrénées to become Occitania.

After his election to the Regional Council in 2004, Georges Frêche, a member of the French Socialist Party (PS), campaigned for the renaming of Languedoc-Roussillon to Septimania, and the Regional Assembly began to use the region's medieval name more frequently. However, he met with widespread opposition by its citizens, particularly among Catalans, who feared the loss of Catalan identity in favor of a single Occitan identity belonging to Occitans for the entire region.

Eventually, the inhabitants of the Languedoc-Roussillon and Pyrénées-Orientales organized a mass protest against Frêche's campaign, with more than 5000 people gathered in Perpignan on 8 October 2005. Due to their fierce resistance, Frêche was finally forced to abandon his intention two weeks later. He served as President of the Regional Council of Languedoc-Roussillon from 2004 until his death in 2010; prior to that, he had been mayor of Montpellier for 27 years.

== See also ==
- A Jewish Princedom in Feudal France
- Bierzo Edict
- Communes of the Aude department
- Corbières AOC
- Gothic Wars
- Historia de regibus Gothorum, Vandalorum et Suevorum
- Medieval history of the Kingdom of France
- Praetorian prefecture of Gaul
- Royal Frankish Annals
- Timeline of Septimania

== Bibliography ==
- Bachrach, Bernard S. (1971). Merovingian Military Organization, 481–751. Minneapolis: University of Minnesota Press.
- Collins, Roger (1989). The Arab Conquest of Spain, 710–97. Oxford University Press.
- Collins, Roger (2004). Visigothic Spain, 409–711. Blackwell Publishing.
- James, Edward (1980). "Septimania and its frontier: an archaeological approach". In Edward James (ed.). Visigothic Spain: New Approaches. Oxford: Clarendon Press.
- Jiménez Garnica, Ana M. (2003) [1999]. "Settlement of the Visigoths in the Fifth Century". In Heather, Peter J. (ed.). The Visigoths from the Migration Period to the Seventh Century: An Ethnographic Perspective. Studies in Historical Archaeoethnology. Vol. 4. Woodbridge, Suffolk: Boydell Press. pp. 93–115. ISBN 978-1-84383-033-7.
- Lewis, Archibald Ross (1965). The Development of Southern French and Catalan Society, 718–1050. Austin, TX: University of Texas Press.
- McKenna, Stephen (1938). Paganism and Pagan Survivals in Spain up to the Fall of the Visigothic Kingdom. Catholic University of America Press.
- O'Callaghan, Joseph F. (1983). A History of Medieval Spain. Cornell University Press.
- Thompson, E. A. (1969). The Goths in Spain. Oxford: Clarendon Press.
- Zuckerman, Arthur J. (1972) [1965]. A Jewish Princedom in Feudal France 768–900. New York: Columbia University Press. ISBN 978-0-231-03298-8.
