= Siege of Narbonne (752–759) =

Frankish expedition and conquest of Septimania

- Part of the Islamic invasion of Gaul
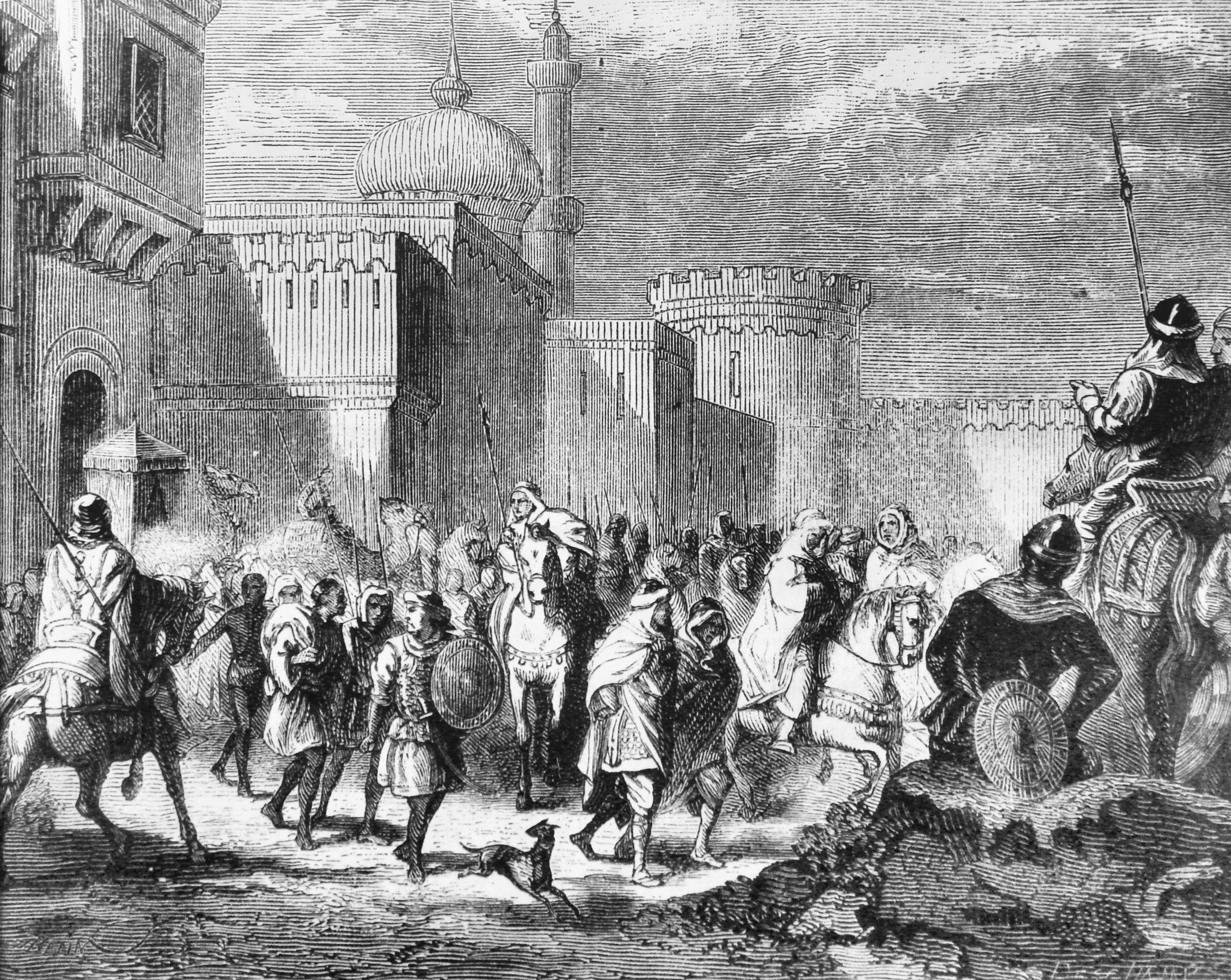
- Arab and Berber Muslim troops retreating from Narbonne after the Frankish conquest in 759. Illustration by Émile Bayard, 1880.
Date	752–759
Location	Narbonne 43.1836°N 3.0042°E
Result	Decisive Frankish Christian victory
Territorial changes	Elimination of Arab-Berber Muslim troops by the city's Gothic and Gallo-Roman inhabitants.; Frankish conquest of Septimania.

Belligerents
Al-Andalus (752–56); Emirate of Córdoba (756–59)	Kingdom of Francia; Septimanian Visigoths

Commanders and leaders
Yusuf ibn Abd al-Rahman al-Fihri (752–756); Abd al-Rahman I (756–759)	Pepin the Short; Ansemund †

Strength
7,000	29,000

Casualties and losses
Unknown	Unknown
- Location in France

The siege of Narbonne took place in France between 752 and 759, led by the Frankish king Pepin the Short against the Umayyad temporary camp defended by a small garrison of Arab and Berber Muslim troops who had invaded Septimania and occupied the Visigothic Kingdom and its Gallo-Roman inhabitants since 719. The siege remained as a key battlefield in the context of the Carolingian expedition south to Provence and conquest of Septimania starting in 752.

The region of Septimania was up to that point in the hands of Andalusi military commanders and the local Visigothic and Gallo-Roman nobility, who had concluded different military and political arrangements to oppose the expanding Frankish realm. Umayyad rule collapsed by 750, and Umayyad territories in Europe were ruled autonomously by Yusuf ibn Abd al-Rahman al-Fihri and his supporters.

== Background ==
The region of Septimania, in southern Gaul, was the last unconquered province of the Visigothic Kingdom. The incursion into Septimania was motivated by the need to secure their territorial gains in Iberia. Arab and Berber Muslim forces began to campaign in Septimania in 719.

The region of Septimania was invaded by al-Samh ibn Malik al-Khawlani, wāli (governor-general) of al-Andalus, in 719, and subsequently occupied by the Arab and Berber Muslim forces in 720. The region was renamed Arbūnah and turned into a military base for future operations by the Andalusian military commanders.

By 721, al-Samh was reinforced and ready to lay siege to Toulouse, a possession that would open up the bordering region of Aquitaine to him on the same terms as Septimania. But his plans were thwarted in the disastrous battle of Toulouse in 721; the Aquitanian Christian army led by Odo the Great, Duke of Aquitaine defeated the Umayyad Muslim army and achieved a decisive and significant victory. The surviving Umayyad forces drove away from Aquitaine with immense losses, in which al-Samh was so seriously wounded that he soon died at Narbonne.

Arab and Berber Muslim forces, soundly based in Narbonne and easily resupplied by sea, struck in the 720s, conquering Carcassonne on the north-western fringes of Septimania (725) and penetrating eastwards as far as Autun (725). In 731, the Berber lord of the region of Cerdagne, Uthman ibn Naissa, called Munuza by the Franks, was an ally of the Duke of Aquitaine Odo the Great after he revolted against the Emirate of Córdoba, but the rebel lord was killed by the Arab Umayyad commander Abd al-Rahman ibn Abd Allah al-Ghafiqi. Following his success at the siege of Avignon in 737, Charles Martel sieged Narbonne but his forces were unable to take the city, after which the Frankish army marched on Nîmes, Agde, and Béziers.

== Approaches ==
During the Early Middle Ages, an Andalusian garrison of Arab and Berber Muslim troops invaded the region of Septimania in 719 and deposed the local Visigothic Kingdom in 720. In 752, after the Carolingian king Pepin the Short obtained the Pope's recognition and the dignity of King of the Franks and deposing the last Merovingian king, Pepin felt free to focus all his might on subduing the Septimania and Provence.

After capturing Bordeaux on the wake of Duke Hunald's detachment attempt, the Carolingian king Charles Martel directed his attention to Septimania and Provence. While his reasons for leading a military expedition south remain unclear, it seems that he wanted to seal his newly secured grip on Burgundy, now threatened by Umayyad occupation of several cities lying in the lower Rhône, or maybe it provided the excuse he needed to intervene in this territory ruled by Visigothic and Roman law, far off from the Frankish centre in the north of Gaul. In 737, the Frankish king went on to attack Narbonne, but the local nobility of Gothic and Gallo-Roman stock had concluded different military and political arrangements to oppose the expanding Frankish realm. Charles Martel attempted to conquer the whole region of Septimania and sieged Narbonne in 737 but his forces were unable to take the city. However, when the Arabs sent reinforcements from Muslim-ruled Iberia, the Frankish Christian army intercepted them at the mouth of the River Berre (located in the present-day Département of Aude) and achieved a decisive and significant victory, after which the Frankish army marched on Nîmes.

While the Gothic magnates did not support the Franks formerly, things were changing this time: Nîmes, Agde, and Béziers were handed over to him by the Gothic count Ansemund. Mauguio surrendered too. Count Miló was at the time ruling in Narbonne as a vassal of the Andalusians, but when Ansemund handed over several cities to Pepin, Miló did not join, probably deterred by the Arab-Berber Muslim garrison stationed in the city.

== Start of the siege ==
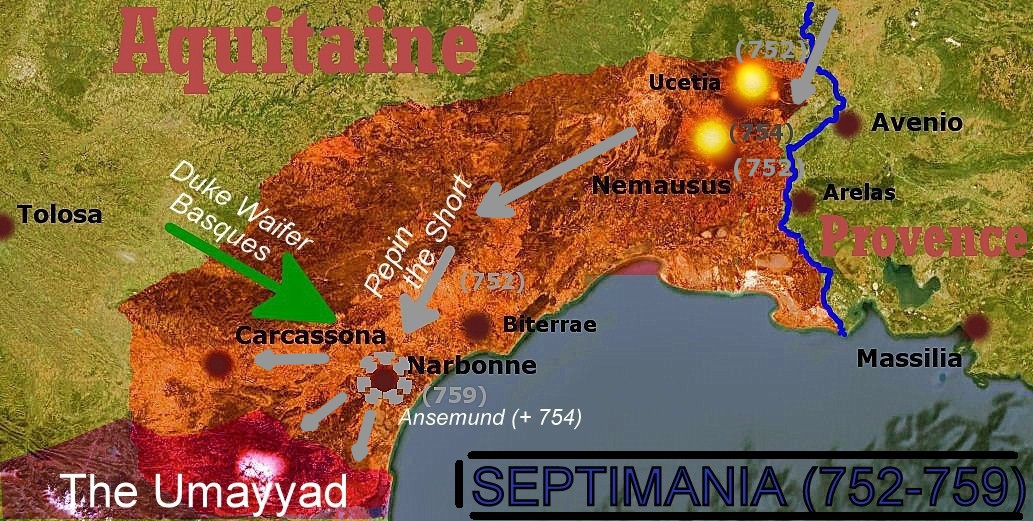
Septimania during Pepin's expedition and conquest (752–759)

The Frankish king Pepin the Short finally lay siege to the Gothic-Andalusian Narbonne in 752 with a view to seizing it with no delay. However, Pepin suffered a major blow when his main local, Gothic ally Ansemund was killed by a rival Gothic faction during the sieging operations in 754. The death of the count was followed by a revolt in Nîmes that was put down by Pepin, and a Frankish governor imposed. Furthermore, the Aquitanian rival duke Waifer is recorded about this period leading an army of Basques against the Carolingian king on the rearguard of his siege of Narbonne. The Narbonnese garrison and residents were able to withstand Pepin's siege thanks to the supplies provided by sea by the Andalusian navy.

== Frankish conquest of Narbonne ==
In 759, Narbonne was not receiving reinforcements from al-Andalus, rife as it was with internal fights. Yusuf ibn 'Abd al-Rahman al-Fihri, wali of al-Andalus, had to quash a rebellion in Zaragoza in 756, and immediately head south to fight Abd ar-Rahman I, who defeated him. Northeastern Iberia and the remainder of Septimania was left without any relevant commander in charge. Finally, the Gothic and Gallo-Roman defenders of Narbonne surrendered to the Frankish forces, proceeding to eliminate the Andalusian garrison after killing the Arab-Berber Muslim troops, and opening the gates of the stronghold to the investing forces of the Carolingian king. Previously, the king Pepin had promised to uphold and respect the Gothic laws and probably their own government, so garnering the allegiance of the Gothic nobility of Septimania.

== Aftermath ==
After the Frankish conquest of Narbonne in 759, the Muslim Arabs and Berbers were defeated by the Christian Franks and expelled to their Andalusian heartland after 40 years of occupation, and the Carolingian king Pepin the Short came up reinforced. The government of the city was assigned to the Gothic count Miló, who had fled the city five years before when it was besieged, and had retreated to Trausse (Aude). The submission of Septimania allowed the Frankish king to divert his attention to his only remaining opponent, duke Waifer, the independent ruler (princeps) of Aquitaine. In the wake of Narbonne's submission, Pepin took Roussillon, and then directed his effort against Toulouse, Rouergue, and Albigeois in Aquitaine, leading to the battle for Aquitaine.
