= Radulf of Narbonne =

Frankish noble

Radulf was a Frankish military chief or official imposed as count of Nimes by Pepin the Short after suppressing an anti-Frankish revolt in 754. The Gothic Septimanian uprising took place following the assassination of Ansemund, probably by order of the Frankish king.

== See also ==
- Septimania
- Islamic invasion of Gaul
