= Siege of Nîmes =

8th-century siege in France

Coordinates: 43.836699°N 4.360054°E

The siege of Nîmes took place shortly after the capture and destruction of Avignon in 737. Charles Martel failed to capture the Umayyad city of Narbonne but devastated most of the other principal settlements of Septimania, including Nîmes, Agde, Béziers and Maguelonne, which he viewed as potential strongholds of the Saracens.

The city of Nîmes (Chronicle of Fredegar) and the Roman amphitheatre (turned into a fortress by the Visigoths) were destroyed under the orders of Charles Martel.

The Arabs were temporarily contained to the city of Narbonne, though a second expedition was needed later that year to regain control of Provence after Arab forces returned. According to Paul the Deacon's Historia Langobardorum the Arabs retreated when they learned that Martel had formed an alliance with the Lombards. Martel's remaining years - he had only four to live - were spent setting up and strengthening the administrative structure that became the Carolingian Empire, and the feudal state that would persist through the Dark Ages. His son would return in 759 and finish his father's work by taking Narbonne.
