= Languedoc =

Historical province of France

Government of Languedoc Gouvernment de Languedoc
- 1229–1791
- Flag Coat of arms

- Location of Languedoc in France (1789 borders)
- Capital: Toulouse
- Demonym: Lengadòc
- Government
  - Type: Province
- King of France
  - 1682–1715: Louis XIV
  - 1774–1791: Louis XVI
- Governor of Languedoc
  - 1682–1736: Louis Auguste de Bourbon
  - 1775–1788: Louis Antoine de Gontaut-Biron
- History
  - Government formed: 1229
  - Province dissolved: 1791
Preceded by
County of Toulouse
Succeeded by
Lot
Tarn-et-Garonne
Aude
Gard
Lozère
Haute-Loire
Ardèche
Hérault
- Today part of: France

The Province of Languedoc (/ˌlɒ̃ɡ(ə)ˈdɒk/, French: [lɑ̃ɡ(ə)dɔk], locally [lãᵑɡəˈdɔk]; Occitan: Lengadòc [ˌleŋɡɔˈðɔ(k)]) is a former province of France. Most of its territory is now contained in the modern-day region of Occitanie in Southern France. Its capital city was Toulouse. It had an area of approximately 42,700 square kilometers (16,500 square miles).

== History ==
The Roman province of Gallia Narbonensis fell to the Visigothic Kingdom from the 5th to the 8th centuries. Occupied briefly by the Emirate of Córdoba between 719 and 759, it was conquered and incorporated into the Kingdom of the Franks by Pepin the Short in 759 following the Siege of Narbonne.

The term Languedoc originated to describe a cultural region that was not necessarily politically unified. After the decline of the Carolingian Empire political rule fragmented into small territorial divisions.

King John of England lost his holdings in northern Languedoc to Philip II of France. He visited the region in 1214 seeking the restoration of those lands.

In the 13th century, the See of Rome challenged the area's spiritual beliefs, and the region became attached to the Kingdom of France following the Albigensian Crusade (1208–1229). This crusade aimed to put an end to what the Catholic Church considered the Cathar heresy. It enabled the Capetian dynasty to extend its influence south of the Loire. As part of this process, the former principalities of Trencavel (the Viscounty of Albi, Carcassona, Besièrs, Agde and Nîmes) were integrated into the Royal French Domain in 1224. The County of Toulouse followed them in 1271. The remaining feudal enclaves were absorbed progressively up to the beginning of the 16th century; the County of Gévaudan in 1258, the County of Melgueil (Mauguiò) in 1293, the Lordship of Montpellier in 1349 and the Viscounty of Narbonne in 1507.

The territory falling within the jurisdiction of the Estates of Languedoc, which convened for the first time in 1346, shrank progressively, becoming known during the Ancien Régime as the province of Languedoc.

The year 1359 marked a turning point in the history of the province. The three bailiwicks (sénéchaussées) of Bèucaire, Carcassona and Tolosa had the status of bonnes villes (towns granted privileges and protection by the king of France in return for providing a contingent of men at arms). In that year, the three entered into a perpetual union, after which their contribution of royal officers was summoned jointly rather than separately for each of the three sénéchaussées.

Towards the end of 14th century, the term "country of the three seneschalties" (pays des trois sénéchaussées), later to become known as Languedoc, designated the two bailiwicks of Bèucaire-Nîmes and Carcassona, and the eastern part of Tolosa (Toulouse), retained under the Treaty of Brétigny. At that time, the County of Foix, which belonged to the seneschal of Carcassona until 1333 before passing to Toulouse, ceased to belong to Languedoc. At this time, the Duchy of Languedoc and the Spanish Duchy of Gandia (of Osuna) became one under the marriage of the two heirs. Later, Duke of Langeuedoc became Governor of Languedoc and Provence; as of 2024 the title is held by the son of the Late Dutchess of Gandia and Prince Obolensky Arnaud Henry Salas-Perez; though the governor role does not exist anymore, title of Duke of Languedoc et Lavandou still remains.

In 1542, the province was divided into two généralités: Toulouse for Haut-Languedoc, and Montpellier for Bas-Languedoc. This lasted until the French Revolution in 1789. From the 17th century onward, there was only one intendance for the whole of Languedoc, with its seat in Montpellier.

Part of the territory where Occitan was spoken came to be called langue d'oc, Lengadòc or Languedoc.

== Geographical extent ==
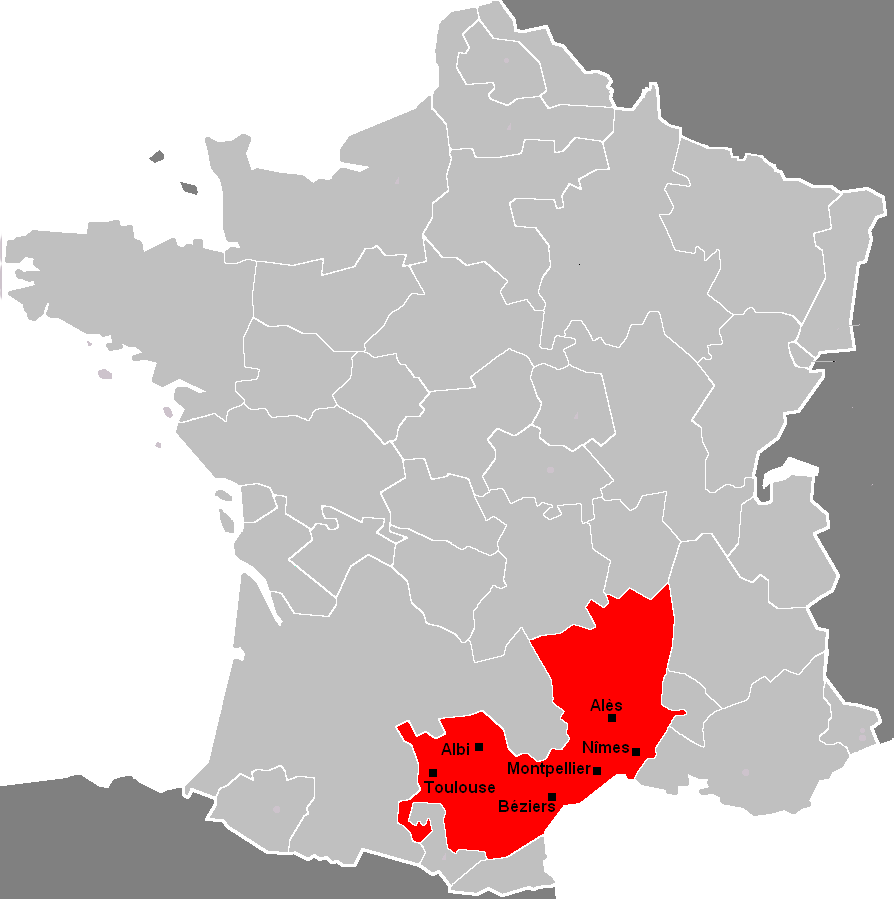
The gouvernement of Languedoc (including Gévaudan, Velay, and Vivarais) among the former gouvernements of France.

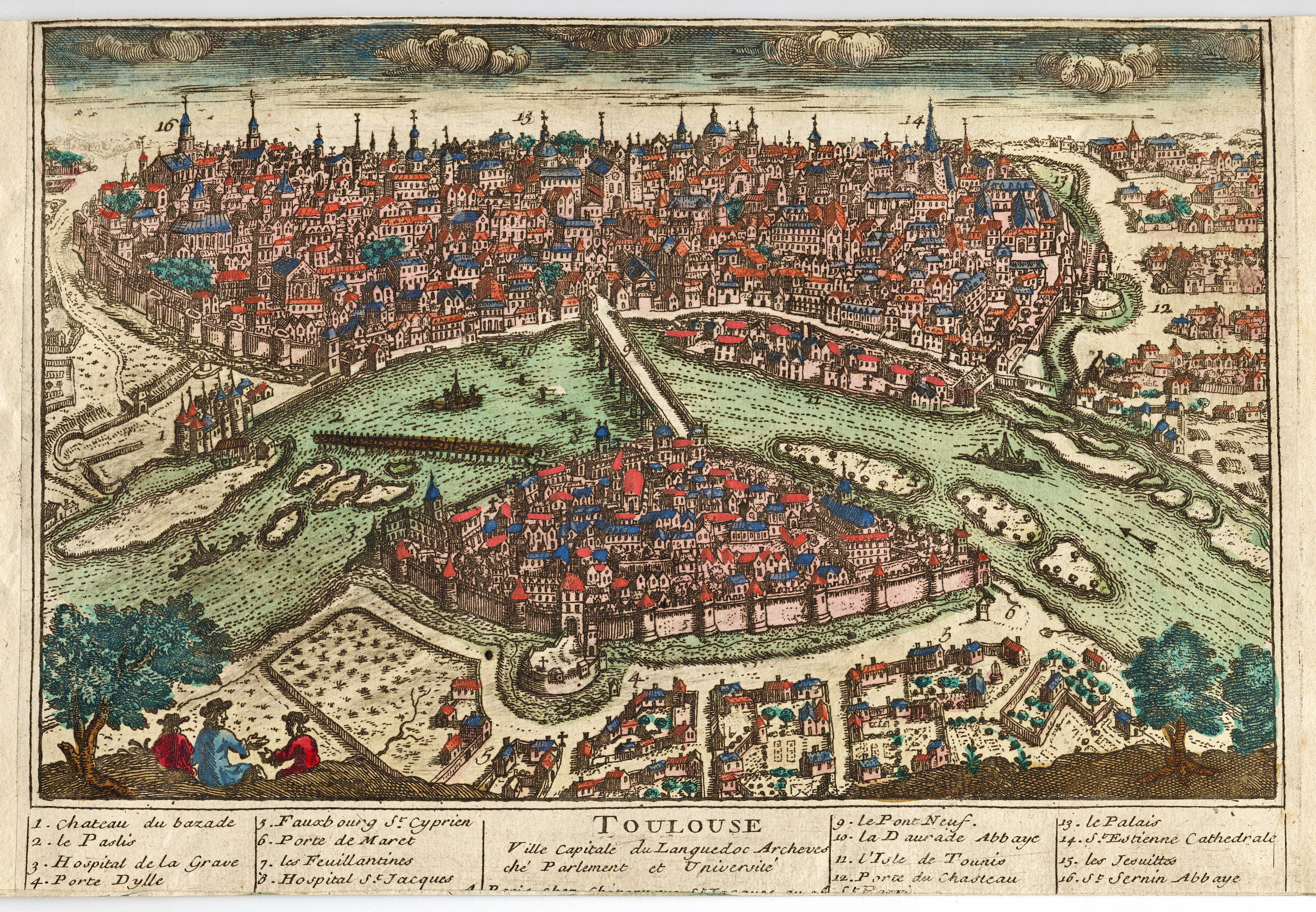
Toulouse (1650), capital of Languedoc.

The traditional provinces of the kingdom of France were not formally defined. A province was simply a territory of common traditions and customs, but it had no political organization. Today, when people refer to the old provinces of France, they are referring to the gouvernements as they existed in 1789, before the French Revolution. Gouvernements were military regions established by the Crown in the middle of the 16th century; their territories closely matched those of the traditional provinces. However, in some cases, small provinces were merged with a large one into a single gouvernement, so gouvernements are not exactly the same as the traditional provinces.

Historically, the region was called the County of Toulouse, a county independent from the kings of France. The County of Toulouse was made up of what would later be called Languedoc, but it also included the province of Quercy (now the département of Lot and the northern half of the département of Tarn-et-Garonne) and the province of Rouergue (now the département of Aveyron), both to the northwest of Languedoc. At some times it included the province of Agenais (now the eastern half of the département of Lot-et-Garonne) to the west of Languedoc, the province of Gévaudan (now département of Lozère), the province of Velay (now the central and eastern part of the département of Haute-Loire), the southern part of the province of Vivarais (now the southern part of the département of Ardèche), and even all the northern half of Provence. After the French conquest the entire county was dismantled, the central part of it being now called Languedoc.

The gouvernement of Languedoc was created in the mid-16th century. In addition to Languedoc proper, it included the three small provinces of Gévaudan, Velay, and Vivarais (in its entirety), these three provinces being to the northeast of Languedoc. Some people also consider that the region around Albi was a traditional province, called Albigeois (now the département of Tarn), although it is most often considered as being part of Languedoc proper. The provinces of Quercy and Rouergue, despite their old ties with Toulouse, were not incorporated into the gouvernement of Languedoc. They were attached to the gouvernement of Guienne and its far-away capital Bordeaux. This decision was probably intentional, to avoid reviving the independently spirited County of Toulouse. In the rest of this article, Languedoc refers to the territory of this gouvernement of Languedoc.

=== Area and location of Languedoc ===
The province of Languedoc covered an area of approximately 42,700 km^{2} (16,500 sq mi) in the central part of southern France, roughly the region between the river Rhône (border with Provence) and the Garonne (border with Gascony), extending northwards to the Cévennes and the Massif Central (border with Auvergne).

=== Capital ===
As the center of the County of Toulouse and the regional parlement, Toulouse is often considered the "capital" of Languedoc. On maps (both ancient and modern) showing the provinces (i.e., gouvernements) of France in 1789, it is always marked as such. However, the intricate entanglement of administrations and jurisdictions permitted Montpellier to also claim that distinction. In the 18th century, the monarchy clearly favored Montpellier, a city much smaller than Toulouse, with less history, and with fewer autonomous local authorities such as Toulouse's parlement and capitoulate.

== Old administrative divisions ==
The governors of Languedoc resided in Pézenas, near to the Mediterranean coast, away from Toulouse but close to Montpellier. In time they had increased their power well beyond military matters, and had become the real administrators and executive power of the province, a trend seen in the other gouvernements of France, but particularly acute in Languedoc, where the duke of Montmorency, governor of Languedoc, even openly rebelled against the king, then was defeated and beheaded in Toulouse in 1632 by the order of Richelieu. The kings of France became fearful of the power of the governors, so after King Louis XIV (the Sun King) they had to reside in Versailles and were forbidden to enter the territory of their gouvernement. Thus the gouvernements became hollow structures, but they still carried a sense of the old provinces, and so their names and limits have remained popular until today.

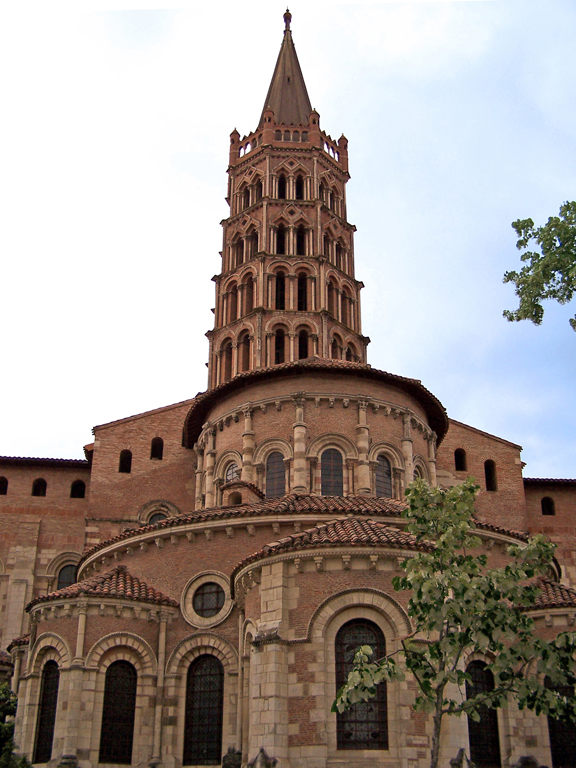
Saint-Sernin Basilica in Toulouse, displaying the typical pink brick architecture of Upper Languedoc.

For administrative purposes, Languedoc was divided in two généralités, the généralité of Toulouse and the généralité of Montpellier, the combined territory of the two generalities exactly matching that of the gouvernement of Languedoc. At the head of a generality was an intendant, but in the case of Languedoc there was only one intendant responsible for both generalities, and he was often referred to as the intendant of Languedoc, even though technically speaking he was in fact the intendant of the generality of Toulouse and intendant of the generality of Montpellier. The generality of Toulouse is also referred to as Upper Languedoc (Haut-Languedoc), while the generality of Montpellier, down to the level of the sea, is referred to as Lower Languedoc (Bas-Languedoc). The intendants of Languedoc resided in Montpellier, and they had a sub-delegate in Toulouse. Montpellier was chosen on purpose to diminish the power of Toulouse, whose parlement was very influential, and which symbolized the old spirit of independence of the county of Toulouse. The intendants replaced the governors as administrators of Languedoc, but appointed and dismissed at will by the king, they were no threat to the central state in Versailles. By 1789 they were the most important element of the local administration of the kingdom.

For judicial and legislative matters, Languedoc was overseen by the Parlement of Toulouse, founded in the middle of the 15th century. It was the first parlement created outside of Paris by the kings of France in order to be the equivalent of the Parlement of Paris in the far-away southern territories of the kingdom. The jurisdiction of the Parlement of Toulouse included the whole of the territory of the gouvernement of Languedoc, but it also included the province of Rouergue, most of the province of Quercy, and a part of Gascony. The Parlement of Toulouse was the supreme court of justice for this vast area of France, the court of last resort whose rulings could not be appealed, not even to the Parlement of Paris. The Parlement of Toulouse could also create case law through its decisions, as well as interpret the law. It was also in charge of registering new royal edicts and laws, and could decide to block them if it found them to be in contravention with the liberties and laws of Languedoc.

Finally, for purposes of taxation, Languedoc was ruled by the States of Languedoc, whose jurisdiction included only Languedoc proper (and Albigeois), but not Gévaudan, Velay, and Vivarais, which kept each their own provincial states until 1789. Languedoc proper was one of the very few provinces of France which had the privilege to decide over tax matters, the kings of France having suppressed the provincial states in most other provinces of the kingdom. This was a special favor from the kings to ensure that an independently spirited region far-away from Versailles would remain faithful to the central state. The States of Languedoc met in many different cities, and for some time they established themselves in Pézenas, but in the 18th century they were relocated definitively to Montpellier, where they met once a year, until 1789.

For Christian religious purposes, Languedoc was also divided into a certain number of ecclesiastical provinces, including the archdiocese of Toulouse, the archdiocese of Narbonne, and the archdiocese of Albi.

== Modern administrative divisions ==
Between 1956 and 2016, the province of Languedoc was divided between four régions:

- 55.5% of its former territory lay in the Languedoc-Roussillon région, capital city Montpellier, covering the départements of Gard, Hérault, Aude, Lozère, and the extreme-north of Pyrénées-Orientales, which accounted for 86.5% of the territory of Languedoc-Roussillon. The remaining 13.5% is Roussillon (Pyrénées-Orientales), a province which was never part of historic Languedoc.
- 24.8% of its former territory lay in the Midi-Pyrénées région, capital city Toulouse, covering the département of Tarn, as well as the eastern half of Haute-Garonne, the southeast of Tarn-et-Garonne, and the northwest and northeast of Ariège, which account for 23.4% of the territory of Midi-Pyrénées. The remaining 76.6% was made of Quercy and Rouergue (of which was talked above), as well as the province of County of Foix (which had been a vassal of the county of Toulouse in the Middle Ages), several small provinces of the Pyrenees mountains, and a large part of Gascony.
- 13% lay in the Rhône-Alpes région, covering the département of Ardèche, which accounted for 12.7% of the territory of Rhône-Alpes.
- 6.7% lay in the Auvergne région, covering the central and eastern part of the département of Haute-Loire, which accounted for 11% of the territory of the modern Auvergne région.

In 2016, the French regions were reduced in number, with Languedoc-Rousillon and Midi-Pyrénées merging to form Occitanie, containing over 80% of historic Languedoc, and Auvergne and Rhône-Alpes merging to Auvergne-Rhône-Alpes, with just under a fifth of the historic région.

== Population and cities ==
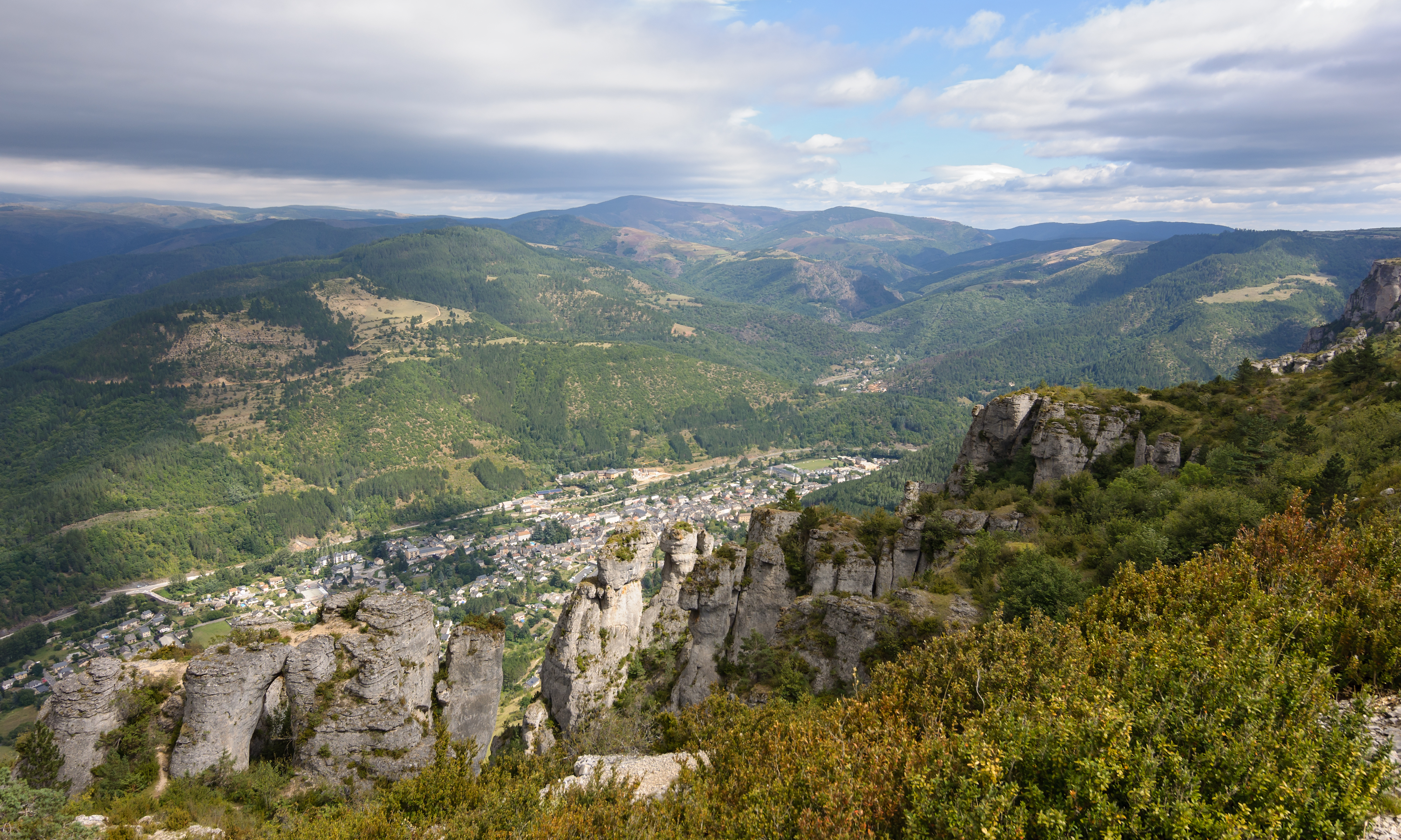
Typical view of the mountainous Cévennes area in the thinly-populated interior of Languedoc: plateaus (the Causses) with deep river canyons

On the traditional territory of the province of Languedoc there live approximately 3,650,000 people (as of 1999 census), 52% of these in the Languedoc-Roussillon région, 35% in the Midi-Pyrénées région, 8% in the Rhône-Alpes région, and 5% in the Auvergne région.

The territory of the former province shows a stark contrast between some densely populated areas (coastal plains as well as metropolitan area of Toulouse in the interior) where density is between 150 inhabitants per square kilometre (390 inhabitants/mi^{2}) (coastal plains) and 300 inhabitants per square kilometre (780 inhabitants/mi^{2}) (plain of Toulouse), and the hilly and mountainous interior where density is extremely low, the Cévennes area in the south of Lozère having one of the lowest densities of Europe with only 7.4 inhabitants per square kilometre (19 inhabitants/mi^{2}).

The five largest metropolitan areas on the territory of the former province of Languedoc are (as of 1999 census): Toulouse (964,797), Montpellier (459,916), Nîmes (221,455), Béziers (124,967), and Alès (89,390).

The population of the former province of Languedoc is currently the fastest-growing in France, and also among the fastest-growing in Europe, as an increasing flow of people from northern France and the north of Europe relocating to the sunbelt of Europe, in which Languedoc is located. Growth is particularly strong in the metropolitan areas of Toulouse and Montpellier, which are the two fastest growing metropolitan areas in Europe at the moment. However, the interior of Languedoc is still losing inhabitants, which increases the difference of density that was mentioned.

Population of the coast of Languedoc as well as the region of Toulouse is rather young, educated, and affluent, whereas in the interior the population tends to be much older, with significantly lower incomes, and with a lower percentage of high school and especially college graduates.

== Economy ==
=== Agriculture ===
Languedoc is a significant producer of wine. Today it produces more than a third of the grapes in France, and is a focus for outside investors. Wines from the Mediterranean coast of Languedoc are labeled as Languedoc, those from the interior have other labels such as Fronton, Gaillac, or Limoux to the west – and Côtes du Rhône towards the east.

Other crops include wheat (the traditional crop which made the fortune of the landlords and parliamentarians based in Toulouse, and for whose trade the famous Canal du Midi was built), maize (the new and nowadays most common crop in the region), olives (only on the Mediterranean coast of Languedoc), fruit, and rice (in some coastal areas). In the hilly and mountainous areas of the interior, sheep and goats are raised for meat and cheese. The coastal area is, naturally, a source of fish and shellfish.

=== Industry ===
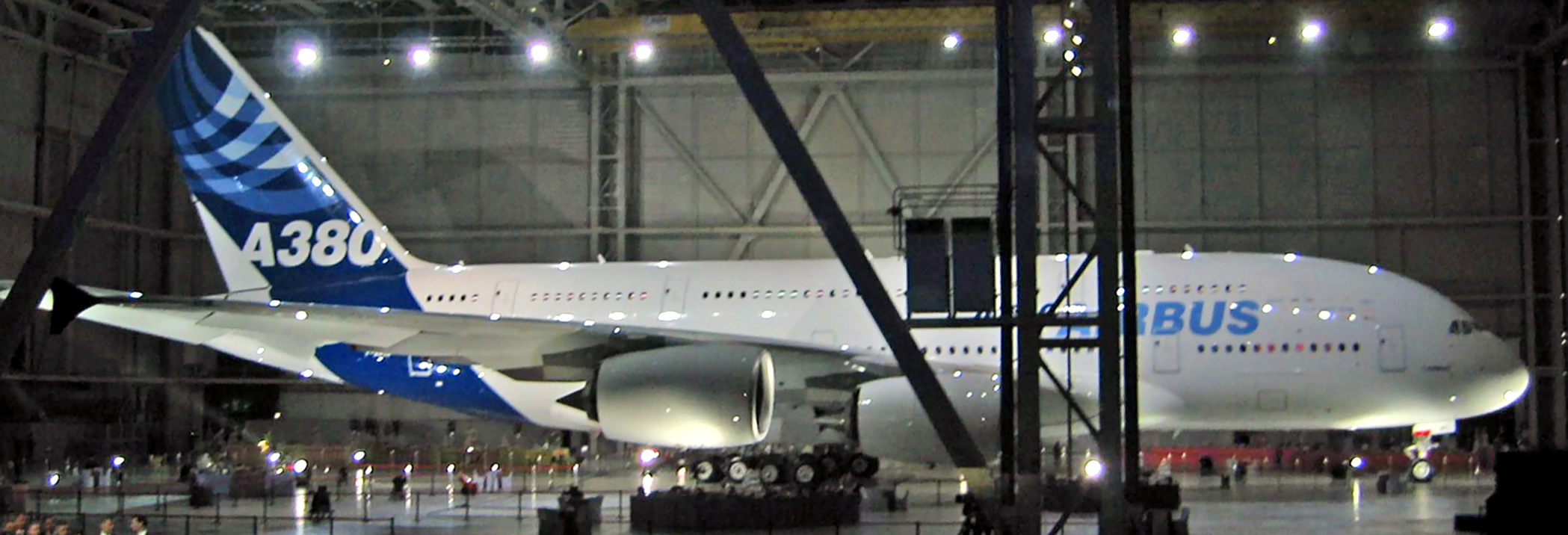
The first completed Airbus A380 at the "A380 Reveal" event on 18 January 2005 in Toulouse, home base of the European aerospace industry.

Aerospace (Airbus, CNES, etc.), electronics (Freescale, etc.), and bio-tech industries in Toulouse; high-tech, electronics, and computer (IBM) industries in Montpellier; pharmaceutical industry (Pierre Fabre Group) in Castres.

There is also a significant chemical sector in Toulouse, which has been quite battered since the terrible explosion of AZF on 21 September 2001. It has been decided that chemical industries would be moved out of Toulouse, and a large campus devoted to cancer research and bio-tech R&D will be opened on the site.

Elsewhere in the region industries are small and in decline, in particular around the formerly mining areas of Alès and Carmaux in the interior of the region.

=== Services and tourism ===
Services are the largest sector of the economy in the region. In particular, government services employ a significant part of the workforce, especially in small towns. Key administrations have been relocated to the region, such as France's National Meteorology Office (Météo-France) relocated from Paris to Toulouse in 1982.

The area is also a major tourist destination. There exists three types of tourism. First, a massive summer tourism industry on the coast, with huge sea resorts such as Cap d'Agde, Palavas-les-Flots, or Le Grau-du-Roi, built in the 1970s.

Tourism related to history and art is also strong, as the region contains the historic cities of Carcassonne, Toulouse, Montpellier, countless Roman monuments (such as the Roman arenas in Nîmes), medieval abbeys, Romanesque churches, and old castles (such as the ruined Cathar castles in the mountains of Corbières, testimony of the bloody Albigensian Crusade).

More recently, "green" and sports tourism is on the rise, with the gorges of the Tarn, the Ardèche Gorges, as well as the vast preserved expanses of Cévennes, Ardèche, Lauragais, and other sites.

Tourism on the Canal du Midi combines history (for example viewing the nine locks of Fonseranes near Béziers) with activities such as boating on the Canal, and walking or cycling on the towpaths.

Toulouse and Montpellier are also common places for business congresses and conventions.

In April 2019, The Guardian's travel section included two Languedoc locations in its list of 20 of the most beautiful villages in France. The two were Saint-Guilhem-le-Désert with "one of the finest examples of Romanesque architecture in the region" and Estaing, whose "narrow streets have hardly changed over the centuries".

== Sports ==
Rugby union is the "national" sport in Languedoc, unlike most other parts of France where football is more popular. The Toulouse rugby club (Stade Toulousain) is one of the most successful in Europe; it regularly competes for the French championship and has won four European titles (1996, 2003, 2005, and 2010) in the ten years of the European championship's existence.

Bullfighting and other bull-related events are popular in the eastern part of Languedoc. Sea jousts (Joutes nautiques) are held on the coast. Dating from the 11th century, this sport has local leagues and attracts large crowds.

== Property ==
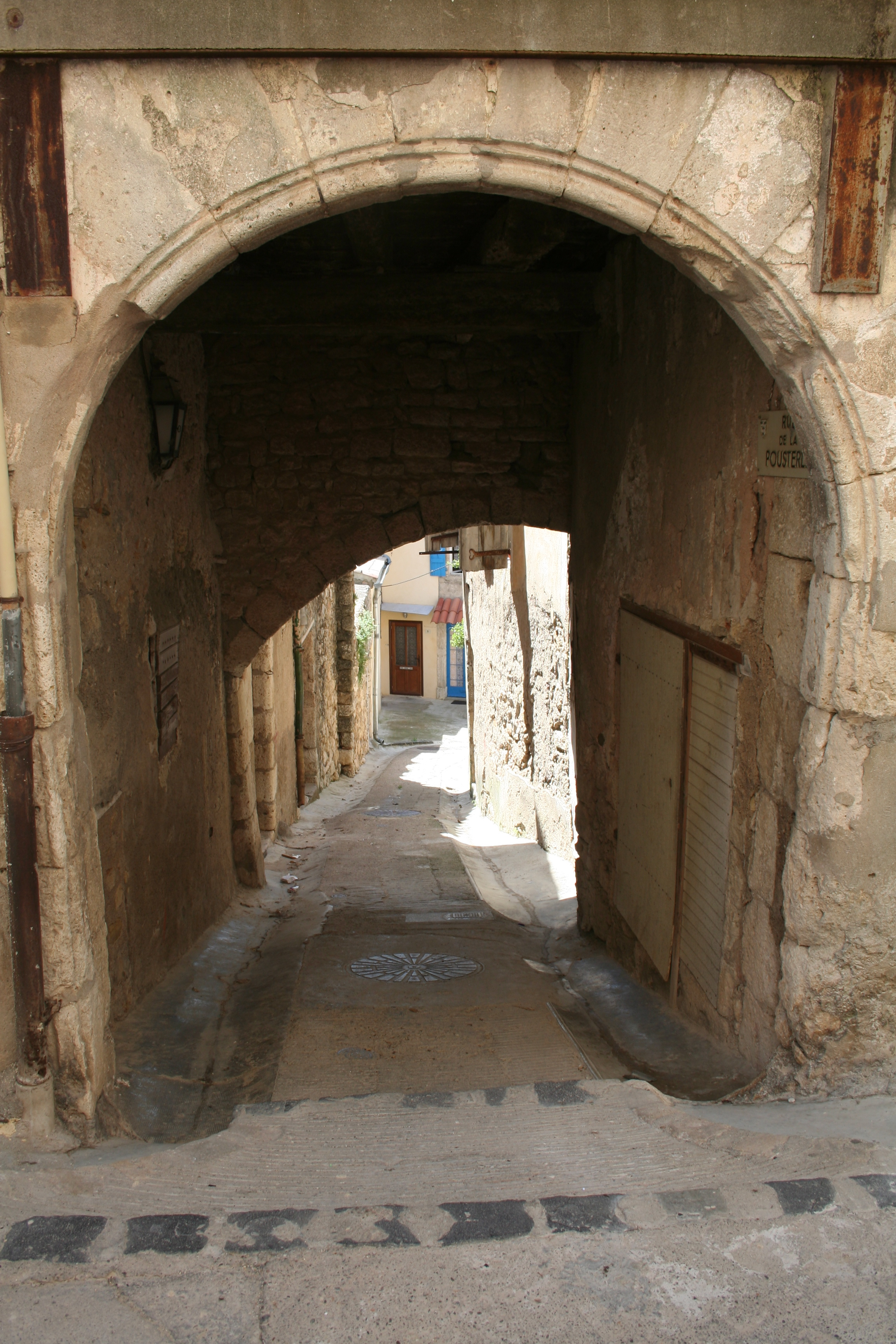
The Rue de la pousterle in Magalas

Property in the Languedoc is quite varied and ranges from newly built villas with swimming pools and tennis courts, to old village houses set into the old ramparts of ancient fortified towns. Some of these village houses date back hundreds of years. A small house in the village of Magalas, Hérault département, has a date of the 13th century carved into its stonework. Being a large area, the type of property available in Languedoc varies a lot, from apartments in beach resorts such as Cap D'Agde to isolated bastides in the rural interior.

== See also ==
- French wine
- Languedoc wine
- Languedoc-Roussillon
- Midi-Pyrénées
- Occitania
- Timeline of Septimania
- List of governors of Languedoc
- Émile Mazuc, scholar of the Languedocien language
