= Milo of Narbonne =

Milo of Narbonne (fl. 752–782) was the Count of Narbonne, who was ruling in 752, successor probably of Gilbert. It seems that he was in favour of the Franks, but, as there was a Muslim garrison in Narbonne, he didn't follow Ansemund, Count of Nimes in his allegiance to the Frankish Kingdom. The Goth counts and the Franks started to besiege Narbonne. Milo left the city toward Trausse, near Caunes, awaiting the result of the struggle. The Muslim troop resisted for about seven years. Narbonne capitulated in 759 and then the Frankish granted the county to Milo.

During the reign of the juvenile King Louis the Pious of Aquitaine in 782, Milo took advantage of the absence of the archbishop Daniel of Narbonne, who was on a pilgrimage to the Holy Land, to claim certain fiefs as his own. Despite having persuaded Charlemagne initially, Milo was compelled to make restitutions to Daniel after Arluin, curator of the diocese, brought suit against him.
