= 2004 Languedoc-Roussillon regional election =

- 21 March 2004 (first round); 28 March 2004 (second round)
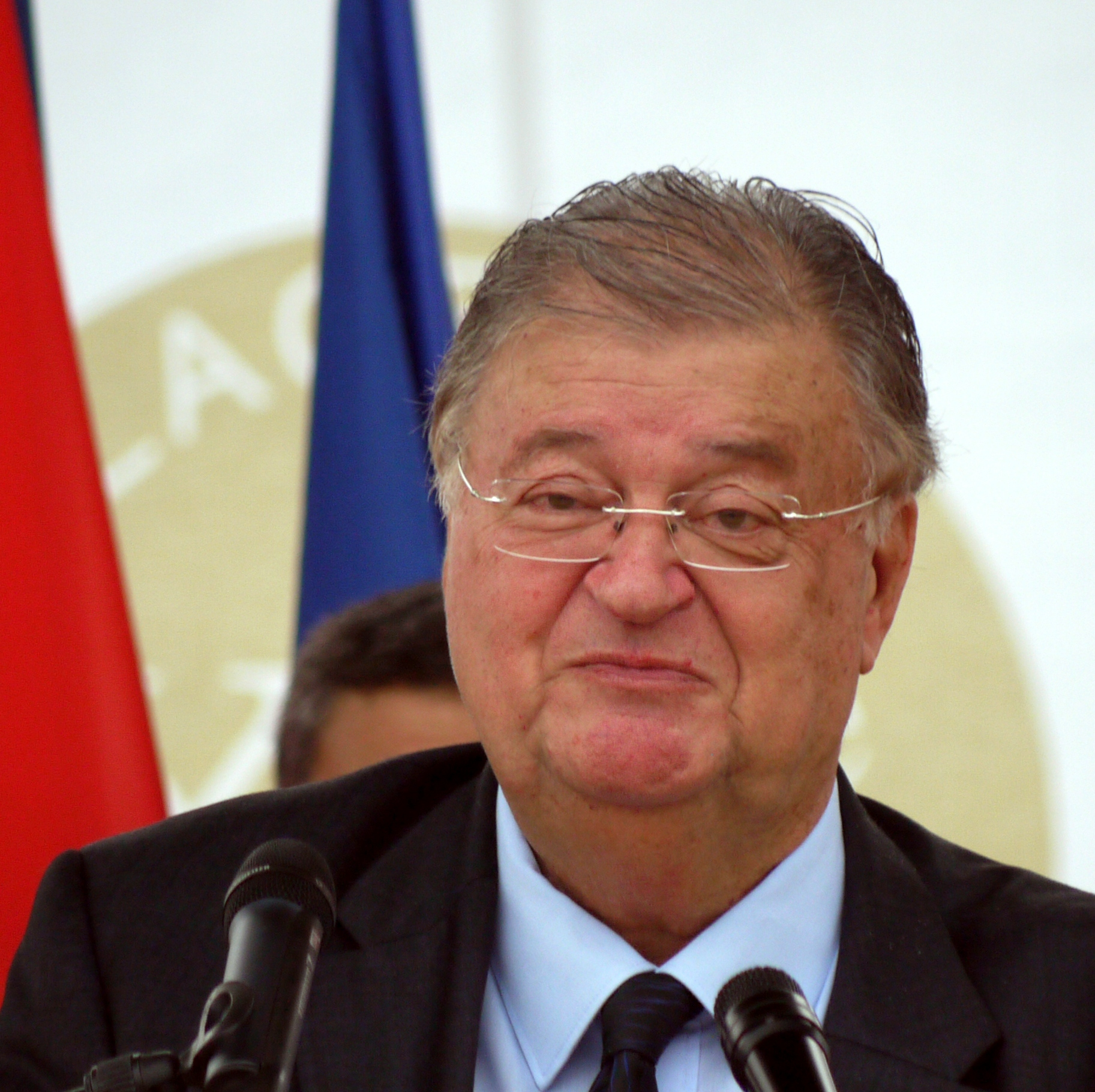

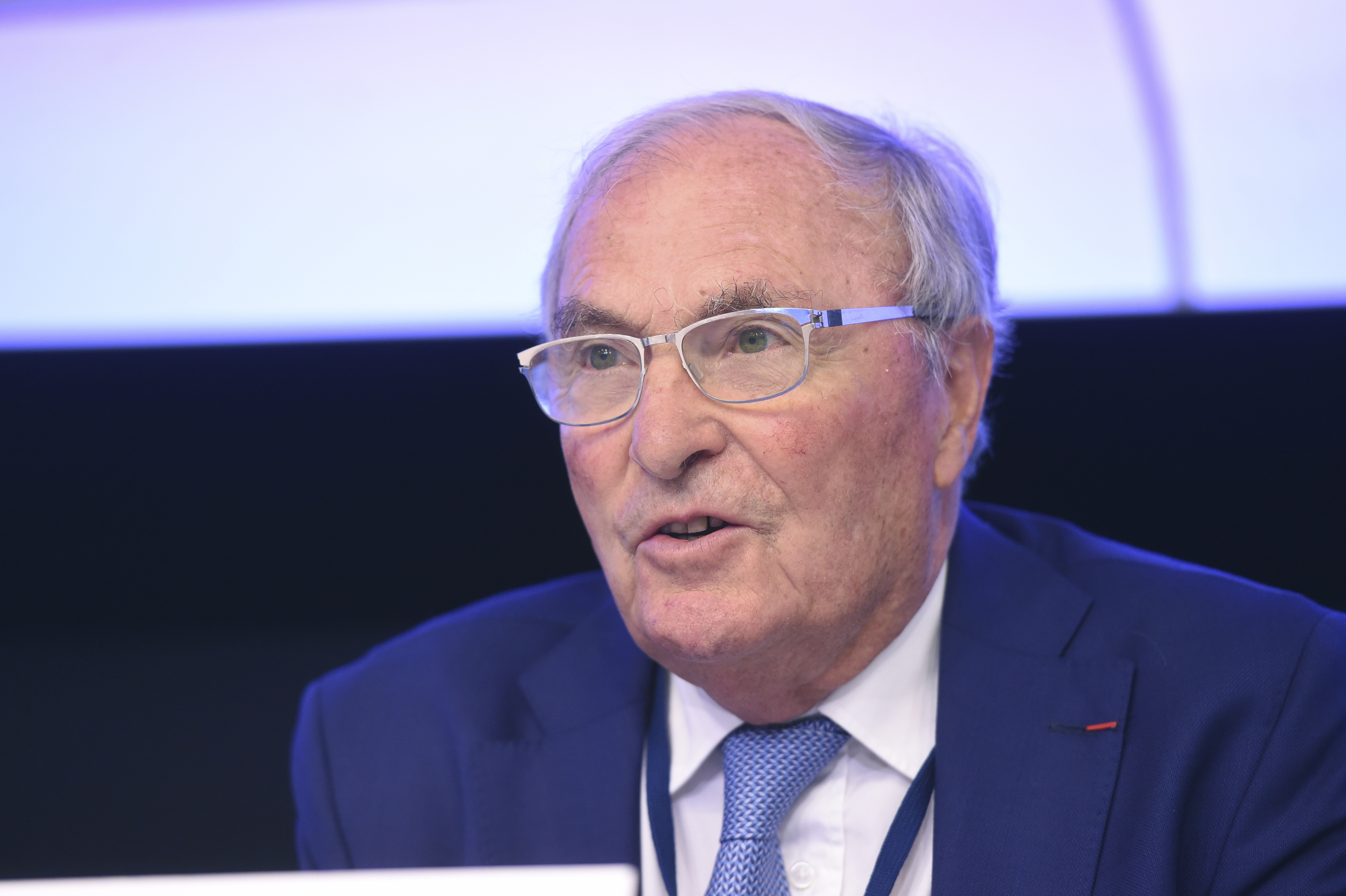
	First party	Second party	Third party
Leader	Georges Frêche	Jacques Blanc	Alain Janet
Party	PS	UMP	FN
Seats won	43	16	8
Popular vote	578,707	374,130	177,074
Percentage	51.22%	33.11%	15.67%

A regional election took place in Languedoc-Roussillon on March 21 and March 28, 2004, along with all other regions. Georges Frêche (PS) was elected President of the former Languedoc-Roussillon Council (now merged to Regional Council of Occitania), defeating incumbent Jacques Blanc.

== Results ==
Party	Presidential candidate	First round		Second round		Seats
Party	Presidential candidate	Votes	%	Votes	%	Seats
Socialist Party	Georges Frêche	387,214	36.32	578,707	51.22	43
Union for a Popular Movement	Jacques Blanc	258,287	24.23	374,130	33.11	16
National Front	Alain Jamet	183,031	17.17	177,074	15.67	8
Union for French Democracy	Marc Dufour	60,822	5.71			0
Hunting, Fishing, Nature and Traditions	Alain Esclope	53,316	5.00			0
CAP21	Georges Fandos	51,089	4.79			0
LCR–LO	David Hermet	50,065	4.70			0
Far-left	Christian Lacour	13,538	1.27			0
National Republican Movement	Elisabeth Pascal	8,627	0.81			0
Total		1,065,989	100.00	1,129,911	100.00	67
Valid votes		1,065,989	95.43	1,129,911	95.59	
Invalid/blank votes		51,052	4.57	52,101	4.41	
Total votes		1,117,041	100.00	1,182,012	100.00	
Registered voters/turnout		1,697,434	65.81	1,698,326	69.60	
Source: Ministry of the Interior, Delwit
