= Abd ar-Rahman ibn Uqba =

Abd ar-Rahman ibn Uqba (Arabic: عبدالرحمن بن عقبة) was the Wali, or governor, of Septimania, an Upper March (administrative division of the Emirate of Córdoba) that substituted Umar ibn Umar in 755. During his governing, Narbonne was lost by conquest to the Franks.
