= Ansemund =

Gothic count of Nîmes (r. 752–754)

Ansemund was the Gothic count of Nîmes, ruling from 752 until his death in 754.

In 752, the Gothic counts of Nîmes, Melguelh, Agde, and Béziers refused allegiance to the Cordoban emir and declared their loyalty to the Frankish Kingdom. Ansemund seems to have had some authority over the other counts. The Gothic counts and the Franks started to besiege Narbonne, but the Moors resisted. In 754, an anti-Frankish reaction led by Ermeniard killed Ansemund, but the rebellion died without success and Radulf was designated as the new count by the Frankish king, Pepin the Short.

== See also ==
- Septimania
- Islamic invasion of Gaul
