= Trausse =

Commune in Occitanie, France

- Commune
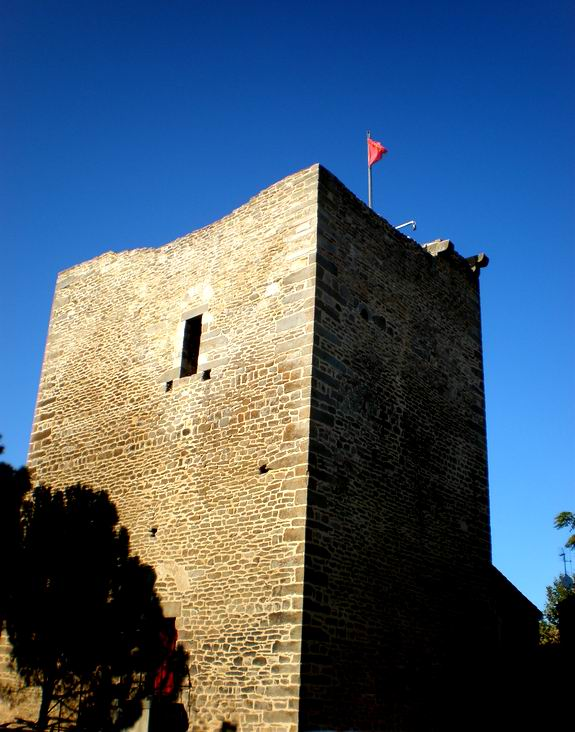
- The tower in Trausse

- Coat of arms
- Location of Trausse
- Location within France Location within Occitanie
- Coordinates: 43°18′46″N 2°33′44″E
- Country: France
- Region: Occitania
- Department: Aude
- Arrondissement: Carcassonne
- Canton: Le Haut-Minervois
- Intercommunality: Carcassonne Agglo

Government
  - Mayor (2020–2026): Jean-François Saïsset
- Area^{1}: 10.70 km^{2} (4.13 sq mi)
- Elevation: 125 m (410 ft)
- Highest elevation: 322 m (1,056 ft)
- Lowest elevation: 127 m (417 ft)
- Population (2023): 614
  - Density: 57.4/km^{2} (149/sq mi)
- Time zone: UTC+01:00 (CET)
  - Summer (DST): UTC+02:00 (CEST)
- INSEE/Postal code: 11396 /11160
- ^{1} French Land Register data, which excludes lakes, ponds, glaciers > 1 km^{2} (0.386 sq mi or 247 acres) and river estuaries.

Trausse is a commune in the Aude department in southern France.

== Population ==
Historical population
Year	Pop.	±% p.a.
1968	493	—
1975	440	−1.61%
1982	433	−0.23%
1990	431	−0.06%
1999	446	+0.38%
2007	503	+1.51%
2012	503	+0.00%
2017	590	+3.24%
2023	614	+0.67%
Source: INSEE

== See also ==
- Communes of the Aude department
