= Umayyad invasion of Gaul =

Attempted invasion of southwest Francia by the Umayyad Caliphate (719–759 AD)

- Part of early Muslim conquests and the Reconquista
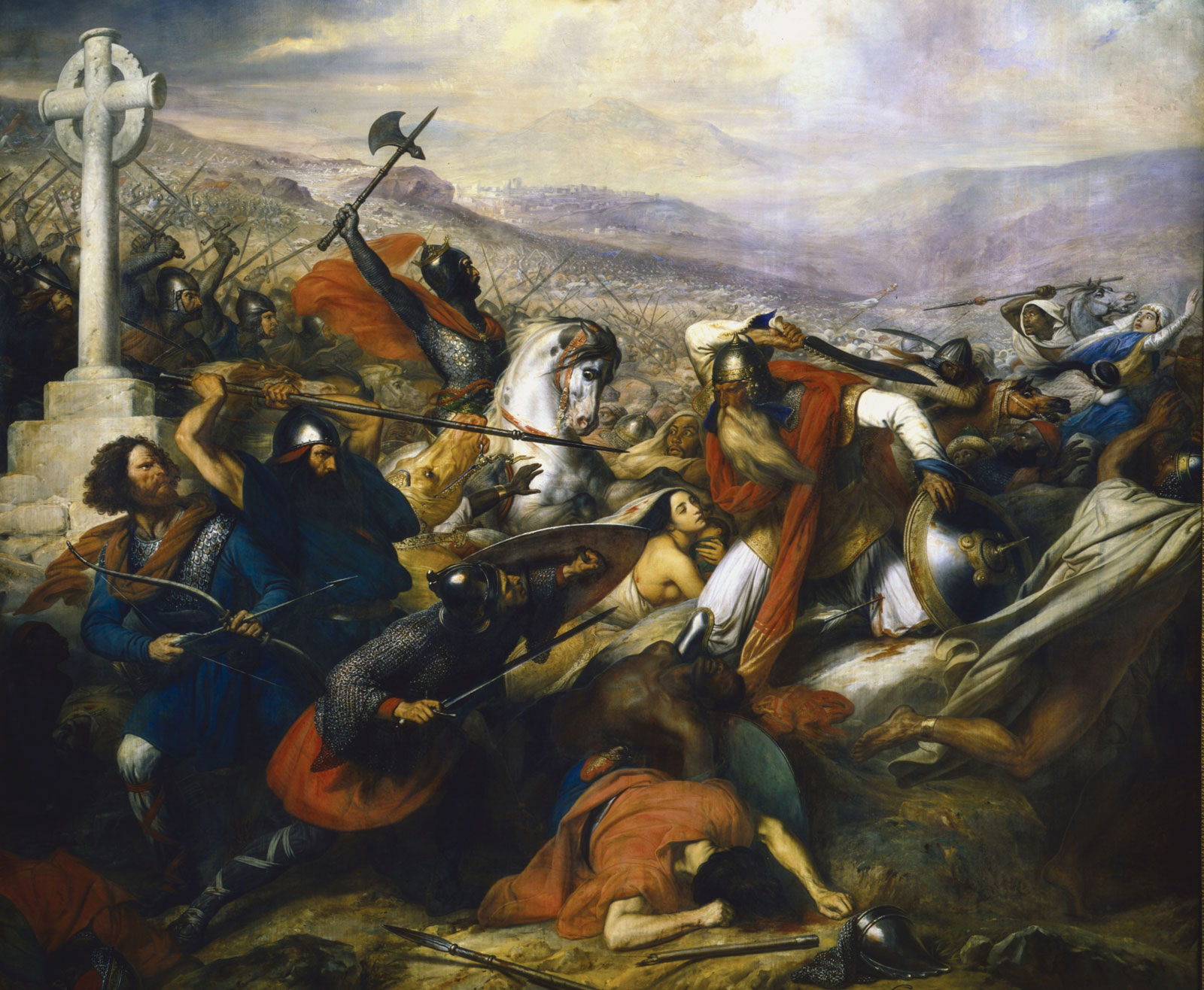
- 1837 painting by Charles de Steuben of the Battle of Tours (732), depicting a triumphant Charles Martel (mounted) facing Abd al-Rahman al-Ghafiqi (right).
Date	AD 719–759
Location	Southern Gaul (now France)
Result	Frankish victory
Territorial changes	Francia conquers Septimania

Belligerents
Umayyad Caliphate; Emirate of Cordoba	Kingdom of the Franks; Duchy of Aquitaine; Duchy of Gascony; Kingdom of the Lombards

Commanders and leaders
Al-Samh ibn Malik al-Khawlani †; Anbasa ibn Suhaym al-Kalbi # Abd al-Rahman al-Ghafiqi †; Uqba ibn al-Hajjaj; Yusuf ibn Abd al-Rahman al-Fihri	Odo the Great; Charles Martel; Pepin the Short; Liutprand; Maurontus

The Umayyads invaded Gaul (modern-day France) following their conquest of the Iberian peninsula (711–718). The invasion occurred in two main phases, from AD 719 and from 732. Although the Umayyads secured control of Septimania, their incursions beyond this region into the southern regions of Gaul failed. In 759, Muslim forces lost Septimania to the Christian Frankish Empire and retreated to the Iberian Peninsula which they called al-Andalus.

The 719 Umayyad invasion of Gaul was the continuation of their conquest of the Visigothic Kingdom of Hispania. Septimania, in southern Gaul, was the last unconquered province of the Visigothic Kingdom. Muslim armies began to campaign in Septimania in 719. After the fall, in 720, of Narbonne, the capital of the Visigothic rump state, Umayyad armies composed of Arabs and Berbers turned north against Aquitaine. Their advance was stopped at the Battle of Toulouse in 721, but they continued to conduct raids in the southern half of Gaul as far as Avignon and Lyon.

A major Umayyad raid directed at Tours, led by Abd al-Rahman al-Ghafiqi, governor of al-Andalus, was defeated in 732 by Charles Martel's forces. From then on, the Franks asserted their authority in Aquitaine and Burgundy, but only in 759 did they manage to retake the Mediterranean region of Septimania, due to Muslim neglect and local Visigothic disaffection.

After the fall of the Umayyad Caliphate and the rise of the Abbasid Caliphate in 750, internal conflicts within al-Andalus, including revolts and the establishment of the Emirate of Córdoba under Abd al-Rahman I, shifted the focus of Andalusi Muslim leaders towards internal consolidation. However, sporadic military expeditions were still launched into Gaul. Some of these raids resulted in temporary Muslim settlements in remote areas, but they were not integrated into the emirate's authority and soon vanished from historical records.

A Muslim incursion into Gaul in the ninth century resulted in the establishment of Fraxinetum, a fortress near Saint-Tropez, Provence that lasted for nearly a century, between about 887 and 972.

== Umayyad conquest of Septimania ==
By 716, under the pressure of the Umayyad Caliphate from the south, the Kingdom of the Visigoths had been rapidly reduced to a rump state in the province of Narbonensis (Septimania), a region which corresponds approximately to the modern Languedoc-Roussillon. In 713 the Visigoths of Septimania elected Ardo as king. He ruled from Narbonne. In 717, the Umayyads under al-Hurr ibn Abd al-Rahman al-Thaqafi crossed the Pyrenees for the first time on a reconnaissance mission. The following campaign of conquest in Septimania lasted three years. Late Muslims sources, such as Ahmad al-Maqqari, describe Musa ibn Nusayr (712–714) as leading an expedition to the Rhône at the far east of the Visigothic kingdom, but these are not reliable.

The next Umayyad governor, al-Samh, crossed the Pyrenees in 719 and conquered Narbonne (Arbuna to the Arabs) in that year or the following (720). According to the Chronicle of Moissac, the inhabitants of the city were slaughtered. The fall of the city ended the seven-year reign of Ardo and with it the Visigothic kingdom, but Visigothic nobles continued to hold the Septimanian cities of Carcassonne and Nîmes. Nevertheless, al-Samh established garrisons in Septimania in 721, intending to incorporate it permanently into the territories of al-Andalus.

However, the Umayyad tide was temporarily halted by the large-scale Battle of Toulouse (721), when al-Samh (Zama in the Christian chronicles) was killed by Odo of Aquitaine. Despite the defeat at Toulouse, the Umayyads still controlled Narbonne and had a strong military presence in Septimania. The Umayyads were far from their core territory in Iberia and needed local support so they offered the local Gothic nobles favorable terms and some autonomy in exchange for tribute and recognition of Umayyad authority. The Visigothic resistance was fragmented and weakened after years of war and the loss of their king. For many Gothic nobles, the agreement was preferable to continued war or subjugation by the Franks or Aquitanians, who were also regional rivals. As a result, many of the Gothic nobles of the Visigothic rump state in Septimania aligned themselves with the Muslims.

In 725, al-Samh's successor, Anbasa ibn Suhaym al-Kalbi, moved against Gothic nobles resisting surrender. The city of Carcassonne was besieged and its Gothic ruler forced to cede half of his territory, pay tribute, and make an offensive and defensive alliance with Muslim forces. The Gothic rulers of Nîmes and the other resisting Septimanian cities also eventually fell under the sway of the Umayyads. In the 720s the savage fighting, the massacres and destruction particularly affecting the Ebro valley and Septimania unleashed a flow of refugees who mainly found shelter in southern Aquitaine across the Pyrenees, and Provence.

Sometime during this period, the Berber commander Uthman ibn Naissa ("Munuza") became governor of the Cerdanya (also including a large swathe of present-day Catalonia). By that time, resentment against Arab rulers was growing within the Berber troops.

== Raid into Aquitaine and Poitou ==
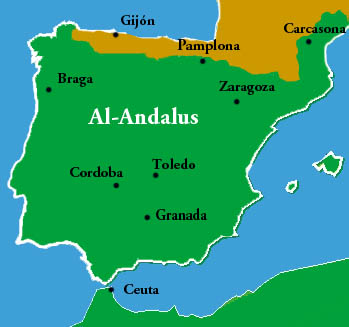
Umayyad Hispania in 732, Septimania is to the northeast, around Carcassonne

=== Uthman ibn Naissa's revolt ===
By 725, all of Septimania was under Umayyad rule. Uthman ibn Naissa, the Pyrenean Berber ruler of the eastern Pyrenees, detached himself from Cordova and established a principality based on a Berber power base in 731. The Berber leader allied with the Aquitanian duke Odo, who was eager to stabilize his borders, and is reported to have married Odo's daughter Lampegia. Uthman ibn Naissa went on to kill Nambaudus, the bishop of Urgell, an official acting on the orders of the Church of Toledo.

The new Umayyad governor in Cordova, Abd al-Rahman al-Ghafiqi, mustered an expedition to punish the Berber commander's insubordination, surrounding and putting him to death in Cerdanya, according to the Mozarabic Chronicle, a just retribution for killing the Gothic bishop.

=== Umayyad expedition over Aquitaine ===
Emboldened by his success, Al-Ghafiqi attacked Uthman ibn Naissa's Aquitanian ally Duke Odo, who had just encountered Charles Martel's devastating offensive on Bourges and northern Aquitaine (731). Still managing to recruit the necessary number of soldiers, the independent Odo confronted al-Ghafiqi's forces that had broken north by the western Pyrenees, but could not hold back the Arab commander's thrust against Bordeaux. The Aquitanian leader was beaten at the Battle of the River Garonne in 732. The Umayyad force then moved north to invade Poitou in order to plunder the Basilica of Saint-Martin-de-Tours.

=== Battle of Tours (732) ===
Odo still found the opportunity to save his grip on Aquitaine by warning the rising Frankish commander Charles Martel of the impending danger against the Frankish sacred city of Tours. Umayyad forces were defeated in the Battle of Tours in 732, considered by many the turning point of Muslim expansion in Gaul. With the death of Odo in 735 and after putting down the Aquitanian detachment attempt led by duke Hunald, Charles Martel went on to deal with Burgundy (734, 736) and the Mediterranean south of Gaul (736, 737).

== Expansion to Provence and Charles Martel ==
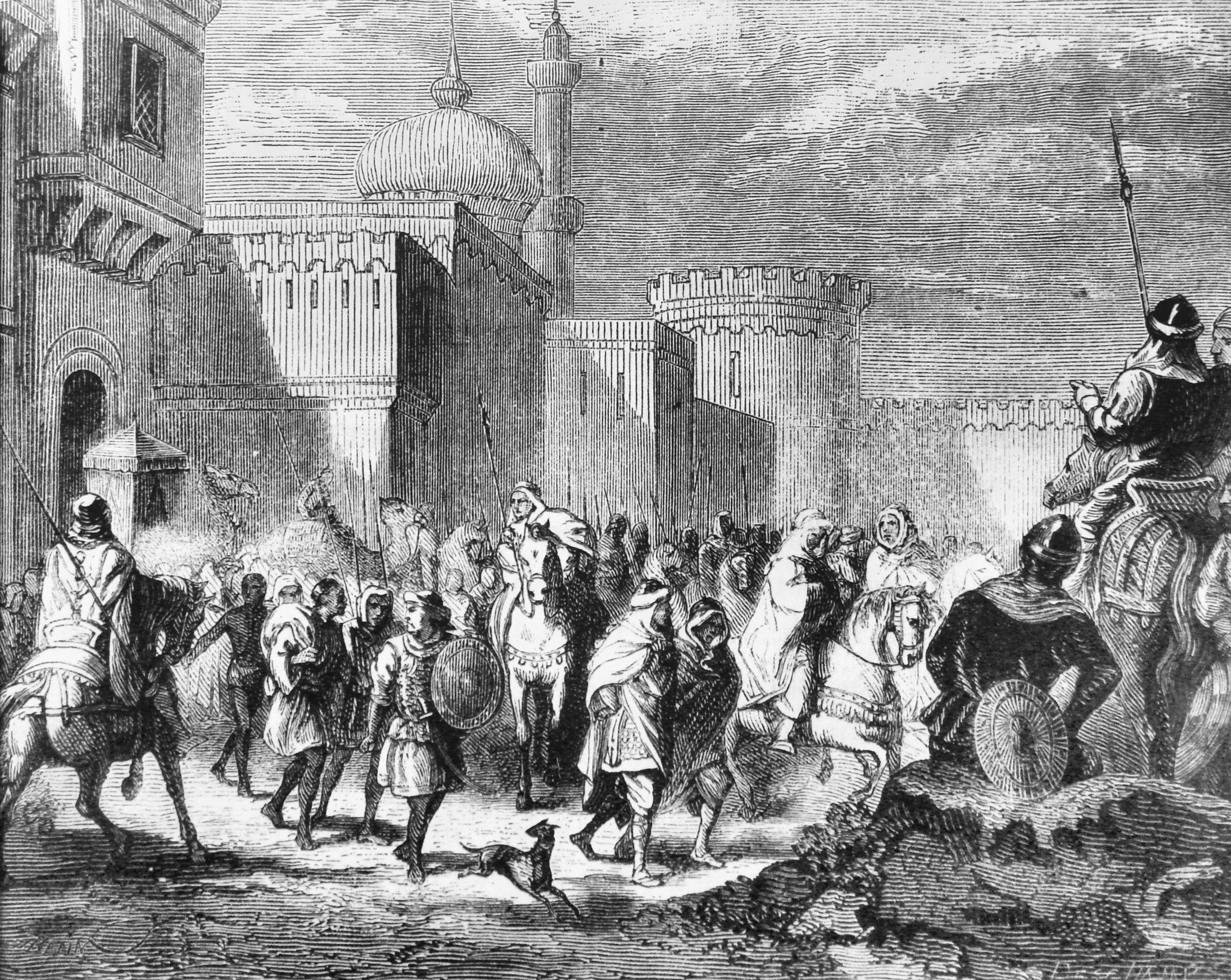
Departure of Umayyad troops from Narbonne to Pépin le Bref, in 759, after 40 years of occupation.

Nevertheless, in 734 Umayyad forces (called "Saracens" by the Europeans at the time) under Abd el-Malik el Fihri, Abd al-Rahman's successor, received without a fight the submission of the cities of Avignon, Arles, and probably Marseille, ruled by count Maurontus. The patrician of Provence had called Andalusi forces in to protect his strongholds from the Carolingian thrust, maybe estimating his own garrisons too weak to fend off Charles Martel's well-organised, strong army made up of vassi enriched with Church lands.

Charles faced the opposition of various regional actors. To begin with the Gothic and Gallo-Roman nobility of the region, who feared his aggressive and overbearing policy. Charles decided to ally with the Lombard King Liutprand in order to repel the Umayyads and the regional nobility of Gothic and Gallo-Roman stock. He also underwent the hostility of the dukes of Aquitaine, who jeopardized Charles' and his successor Pepin's rearguard (737, 752) during their military operations in Septimania and Provence. The dukes of Aquitaine in turn largely relied on the strength of the Basque troops, acting on a strategic alliance with the Aquitanians since mid-7th century.

In 737, Charles captured and reduced Avignon to rubble, in addition to destroying the Umayyad fleet. However, Charles' brother, Childebrand, failed in the siege of Narbonne. Charles attacked several other cities which had collaborated with the Umayyads, and destroyed their fortifications: Beziers, Agde, Maguelone, Montpellier, Nîmes. Before his return to northern Francia, Charles had managed to crush all opposition in Provence and Lower Rhone. Count Maurontus of Marseille fled to the Alps.

== Muslim loss of Septimania ==
Muslims maintained their authority over Septimania for another 15 years, but shifted the focus of their efforts towards the internal divisions within al-Andalus, that had been caused by the collapse of the Umayyad Caliphate in 750. In 752, the newly proclaimed Frankish king Pepin, the son of Charles, launched an invasion of Septimania to take advantage of the internal troubles of the Muslims in al-Andalus and the growing disaffection of the Gothic nobility with their Muslim rulers. That year, Pepin conquered Nimes and went on to subdue most of Septimania up to the gates of Narbonne. In his quest to subdue the region, Charles met the opposition of Waiffer the Duke of Aquitaine. Waifer, aware of Pepin's expansionist ambitions, is recorded as attacking the Frankish rearguard with an army of Basques during the siege of Narbonne.

It was ultimately the Frankish king who managed to take Narbonne in 759, after vowing to respect Gothic law and earning the allegiance of the Gothic nobility, thus marking the end of the Muslim presence in southern Gaul. Furthermore, Pepin directed all his war effort against the Duchy of Aquitaine immediately after subduing Roussillon.

Pepin's son, Charlemagne, fulfilled the Frankish goal of extending the defensive boundaries of the empire beyond Septimania and the Pyrenees, creating a strong buffer zone known as the Spanish March between the Frankish Empire and the Umayyad Emirate. The Spanish March would in the long run become a base, along with the Kingdom of Asturias, for the eventual Christian reconquest of the Iberian Peninsula.

== Controversial Issues ==
- The Destruction Inflicted upon Christian Land: The orientalist Joseph Toussaint Reinaud stated that Muslims caused widespread devastation during their raids, and that monasteries and churches were entirely reduced to ruins after their passage through those regions. He referred to these accounts in his well-known work on the Islamic raids in France, citing several sources upon which he relied on. However, a number of Arab and Muslim historians have argued that the sources cited by Reinaud do not explicitly state that Muslims were responsible for the destruction of all the areas he mentioned; rather, He attributed most of these ruins to them. These historians pointed out that the period during which the Islamic conquests took place in Gaul was marked by general instability and frequent wars among Christian factions themselves, particularly in those regions of Gaul. What further undermines Reinaud's claim, is the fact that Christian kings didn't hesitate to burn villages, churches, and monasteries when fighting one another, and that Clovis himself inflicted extensive destruction and damage upon churches and monasteries in southern Gaul, Burgundy, and Aquitaine, damage that surpassed all description. Also, Muslims had previously conquered lands in which Christians constituted the majority of the population in the Levant, Egypt, Syria, and Iraq, for example, churches were not burned there. On the contrary, the inhabitants were granted covenants of security and peace, ensuring that no one would harm them in their religion or their sacred places.
- The Franks' Stance Toward the Muslims: Reinaud stated that the Muslims did not receive a warm welcome from the inhabitants of the lands they conquered, with the exception of certain individuals who were, in his words, "without religion or homeland". On the other hand, others responded to this statement by saying that many regions of the Franks were, at that time, not adherents of Christianity. Rather, their inhabitants were living a primitive life, had not yet settled on a religion, and did not understand the concept of a homeland. They added that the Franks themselves did not take religion seriously nor feel any sense of national belonging toward Gaul, as that land was still in the process of formation and had not yet become a homeland to which anyone would feel devoted. Some add that the Roman inhabitants of Gaul welcomed the Muslims as saviors from the Franks, as the latter were despised by the Romans, who regarded them as outsiders to the land and usurpers of a power that had once been theirs. They also described Charles Martel as an adventurer and held him and his people in contempt, considering them far removed from the Latin Roman civilization to which the people of Gaul adhered, and of which the Franks understood nothing.

== Legacy ==
Arabic words were borrowed, such as tordjman (translator) which became drogoman in Provençal, and is still in use in the expression "par le truchement de"; charaha (to discuss), which became "charabia". Some place names were also derived from Arabic or in memory of past Muslim inhabitance, such as Ramatuelle and Saint-Pierre de l'Almanarre (from al-manar i.e. 'the lighthouse').

== See also ==
- Islam in France
- Islamic world contributions to Medieval Europe
