= Uthman ibn Abi Nis'a al-Khath'ami =

Uthman ibn Abi Nis'a al-Khath'ami (Arabic: عثمان بن أبي نسعة الخثعمي, romanized: ʿUthmān ibn Abī Nisʿa al-Khathʿamī) (Note: Also spelled ʿUthmān ibn Abī Nasʿa al-Khathʿāmī) was the ninth governor of al-Andalus for the Umayyad Caliphate. He governed for four months from late AD 728 (AH 110) until early 729 (111), succeeding Hudhayfa ibn al-Ahwas al-Qaysi.

The Latin sources, the Mozarabic Chronicle (754) and the Prophetic Chronicle (883), concur in giving him a term of four months. The Andalusian scholar Ibn Habib (878/9), however, gives him five months. Al-Maqqari seems to believe he succeeded Yahya ibn Salama al-Kalbi in December 727 and was in turn succeeded by Hudhayfa in June or July 728, an inversion of the order of governors given in the earlier sources.

The Mozarabic Chronicle does not specify how Uthman came to power and it may be that he was not appointed or approved by either his immediate superior, the governor of Ifriqiya, or the sovereign, the Umayyad caliph in Damascus. According to the Chronicle, which criticises Hudhayfa for his lack of seriousness,

Uthman came secretly from Africa to rule Spain. After [he] had ruled for four months, substituting for [Hudhayfa] with honour, [al-Haytham] openly revealed the seal or authorization of the prince, sent from the aforesaid region [Ifriqiya], indicating that he was to take control of Spain immediately.

Uthman was succeeded by al-Haytham ibn Ubayd al-Kilabi.

== Notes ==
Preceded by Hudhayfa ibn al-Ahwas al-Qaysi	Umayyad governor of al-Andalus; 728–729	Succeeded by al-Haytham ibn Ubayd al-Kilabi
