= Muhammad ibn Abd Allah al-Ashja'i =

Muhammad ibn Abd Allah al-Ashja'i (Arabic: محمد بن عبد الله الأشجعي, romanized: Muḥammad ibn ʿAbd Allāh al-Ashdjaʿī) was the eleventh governor of al-Andalus under the Umayyad Caliphate in AD 730 (AH 111–112). He was one of a series of Arabs from Ifriqiya who served as governors in al-Andalus from 721 to 731.

After ten months in office, Muhammad's predecessor, al-Haytham, was confronted by an attempted coup d'état in early 730. He arrested the conspirators, but their relatives in turn complained about his heavy-handedness to his superior, the governor of Ifriqiya. According to the Chronicle of 754, the earliest source, al-Haytham was arrested and brought to Ifriqiya, but because his intended replacement, al-Qhafiqi, could not be found, Muhammad was appointed to replace him instead. His formal appointment took place, according to the Chronicle, one month after al-Haytham had been removed.

According to the Prophetic Chronicle, written in 883, he only governed for one month. Al-Maqqari, a very late source, puts his term of office in March–May 731, a year later than the earlier chronicles indicate, but right before the generally accepted date for when al-Ghafiqi finally took up office.

== Sources ==
- Christys, Ann (2003). "The Transformation of Hispania after 711". In Hans Werner Goetz; Jörg Jarnut; Walter Pohl (eds.). Regna and Gentes: The Relationship between Late Antique and Early Medieval Peoples and Kingdoms in the Transformation of the Roman World. Leiden: E. J. Brill. pp. 219–241.
- Collins, Roger (1989). The Arab Conquest of Spain, 710–797. London: Basil Blackwell.
- Collins, Roger (1995). Early Medieval Spain: Unity in Diversity, 400–1000. New York: St. Martin's Press.
- Latham, J. D. (1960). "al-Andalus: (vi) General Survey of the History of al-Andalus". In Gibb, H. A. R.; Kramers, J. H.; Lévi-Provençal, E.; Schacht, J.; Lewis, B. & Pellat, Ch. (eds.). The Encyclopaedia of Islam, Second Edition. Volume I: A–B. Leiden: E. J. Brill. pp. 492–497. OCLC 495469456.
- Wolf, Kenneth Baxter, ed. (1999). Conquerors and Chroniclers of Early Medieval Spain (2nd ed.). Liverpool University Press.

Preceded by al-Haytham ibn Ubayd al-Kilabi	Umayyad governor of al-Andalus; 730	Succeeded by Abd al-Rahman ibn Abd Allah al-Ghafiqi
