= Battle of Tours =

732 battle of the Umayyad invasion of Gaul

- Part of the Umayyad invasion of Gaul
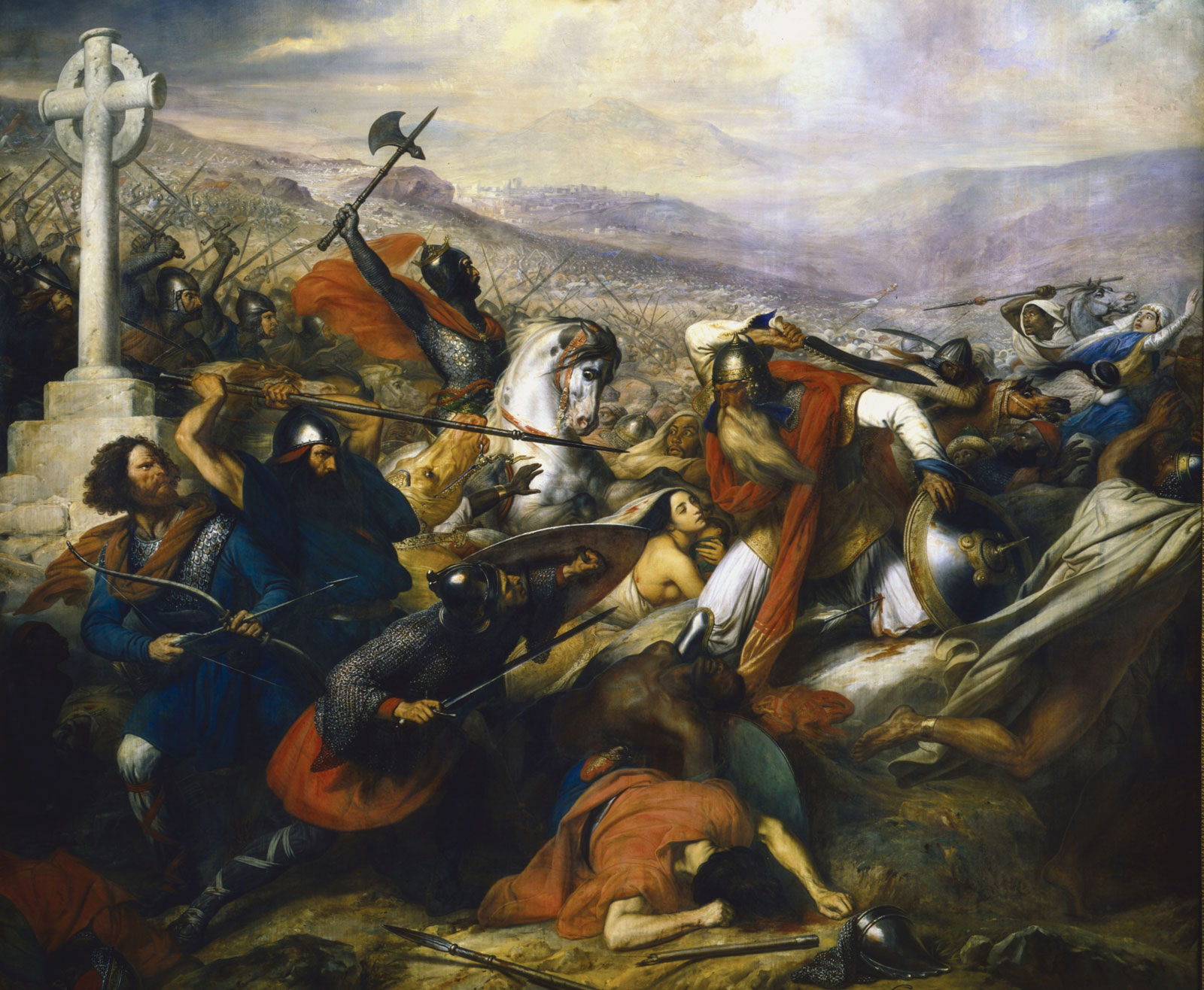
- Battle of Poitiers in October 732; Charles de Steuben, 1837
Date	10 October 732; 1294 years ago
Location	Between Tours and Poitiers, Duchy of Aquitaine (modern-day Moussais-la-Bataille, France) 46°46′52″N 0°32′26″E
Result	Frankish victory
Territorial changes	Withdrawal of Umayyad forces

Belligerents
Kingdom of the Franks; Duchy of Aquitaine; Duchy of Gascony	Umayyad Caliphate

Commanders and leaders
Charles Martel; Odo the Great	Hisham ibn Abd al-Malik; Abd al-Rahman al-Ghafiqi †

Strength
~15,000–30,000	~20,000–30,000

Casualties and losses
Unknown	Abd al-Rahman al-Ghafiqi killed

The Battle of Tours, (Note: Oman 1960, p. 167, gives the traditional date of 10 October 732. White 1962, p. 3, note 3, citing Baudot 1955, goes with October 17, 733. Collins 1989, pp. 90–91, concludes "late (October?) 733" based on the "likely" appointment date of the successor of Abd Al Rahman, who was killed in the battle. Watson 1993, cites problems with Baudot, saying "Baudot's incorrect dating of the battle as 733 A.D. has been employed to this day by those unfamiliar with the sources.") also called the Battle of Poitiers and the Battle of the Highway of the Martyrs (Arabic: معركة بلاط الشهداء, romanized: Maʿrakat Balāṭ ash-Shuhadā'), (Note: Balāṭ, from Latin platea, means pavement, as in a paved court or road.) was fought on 10 October 732, and was an important battle during the Umayyad invasion of Gaul. It resulted in victory for the Frankish and Aquitanian forces, led by Charles Martel, over the invading Umayyad forces, led by Abd al-Rahman al-Ghafiqi, governor of al-Andalus. Many historians, including Edward Gibbon, have credited the Christian victory as an important factor in curtailing the spread of Islam in Western Europe.

Details of the battle, including the number of combatants and its exact location, are unclear from the surviving sources. Most sources agree that the Umayyads had a larger force and suffered heavier casualties. Notably, the Frankish troops apparently fought without heavy cavalry. The battlefield was located somewhere between the cities of Poitiers and Tours, in northern Aquitaine in western France, near the border of the Frankish realm and the then-independent Duchy of Aquitaine under Odo the Great.

Al-Ghafiqi was killed in combat, and the Umayyad army withdrew after the battle. Charles emerged strengthened and Odo weakened. The battle helped lay the foundations of the Carolingian Empire and Frankish domination of western Europe for the next century. Most historians agree that "the establishment of Frankish power in western Europe shaped the continent's destiny and the Battle of Tours confirmed that power."

After the fall of the Umayyad Caliphate and the rise of the Abbasid Caliphate in 750, internal conflicts within al-Andalus, including revolts and the establishment of the Emirate of Córdoba under Abd al-Rahman I, shifted the focus of Andalusi Muslim leaders towards internal consolidation. In the following centuries, chroniclers of the ninth century gave Charles the nickname of Martel (the hammer), but without attributing it to a single battle (Note: La question de l'origine du surnom "Martel" fait l'objet d'une étude approfondie figurant en annexe de l'ouvrage de Blanc et Naudin (p. 269-277).) as he had many victories under his belt.

== Background ==
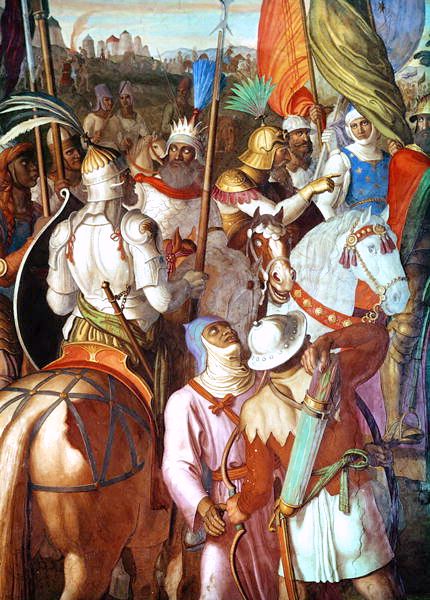
The exoticism of the Saracen army is stressed in this detail from The Saracen Army outside Paris, by Julius Schnorr von Carolsfeld, painted 1822–27, which actually depicts a fictional incident from Ludovico Ariosto (Cassino Massimo, Rome). (Note: The patriotic and religious fresco project and its cultural implications are discussed by Albert Boime, A Social History of Modern Art 2004, pp. 62ff.)

Sources available on ancient battles or those of the High Middle Ages say little on this event. Few Arab authors refer to this episode. Allusions to the battle of Poitiers simply specify that Abd al-Rahman and his companions experienced martyrdom.

The Latin sources of the eighth and ninth centuries are more numerous but remain imprecise. Most chronicles report the event in 732 in brief and similar terms just recalling that Charles fought the Saracens on a Saturday in October. The Annals of Lorsch are more precise. According to Sigebert de Gembloux, "duke Odo, inferior to Charles in all respects, brought against him the Saracens of Spain" (Chronica), where the Chronicles of Fredegar (which he copies) states that "Odo, seeing himself defeated and humiliated by Charles, appealed to the treacherous nation of Saracens."

The Battle of Tours followed two decades of Umayyad conquests in Europe which had begun with the invasion of the Christian Visigothic Kingdom of the Iberian Peninsula in 711. These were followed by military expeditions into the Frankish territories of Gaul, former provinces of the Roman Empire. Umayyad military campaigns reached northward into Aquitaine and Burgundy, including a major engagement at Bordeaux and several raids. Charles's victory is widely believed to have stopped the northward advance of Umayyad forces from the Iberian Peninsula and to have prevented the Islamization of Western Europe.

Most historians assume that the two armies met where the rivers Clain and Vienne join between Tours and Poitiers. The number of troops in each army is not known. The Mozarabic Chronicle of 754, a Latin contemporary source which describes the battle in greater detail than any other Latin or Arabic source, states that "the people of Austrasia [the Frankish forces], greater in number of soldiers and formidably armed, killed the king, Abd ar-Rahman", which agrees with many Arab and Muslim historians. However, virtually all Western sources disagree, estimating the Franks as numbering 30,000, less than half the Muslim force.

Some modern historians, using estimates of what the land was able to support and what Martel could have raised from his realm and supported during the campaign, believe the total Muslim force outnumbered the Franks if one counts the outlying raiding parties which rejoined the main body before Tours. Drawing on non-contemporary Muslim sources, Creasy describes the Umayyad forces as 80,000 strong or more. Writing in 1999, Paul K. Davis estimates the Umayyad forces at 80,000 and the Franks at about 30,000, while noting that modern historians have estimated the strength of the Umayyad army at Tours at between 20,000–80,000. However, Edward J. Schoenfeld, rejecting the older figures of 60,000–400,000 Umayyads and 75,000 Franks, contends that "estimates that the Umayyads had over fifty thousand troops (and the Franks even more) are logistically impossible." Similarly, historian Victor Davis Hanson believes both armies were roughly the same size, between 20,000 and 30,000 men.

Modern historical analysis may be more accurate than the medieval sources, as the modern figures are based on estimates of the logistical ability of the countryside to support these numbers of men and animals. Davis and Hanson point out that both armies had to live off the countryside, neither having a logistical system sufficient to provide supplies for a campaign. Other sources give the following estimates: "Gore places the Frankish army at 15,000–20,000, although other estimates range from 30,000 to 80,000. In spite of wildly varying estimates of the Muslim force, he places that army as around 20,000–25,000. Other estimates also range up to 80,000, with 50,000 not an uncommon estimate."

Losses during the battle are unknown, but chroniclers later claimed that Charles Martel's force lost about 1,500 while the Umayyad force was said to have suffered massive casualties of up to 375,000 men. However, these same casualty figures were recorded in the Liber Pontificalis for Duke Odo the Great's victory at the Battle of Toulouse (721). Paul the Deacon reported correctly in his History of the Lombards (written around 785) that the Liber Pontificalis mentioned these casualty figures in relation to Odo's victory at Toulouse (though he claimed that Charles Martel fought in the battle alongside Odo), but later writers, probably "influenced by the Continuations of Fredegar, attributed the Muslims casualties solely to Charles Martel, and the battle in which they fell became unequivocally that of Tours-Poitiers." The Vita Pardulfi, written in the middle of the eighth century, reports that after the battle 'Abd-al-Raḥmân's forces burned and looted their way through the Limousin region on their way back to Al-Andalus, which implies that they were not destroyed to the extent imagined in the Continuations of Fredegar.

=== Umayyads ===
The invasion of Hispania, and then Gaul, was conducted by the Umayyad dynasty (Arabic: بنو أمية banū umayya / الأمويون al-umawiyyūn also "Umawi"), the first dynasty of Sunni caliphs of the Sunni Islamic empire after the reign of the Rashidun Caliphs (Abu Bakr, Umar, Uthman, and Ali) ended. The Umayyad Caliphate, at the time of the Battle of Tours, was perhaps the world's foremost military power. The great expansion of the Caliphate occurred under the reign of the Umayyads. Muslim armies pushed east across Persia and west across North Africa through the late 7th century.

The Umayyad empire was now a vast domain that ruled a diverse array of peoples. It had defeated and completely absorbed the Sasanian Empire, while also conquering much of the Byzantine Empire, including Syria, Armenia, and North Africa, although Leo the Isaurian stemmed the tide when his army defeated the Umayyads at the Battle of Akroinon (740), their final campaign in Anatolia.

=== Franks ===
The Frankish realm under Charles Martel was the foremost military power of western Europe. During most of his tenure in office as commander-in-chief of the Franks, the Frankish kingdom consisted of north and eastern France, most of western Germany, and the Low Countries (modern-day Luxembourg, Belgium and the Netherlands), all divided into Austrasia, Neustria and Burgundy. This domain had begun to progress towards becoming the first real imperial power in western Europe since the fall of Rome. However, it continued to struggle against external forces such as the Saxons, Frisians, and other opponents such as the Basque-Aquitanians led by Odo the Great (Old French: Eudes, or Eudo), Duke of Aquitaine and Vasconia.

=== Umayyad conquests from Hispania ===
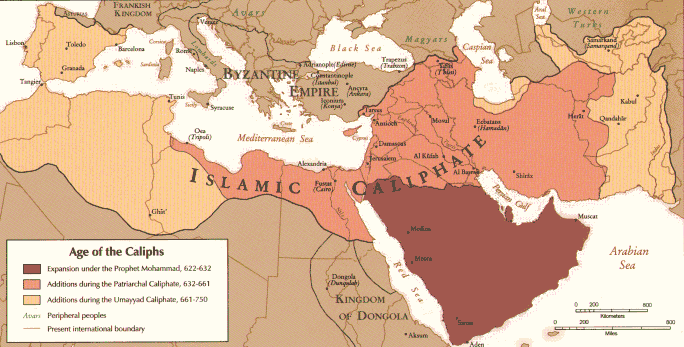
The "Age of the Caliphs", showing Umayyad dominance stretching from the Middle East to the Iberian Peninsula, including the port of Narbonne, c. 720

Modern-day French borders. Septimania runs along the Mediterranean (southeast) coast from the Spanish border, and Aquitaine is along the Atlantic (west) coast running north from Spain.

The Umayyad troops, under Al-Samh ibn Malik al-Khawlani, the governor-general of al-Andalus, overran Septimania by 719, following their sweep up the Iberian Peninsula. Al-Samh set up his capital from 720 at Narbonne, which the Moors called Arbūna. With the port of Narbonne secure, the Umayyads swiftly subdued without much resistance the cities of Alet, Béziers, Agde, Lodève, Maguelonne, and Nîmes, still controlled by their Visigothic counts.

The Umayyad campaign into Aquitaine suffered a temporary setback at the Battle of Toulouse. Duke Odo the Great broke the siege of Toulouse, taking Al-Samh ibn Malik's forces by surprise. Al-Samh ibn Malik was mortally wounded. This defeat did not stop incursions into old Roman Gaul, as Moorish forces, soundly based in Narbonne and easily resupplied by sea, struck eastwards in the 720s, penetrating and raiding into Burgundy in 725.

Threatened by both the Umayyads in the south and by the Franks in the north, in 730 Odo allied himself with the Berber commander Uthman ibn Naissa, called "Munuza" by the Franks, the deputy governor of what would later become Catalonia. To seal the alliance, Uthman was given Odo's daughter Lampagie in marriage, and the Moors ceased their raids across the Pyrenees, Odo's southern border. However, the next year, the Berber leader killed the bishop of Urgell Nambaudus and detached himself from his Arab masters in Cordova. Abd Al Raḥman in turn sent an expedition to crush his revolt, and next directed his attention against Uthman's ally Odo.

Odo collected his army at Bordeaux, but was defeated, and Bordeaux was plundered. During the following Battle of the River Garonne, the Chronicle of 754 (Note: Previously attributed to Isidorus Pacensis, Bishop of Beja – see, O'Callaghan, 1983, p. 189.) commented that "God alone knows the number of the slain". (Note: Latin: "Solus Deus numerum morientium vel pereuntium recognoscat") The chronicle added that they "pierced through the mountains, trampled over rough and level ground, plundered far into the country of the Franks, and smote all with the sword, insomuch that when Eudo came to battle with them at the River Garonne, he fled."

=== Odo's appeal to the Franks ===
Odo set about reorganizing his troops despite his heavy losses, and gave the Frankish leader notice of the impending danger to the heartland of his realm while appealing to the Franks for assistance, which Charles Martel only granted after Odo agreed to submit to Frankish authority.

It appears that the Umayyads were not aware of the true strength of the Franks. The Umayyad forces were not particularly concerned about any of the Germanic tribes, including the Franks, and the Arab chronicles of that age show that awareness of the Franks as a growing military power only came after the Battle of Tours.

Further, the Umayyads appear not to have scouted northward for potential foes, for if they had, they surely would have noted Charles Martel as a force to be reckoned with on his own, because of his growing domination of much of Europe since 717.

=== Umayyad advance towards the Loire ===
In 732, the Umayyad advance force was proceeding north towards the Loire River, having outpaced their supply wagons and a large part of their army. Having easily destroyed all resistance in that part of Gaul, the invading army had split off into several raiding parties, while the main body advanced more slowly.

The Umayyads delayed their campaign late in the year probably because the army needed to live off the land as they advanced. They had to wait until the area's wheat harvest was ready and then until a reasonable amount of the harvest had been stored.

Odo was defeated so easily at Bordeaux and Garonne, despite winning eleven years earlier at the Battle of Toulouse, because at Toulouse he had managed a surprise attack against an overconfident and unprepared foe: the Umayyad forces were mostly infantry, and what cavalry they did have were never mobilized. As Herman of Carinthia wrote in one of his translations of a history of al-Andalus, Odo managed a highly successful encircling envelopment which took the attackers completely by surprise, resulting in the slaughter of the Muslim forces.

At Bordeaux and again at Garonne, the Umayyad forces were mostly cavalry and had the chance to mobilize, which led to the devastation of Odo's army. Odo's forces, like other European troops of that era, had no stirrups at that time and therefore no heavy cavalry. Most of their troops were infantry. The Umayyad heavy cavalry broke Odo's infantry in their first charge and then slaughtered them as they fled.

The invading force went on to devastate southern Gaul. A possible motive, according to the second continuator of the Chronicle of Fredegar, were the riches of the Abbey of Saint Martin of Tours, the most prestigious and holiest shrine in western Europe at the time. Upon hearing this, Austrasia's Mayor of the Palace, Charles Martel, prepared his army and marched south, avoiding the old Roman roads, hoping to take the Muslims by surprise. His Austrasian army consisted almost entirely of Rhineland Franks (or German Franks), and large auxiliary forces from east of the Rhine including Thuringians, Alemannis (also called Swabians), and Bavarians recruited from across Germany, although he also sent out word for the Neustrian Franks and Burgundians to join him. Many Burgundian nobles decided not to participate. Frisians were also mustered into Martel’s army.

== Battle (October 732) ==
The location of the battle in modern-day France

=== Preparations and maneuver ===
By all accounts, the invading forces were caught off guard to discover a large force sitting directly in their path to Tours. Charles achieved the total surprise he had hoped for. He then chose not to attack but rather set up a defensive, phalanx-like formation. According to Arab sources, the Franks drew up in a large square, with hills and trees in their front to impede or break up Muslim cavalry charges.

For one week, the two armies engaged in minor skirmishes while the Umayyads waited for their full strength to arrive. 'Abd-al-Raḥmân, despite being a proven commander, had been outmaneuvered by allowing Charles to concentrate his forces and pick the field of battle. Furthermore, the Umayyads could not judge the size of Charles' army since he had used the forest to conceal his true numbers.

Charles' infantry was his best hope for victory. Seasoned and battle-hardened, most of them had fought under him for years, some as far back as 717. In addition to his army, he also had levies of militia which had not seen significant military use except for gathering food and harassing the Muslim army.

While many historians through the centuries have believed that the Franks were outnumbered at the onset of battle by at least two to one, some sources, such as the Mozarabic Chronicle of 754, contradict that assertion.

Charles correctly assumed that 'Abd-al-Raḥmân would feel compelled to give battle, and move on and try to loot Tours. Neither side wanted to attack. Abd-al-Raḥmân felt he had to sack Tours, which meant he had to go through the Frankish army on the hill in front of him. Charles' decision to stay in the hills proved crucial, as it forced the Umayyad cavalry to charge uphill and through trees, diminishing their effectiveness.

Charles had been preparing for this confrontation since the Battle of Toulouse a decade earlier. Gibbon believes, as do most historians, that Charles had made the best of a bad situation. Though allegedly outnumbered and without any heavy cavalry, he had tough, battle-hardened infantrymen who believed in him implicitly. At a time in the Middle Ages when permanent armies had been non-existent in Europe, Charles even took out a large loan from the Pope after convincing him of the impending emergency, to properly train and maintain a full-size army largely composed of professional infantry. Moreover, as Davis points out, these infantrymen were heavily armed.

Formed into a phalanx formation, they were able to withstand a cavalry charge better than might be expected, especially as Charles had secured the high ground – with trees before him to further impede any cavalry charges. Arab intelligence failed to discern the reliability and strength of Charles's men (whom he had trained for a decade), but Charles was well aware of the Caliphate's strengths and weaknesses.

Furthermore, the Franks were dressed for the cold, whereas the Arabs wore very light clothing more suitable for North African winters than European winters.

The battle eventually became a waiting game in which the Muslims did not want to attack an army that could be numerically superior and wanted the Franks to come out into the open. The Franks formed up in a thick defensive formation and waited for them to charge uphill. The battle finally began on the seventh day, as 'Abd-al-Raḥmân did not want to wait any longer, with winter approaching.

=== Engagement ===
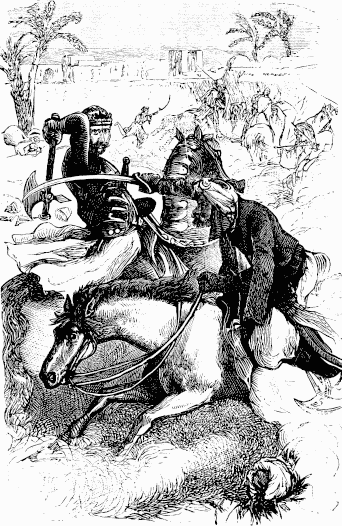
Frankish and Umayyad cavalry clash (illustration from the 19th century by Charlotte Mary Yonge)

'Abd-al-Raḥmân trusted in the tactical superiority of his cavalry and had them charge repeatedly throughout the day. The disciplined Frankish soldiers withstood the assaults, though according to Arab sources, the Arab cavalry broke into the Frankish square several times. Despite this, the Franks did not break. The well-trained Frankish soldiers accomplished what has been considered being impossible at that time: infantry withstanding a heavy cavalry charge. Paul Davis says the core of Charles' army was a professional infantry that was both highly disciplined and well-motivated, "having campaigned with him all over Europe".

=== Contemporary accounts ===
The Mozarabic Chronicle of 754 "describes the battle in greater detail than any other Latin or Arabic source". It says of the encounter that,

While Abd ar-Rahman was pursuing Odo, he decided to despoil Tours by destroying its palaces and burning its churches. There he confronted the consul of Austrasia by the name of Charles, a man who, having proved himself to be a warrior from his youth and an expert in things military, had been summoned by Odo. After each side had tormented the other with raids for almost seven days, they finally prepared their battle lines and fought fiercely. The northern peoples remained as immobile as a wall, holding together like a glacier in the cold regions. In the blink of an eye, they annihilated the Arabs with the sword. The people of Austrasia, greater in a number of soldiers and formidably armed, killed the king, Abd ar-Rahman, when they found him, striking him on the chest. But suddenly, within sight of the countless tents of the Arabs, the Franks despicably sheathed their swords postponing the fight until the next day since night had fallen during the battle. Rising from their own camp at dawn, the Europeans saw the tents and canopies of the Arabs all arranged just as they had appeared the day before. Not knowing that they were empty and thinking that inside them there were Saracen forces ready for battle, they sent officers to reconnoiter and discovered that all the Ishmaelite troops had left. They had indeed fled silently by night in tight formation, returning to their own country.

— Chronicle of 754

Charles Martel's family composed, for the fourth book of the Continuations of Fredegar's Chronicle, a stylized summary of the battle:

Prince Charles boldly drew up his battle lines against them [the Arabs] and the warrior rushed in against them. With Christ's help, he overturned their tents and hastened to battle to grind them small in slaughter. The king Abdirama having been killed, he destroyed [them], driving forth the army, he fought and won. Thus did the victor triumph over his enemies.

— Chronicle of Fredegar

This source details further that "he (Charles Martel) came down upon them like a great man of battle". It goes on to say Charles "scattered them like the stubble".

The Latin word used for "warrior", belligerator, "is from the Book of Maccabees, chapters 15 and 16", which describe huge battles.

It is thought that Bede's Ecclesiastical History of the English People (Book V, Chapter XXIV) includes a reference to the Battle of Tours: "... a dreadful plague of Saracens ravaged France with miserable slaughter, but they not long after in that country received the punishment due to their wickedness".

=== Strategic analysis ===
Gibbon makes the point that 'Abd-al-Raḥmân did not move at once against Charles Martel, and was surprised by him at Tours as Charles had marched over the mountains while avoiding the roads to surprise the Muslim invaders. Thus, Charles selected the time and place they would fight.

'Abd-al-Raḥmân was a good general, but failed to do two things he should have done before the battle:

- He either assumed that the Franks would not come to the aid of their Aquitanian rivals, or was indifferent, and he thus failed to assess their strength before the invasion.
- He failed to scout the movements of the Frankish army.

These failures disadvantaged the Muslim army in the following ways:

- The invaders were burdened with riches that they stole that played a role in the battle.
- They had casualties before they fought the battle.
- Weaker opponents such as Odo were not bypassed, whom they could have picked off at will later, while moving at once to force battle with the real power in Europe and at least partially pick the battlefield.

While some military historians point out that leaving enemies in your rear is not generally wise, the Mongols proved that indirect attack, and bypassing weaker foes to eliminate the strongest first, can be a devastatingly effective mode of invasion. In this case, those enemies were virtually no danger, given the ease with which the Muslims destroyed them. The real danger was Charles, and the failure to scout Gaul adequately was disastrous.

According to Creasy, both western and Muslim histories agree the battle was hard fought, and that the Umayyad heavy cavalry had broken into the square, but agreed that the Franks were in formation still strongly resisting.

Charles could not afford to stand idly by while Frankish territories were threatened. He would have to face the Umayyad armies sooner or later, and his men were enraged by the utter devastation of the Aquitanians and wanted to fight. But Sir Edward Creasy noted that,

When we remember that Charles had no standing army, and the independent spirit of the Frank warriors who followed his standard, it seems most probable that it was not in his power to adopt the cautious policy of watching the invaders, and wearing out their strength by delay. So dreadful and so widespread were the ravages of the Saracenic light cavalry throughout Gaul, that it must have been impossible to restrain for any length of time the indignant ardor of the Franks. And, even if Charles could have persuaded his men to look tamely on while the Arabs stormed more towns and desolated more districts, he could not have kept an army together when the usual period of a military expedition had expired.

Both Hallam and Watson argue that had Charles failed, there was no remaining force to protect Western Europe. Hallam perhaps said it best: "It may justly be reckoned among those few battles of which a contrary event would have essentially varied the drama of the world in all its subsequent scenes: with Marathon, Arbela, the Metaurus, Châlons and Leipzig." (Note: quoted in Creasy & Speed 2001, p. viii)

Strategically, and tactically, Charles probably made the best decision he could in waiting until his enemies least expected him to intervene, and then marching by stealth to catch them by surprise at a battlefield of his choosing. Probably he and his own men did not realize the seriousness of the battle they had fought, as one historian put it: "few battles are remembered over 1,000 years after they are fought, but the Battle of [Tours-Poitiers] is an exception ... Charles Martel turned back a Muslim raid that had it been allowed to continue, might have conquered Gaul."

== Victory for Charles Martel ==
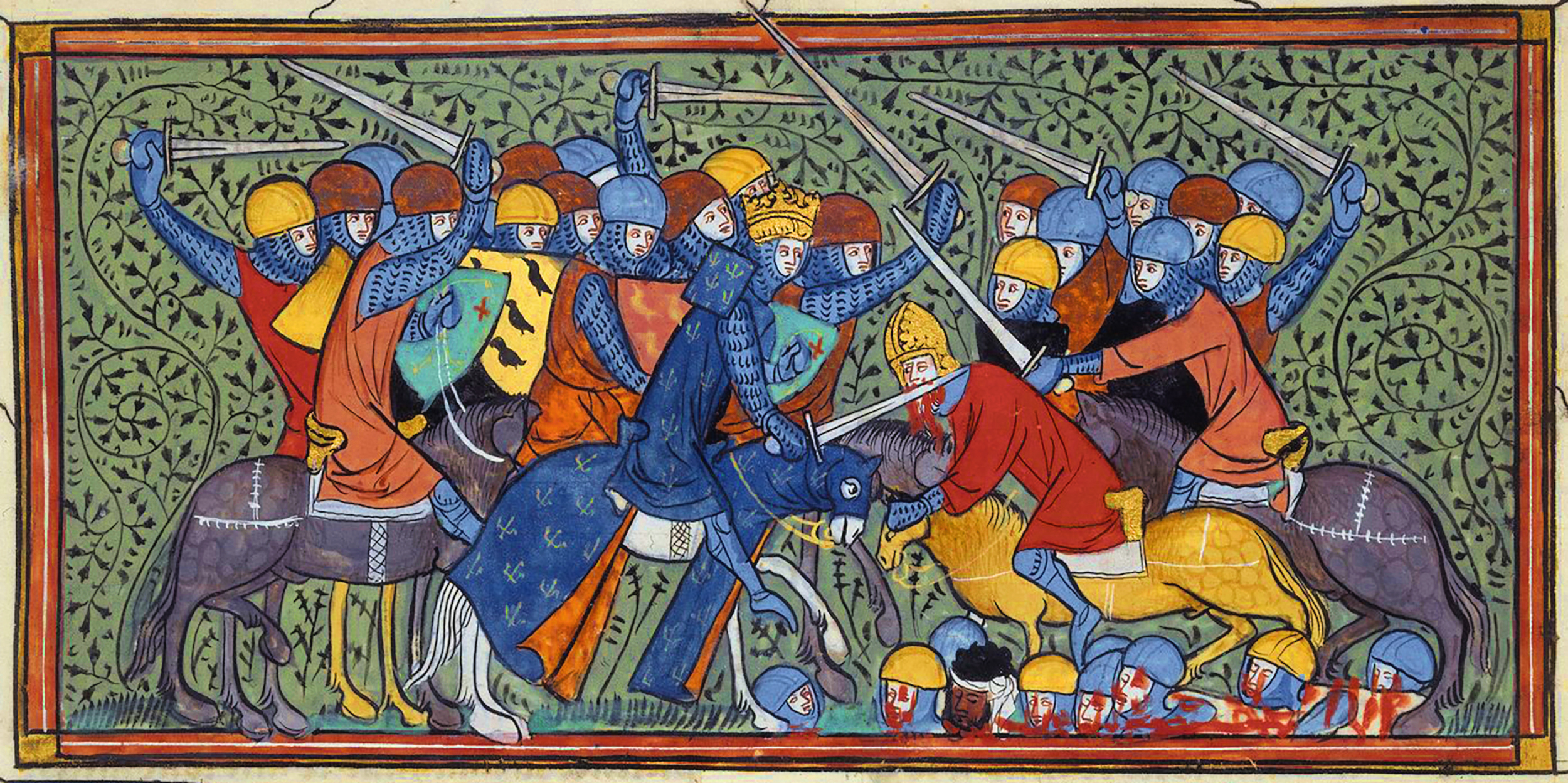
Charles Martel at the Battle of Tours, depicted in the Grandes Chroniques de France

=== Umayyad retreat and second invasion ===
The Umayyad army retreated south over the Pyrenees. Charles continued to expand south in subsequent years. After the death of Odo (c. 735), who had reluctantly acknowledged Charles' suzerainty in 719, Charles wished to unite Odo's duchy to himself and went there to elicit the proper homage of the Aquitanians. But the nobility proclaimed Hunald, Odo's son, as the duke, and Charles recognized his legitimacy when the Umayyads entered Provence as part of an alliance with Duke Maurontus the next year.

Hunald, who originally resisted acknowledging Charles as an overlord, soon had little choice. He acknowledged Charles as his overlord, albeit not for long, and Charles confirmed his duchy.

==== Umayyad invasion (735–39) ====
In 735, Uqba ibn al-Hajjaj, the new governor of al-Andalus, invaded Gaul. Antonio Santosuosso and other historians detail how he advanced into France to avenge the defeat at Tours and to spread Islam. According to Santosuosso, Uqba ibn al-Hajjaj converted about 2,000 Christians he had captured over his career. In the last major attempt at an invasion of Gaul through Iberia, a sizable expedition was assembled at Saragossa and entered what is now French territory in 735, crossed the River Rhone, and captured and looted Arles. From there, he struck into the heart of Provence, ending with the capture of Avignon, despite strong resistance.

Uqba ibn al-Hajjaj's forces remained in Septimania and part of Provence for four years, carrying raids to Lyons, Burgundy, and Piedmont. Charles Martel invaded Septimania in two campaigns in 736 and 739, but was forced back again to Frankish territory under his control. Alessandro Santosuosso strongly argues that the second (Umayyad) expedition was probably more dangerous than the first. The second expedition's failure put an end to any serious Muslim expedition across the Pyrenees, although raids continued. Plans for further large-scale attempts were hindered by internal turmoil in the Umayyad lands which often made enemies out of their own kind.

=== Advance to Narbonne ===
Despite the defeat at Tours, the Umayyads remained in control of parts of Septimania for another 27 years, though they could not expand further. The treaties reached earlier with the local population stood firm and were further consolidated in 734 when the governor of Narbonne, Yusuf ibn Abd al-Rahman al-Fihri, concluded agreements with several towns on common defense arrangements against the encroachments of Charles Martel, who had systematically brought the south to heel as he extended his domains. He conquered Umayyad fortresses and destroyed their garrisons at the Siege of Avignon and the Siege of Nîmes.

The army attempting to relieve Narbonne met Charles in open battle at the Battle of the River Berre and was destroyed. However, Charles failed in his attempt to take Narbonne at the Siege of Narbonne in 737, when the city was jointly defended by its Muslim Arab and Berber, and its Christian Visigothic citizens.

=== Carolingian dynasty ===
Reluctant to tie down his army for a siege that could last years, and believing he could not afford the losses of an all-out frontal assault such as he had used at Arles, Charles was content to isolate the few remaining invaders in Narbonne and Septimania. The threat of invasion was diminished after the Umayyad defeat at Narbonne, and the unified Caliphate would collapse into civil war in 750 at the Battle of the Zab.

It was left to Charles' son, Pepin the Short, to force Narbonne's surrender in 759, thus bringing it into the Frankish domains. The Umayyad dynasty was expelled, driven back to Al-Andalus where Abd al-Rahman I established an emirate in Córdoba in opposition to the Abbasid caliph in Baghdad.

In the northeast of Spain, the Frankish emperors established the Marca Hispanica across the Pyrenees in part of what today is Catalonia, reconquering Girona in 785 and Barcelona in 801. This formed a buffer zone against Muslim lands across the Pyrenees. Historian J.M. Roberts said in 1993 of the Carolingian dynasty:

It produced Charles Martel, the soldier who turned the Arabs back at Tours, and the supporter of Saint Boniface the Evangelizer of Germany. This is a considerable double mark to have left on the history of Europe.

Before the Battle of Tours, stirrups may have been unknown in the west. Lynn Townsend White Jr. argues that the adoption of the stirrup for cavalry was the direct cause of the development of feudalism in the Frankish realm by Charles Martel and his heirs. (Note: However White denied the importance of Tours in Charles Martel's reforms, both because they began the year before the battle (White accepted 733 as the battle year) and because Claudio Sanchez-Albornoz "has shown that even twenty years after Martel's death the Spanish Muslims used cavalry only in small numbers.")

== Historical and macrohistorical views ==
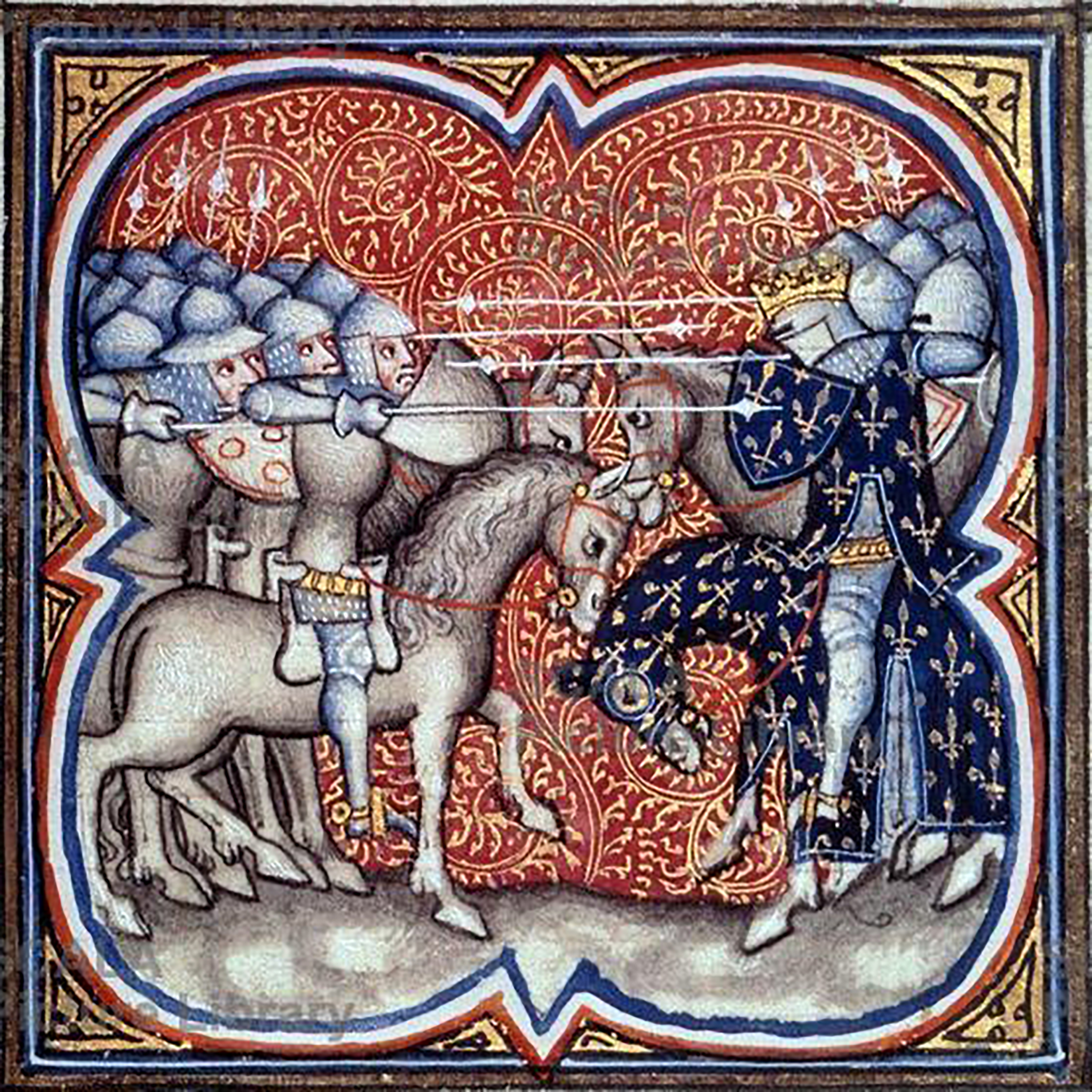
The Battle of Tours depicted in the Grandes Chroniques de France

The historical views of this battle fall into three great phases, both in the East and especially in the West. Western historians, beginning with the Mozarabic Chronicle of 754, stressed the macrohistorical impact of the battle, as did the Continuations of Fredegar. This became a claim that Charles had saved Christianity, as Gibbon and his generation of historians agreed that the Battle of Tours was unquestionably decisive in world history.

Modern historians have essentially fallen into two camps on the issue. The first camp essentially agrees with Gibbon, and the other argues that the battle has been massively overstated – turned from a raid in force to an invasion, and from a mere annoyance to the Caliph to a shattering defeat that helped end the Islamic Expansion Era. It is essential, however, to note that within the first group, those who agree the battle was of macrohistorical importance, there are a number of historians who take a more moderate and nuanced view of the significance of the battle, in contrast to the more dramatic and rhetorical approach of Gibbon. The best example of this school is William E. Watson, who does believe the battle has such importance, as will be discussed below, but analyzes it militarily, culturally, and politically, rather than seeing it as a classic "Muslim versus Christian" confrontation.

In the East, Arab histories followed a similar path. First, the battle was regarded as a disastrous defeat; then, it largely faded from Arab histories, leading to a modern dispute which regards it as either a second loss to the great defeat of the Second Siege of Constantinople, where the Bulgarian Emperor Tervel played a crucial role, or a part of a series of great macrohistorical defeats which together brought about the fall of the first Caliphate. With the Byzantines and Bulgarians together with the Franks both successfully blocking further expansion, internal social troubles came to a head, starting with the Great Berber Revolt of 740, and ending with the Battle of the Zab, and the destruction of the Umayyad Caliphate.

=== In Western history ===
The first wave of modern historians, especially scholars on Rome and the medieval period, such as Edward Gibbon, contended that had Charles fallen, the Umayyad Caliphate would have easily conquered a divided Europe. Gibbon famously observed:

A victorious line of march had been prolonged above a thousand miles from the rock of Gibraltar to the banks of the Loire; the repetition of an equal space would have carried the Saracens to the confines of Poland and the Highlands of Scotland; the Rhine is not more impassable than the Nile or Euphrates, and the Arabian fleet might have sailed without a naval combat into the mouth of the Thames. Perhaps the interpretation of the Koran would now be taught in the schools of Oxford, and her pulpits might demonstrate to a circumcised people the sanctity and truth of the revelation of Mahomet.

Gibbon credited the victory to the superiority of the Franks in close combat: “During the first six days of desultory combat, the horsemen and archers of the East maintained their advantage; but in the closer onset of the seventh day, the Orientals were oppressed by the strength and stature of the Germans”

Nor was Gibbon alone in lavishing praise on Charles as the savior of Christendom and western civilization. H. G. Wells wrote: "The Moslim [sic] when they crossed the Pyrenees in 720 found this Frankish kingdom under the practical rule of Charles Martel, the Mayor of the Palace of a degenerate descendant of Clovis, and experienced the decisive defeat of [Tours-Poitiers] (732) at his hands. This Charles Martel was practically overlord of Europe north of the Alps from the Pyrenees to Hungary. He ruled over a multitude of subordinate lords speaking French-Latin and High and Low German languages."

Gibbon was echoed a century later by the Belgian historian Godefroid Kurth, who wrote that the Battle of Tours "must ever remain one of the great events in the history of the world, as upon its issue depended whether Christian Civilization should continue or Islam prevail throughout Europe."

Writing in 1874, Mary Elsie Thalheimer wrote of its significance as a battle:

It was their purpose, after conquering France and Germany, to follow the Danube to its mouth, overturn the Greek empire, and thus surround the Mediterranean Sea with one great Moslem dominion. To this end troops were collected from Syria, Egypt, and the Barbary states, as well as from Spain; while Charles Martel, son and successor of Pepin d'Heristal as Mayor of the Austrasian Franks, drew to his standard all the Teutonic tribes from the forests of Germany and the marshes of the North Sea.

Near the center of France, between Tours and Poitiers, the two hosts of Europe and Asia, Germans and Arabs, stood seven days confronting each other, only partial skirmishes foretokening the great battle which was to decide whether modern Europe should be Mohammedan or Christian. At length the Saracen horsemen spurred against the German spears, which stood "like a wall of iron, a rampart of ice," to receive them. The combat lasted all day, and was renewed the next morning with unremitting fury; but at length the Arabs gave way; Abderrahman was slain; the other generals quarreled among themselves, and each sought his own safety by a separate and silent flight.

Their deserted camp was found filled with the wealth of the East and the spoils of France. Charles with his Germans had gained one of the most complete and decisive battles in the world's history.

Though retaining for twenty years their foothold in Septimania, the Saracens made no more serious attempts at conquest north of the Pyrenees.

D. H. Lawrence wrote of the battle in a section of a Oxford School textbook:

Behind Charles Martel stood the ranks of tall, blond Franks, Germans, armed with their huge battle-axes. The dark sons of Arabia and Africa faced the young power of Europe. The long and bloody battle of Tours was fought between the two. But the light Arabs with their scimitars could not stand against the whirling battle-axes of the Franks. There was monstrous slaughter, and the Arabs fell back towards the south. But they were not driven out of France. For years they held the south of Aquitaine and Septimania, along the Mediterranean.

German historians were especially ardent in their praise of Charles Martel; Schlegel speaks of this "mighty victory", and tells how "the arm of Charles Martel saved and delivered the Christian nations of the West from the deadly grasp of all-destroying Islam." Creasy quotes Leopold von Ranke's opinion that this period was

one of the most important epochs in the history of the world, the commencement of the eighth century, when on the one side Mohammedanism threatened to overspread Italy and Gaul, and on the other the ancient idolatry of Saxony and Friesland once more forced its way across the Rhine. In this peril of Christian institutions, a youthful prince of Germanic race, Karl Martell, arose as their champion, maintained them with all the energy which the necessity for self-defense calls forth, and finally extended them into new regions.

The German military historian Hans Delbrück said of this battle "there was no more important battle in the history of the world." (The Barbarian Invasions, p. 441.) Had Charles Martel failed, Henry Hallam argued, there would have been no Charlemagne, no Holy Roman Empire or Papal States; all these depended upon Charles's containment of Islam from expanding into Europe while the Caliphate was unified and able to mount such a conquest. Another great mid era historian, Thomas Arnold, ranked the victory of Charles Martel even higher than the victory of Arminius in its impact on all of modern history: "Charles Martel's victory at Tours was among those signal deliverances which have affected for centuries the happiness of mankind." Louis Gustave and Charles Strauss said "The victory gained was decisive and final, The torrent of Arab conquest was rolled back and Europe was rescued from the threatened yoke of the Saracens."

Charles Oman concluded that:

At [Tours-Poitiers] the Franks fought as they had done two hundred years before at Casilinum, in one solid mass, without breaking rank or attempting to maneuver. Their victory was won by the purely defensive tactics of the infantry square; the fanatical Arabs, dashing against them time after time, were shattered to pieces, and at last, fled under the shelter of night. But there was no pursuit, for Charles had determined not to allow his men to stir a step from the line to chase the broken foe.

John Bagnell Bury, writing at the beginning of the 20th century, said "The Battle of Tours ... has often been represented as an event of the first magnitude for the world's history, because after this, the penetration of Islam into Europe was finally brought to a standstill."

Modern Western historians are clearly divided on the importance of the battle, and where it should rank in military history; see below.

=== Adolf Hitler on the Battle of Tours ===
Albert Speer, Hitler's Armaments Minister, specifically referencing Hitler’s Table Talks, described that Hitler expressed approval of Islam, saying that Hitler had been particularly impressed by what he had heard from a delegation of Arabs. When the Arabs had tried to penetrate Central Europe in the 8th century, they had been driven back at the Battle of Tours; if they had won that battle, the world would have become Muslim (maybe). According to Speer’s comments, Hitler considered that Islam was more suited to the "Germanic" temperament and would have been more compatible to the Germans than Christianity. Historian Mikael Nilsson has noted that the Table Talks where Hitler’s comment came from were heavily distorted and revised, especially by Francois Genoud, who also forged The Testament of Adolf Hitler and likely inserted pro-Arab phrases to reconcile his own support for Arab Nationalism and Terrorism. Speer himself noted that when others were taking down the notes of Hitler speaking in private for the table talks, Hitler expressing even after 1942 his desire to unite the Christian churches into a single established church “as in England” was left out.

Hitler’s above purported statement contradicts several of Hitler’s known statements, many kept by the stenographers of the German Foreign Ministry. In March 1944 Hitler stated that Germany was defending Europe as it had done in the past when it “broke the Arab wave at Poitiers”, and prevented south-eastern Europe from being “lost forever” in the Great Turkish War. Hitler compared Islam to Communism — and Christian Europe’s wars against Islamic empires to his war against the Soviet Union — on numerous occasions, such as in December 1942, January 1943, February 1943 (in a letter to Benito Mussolini), and a second time during March 1944, where he compared the alliance between the Soviet Union and the United Kingdom with the Franco-Ottoman Alliance against the Holy Roman Empire of the German Nation — saying that like France the British were allying themselves with an “anti-European power”, and he referred to Islam as the empowering ideology of the anti-European world similar to Communism in his own day, and like Islam (that he said was built around a “Muslim race”), he claimed Communism flew under a second banner of “Pan-Slavism”.

Hitler also referred to Germany’s Invasion of the Soviet Union as a "Crusade" ("Kreuzzug”, literally translated as “Cross-march”) naming it “Operation Barbarossa” after the crusading Holy Roman Emperor Frederick Barbarossa who set out on a campaign against the Muslim Sultan Saladin.

=== In Muslim history ===
Eastern historians, like their Western counterparts, have not always agreed on the importance of the battle. According to Bernard Lewis, "The Arab historians, if they mention this engagement [the Battle of Tours] at all, present it as a minor skirmish," and Gustave von Grunebaum writes: "This setback may have been important from the European point of view, but for Muslims at the time, who saw no master plan imperiled thereby, it had no further significance." Contemporary Arab and Muslim historians and chroniclers were much more interested in the second Umayyad siege of Constantinople in 718, which ended in a disastrous defeat.

However, Creasy has claimed: "The enduring importance of the battle of Tours in the eyes of the Muslims is attested not only by the expressions of 'the deadly battle' and 'the disgraceful overthrow' which their writers constantly employ when referring to it but also by the fact that no more serious attempts at conquest beyond the Pyrenees were made by the Saracens."

Thirteenth-century Moroccan author Ibn Idhari al-Marrakushi, mentioned the battle in his history of the Maghrib, "al-Bayan al-Mughrib fi Akhbar al-Maghrib." According to Ibn Idhari, "Abd ar-Rahman and many of his men found martyrdom on the balat ash-Shuhada'i (the path of the martyrs)." Antonio Santosuosso points that "they (the Muslims) called the battle's location, the road between Poitiers and Tours, 'the pavement of Martyrs'." However, as Henry Coppée pointed out, "The same name was given to the battle of Toulouse and is applied to many other fields on which the Moslemah were defeated: they were always martyrs for the faith."

Khalid Yahya Blankinship argued that the military defeat at Tours was one of the failures that contributed to the decline of the Umayyad caliphate:

Stretching from Morocco to China, the Umayyad caliphate based its expansion and success on the doctrine of jihad – armed struggle to claim the whole earth for God's rule, a struggle that had brought much material success for a century but suddenly ground to a halt followed by the collapse of the ruling Umayyad dynasty in 750 AD. The End of the Jihad State demonstrates for the first time that the cause of this collapse came not just from internal conflict, as has been claimed, but from a number of external and concurrent factors that exceeded the caliphate's capacity to respond. These external factors began with crushing military defeats at Byzantium, Toulouse, and Tours, which led to the Berber Revolt of 740 in Iberia and Northern Africa.

=== Supporting the significance of Tours as a world-altering event ===
Ninth-century chroniclers recorded the outcome of the battle as a divine judgment in favor of Charles and gave him the nickname Martellus ("The Hammer"). Later Christian chroniclers and pre-20th century historians praised Charles Martel as the champion of Christianity, characterizing the battle as the decisive turning point in the struggle against Islam, a struggle which preserved Christianity as the religion of Europe. According to modern military historian, Victor Davis Hanson "most of the 18th and 19th century historians like Gibbon saw Tours as a landmark battle that marked the high tide of the Muslim advance into Europe." Leopold von Ranke felt that Tours-Poitiers "was the turning point of one of the most important epochs in the history of the world."

Historian William E. Watson writes that "the subsequent history of the West would have proceeded along vastly different currents had "Abd ar-Rahman been victorious at Tours-Poitiers in 732" and that "[a]fter examining the motives for the Muslim drive north of the Pyrenees, one can attach a macrohistorical significance to the encounter ... especially when one considers the attention paid to the Franks in Arabic literature and the successful expansion of Muslims elsewhere in the medieval period."

Victorian writer John Henry Haaren says in Famous Men of the Middle Ages "The battle of Tours or Poitiers as it should be called is regarded as one of the decisive battles of the world. It decided that Christians and not Muslims should be the ruling power in Europe." Bernard Grun delivers this assessment in his "Timetables of History", reissued in 2004: "In 732 Charles Martel's victory over the Arabs at the Battle of Tours stems the tide of their westward advance."

Historian and humanist Michael Grant lists the battle of Tours in the macrohistorical dates of the Roman era. Historian Norman Cantor who specialized in the medieval period, teaching and writing at Columbia and New York University said in 1993: "It may be true that the Arabs had now fully extended their resources and they would not have conquered France, but their defeat (at Tours) in 732 put a stop to their advance to the North."

Military historian Robert W. Martin considers Tours "one of the most decisive battles in all of history." Additionally, historian Hugh Kennedy says "it was clearly significant in establishing the power of Charles Martel and the Carolingians in France, but it also had profound consequences in Muslim Spain. It signaled the end of the ghanima (booty) economy."

Military Historian Paul Davis argued in 1999 "had the Muslims been victorious at Tours, it is difficult to suppose what population in Europe could have organized to resist them." Likewise, George Bruce in his update of Harbottle's classic military history Dictionary of Battles maintains that "Charles Martel defeated the Moslem army effectively ending Moslem attempts to conquer western Europe."

History professor Antonio Santosuosso comments on Charles, Tours, and the subsequent campaigns against Rahman's son in 736–737, that these later defeats of invading Muslim armies were at least as important as Tours in their defense of Western Christendom and its monasteries, the centers of learning that ultimately led Europe out of her Middle Ages. He also makes an argument, after studying the Arab histories of the period, that these were armies of invasion sent by the Caliph not just to avenge Tours, but to begin the end of Christian Europe and bring it into the Caliphate.

Professor of religion Huston Smith says in The World's Religions: Our Great Wisdom Traditions "But for their defeat by Charles Martel in the Battle of Tours in 732, the entire Western world might today be Muslim." Historian Robert Payne on page 142 in The History of Islam said "The more powerful Muslims and the spread of Islam were knocking on Europe's door. And the spread of Islam was stopped along the road between the towns of Tours and Poitiers, France, with just its head in Europe."

Victor Davis Hanson has commented that

Recent scholars have suggested [Tours-Poitiers], so poorly recorded in contemporary sources, was a mere raid and thus a construct of western mythmaking or that a Muslim victory might have been preferable to continued Frankish dominance. What is clear is that [Tours-Poitiers] marked a general continuance of the successful defense of Europe, (from the Muslims). Flush from the victory at Tours, Charles Martel went on to clear southern France from Islamic attackers for decades, unify the warring kingdoms into the foundations of the Carolingian Empire, and ensure ready and reliable troops from local estates.

Paul Davis, another modern historian, says "whether Charles Martel saved Europe for Christianity is a matter of some debate. What is sure, however, is that his victory ensured that the Franks would dominate Gaul for more than a century." Davis writes, "Moslem defeat ended the Moslems' threat to western Europe, and Frankish victory established the Franks as the dominant population in western Europe, establishing the dynasty that led to Charlemagne."

=== Objecting to the significance of Tours as a world-altering event ===
Other historians disagree with this assessment. Alessandro Barbero writes, "Today, historians tend to play down the significance of the battle of [Tours-Poitiers], pointing out that the purpose of the Muslim force defeated by Charles Martel was not to conquer the Frankish kingdom, but simply to pillage the wealthy monastery of St-Martin of Tours". Similarly, Tomaž Mastnak writes:

Modern historians have constructed a myth presenting this victory as having saved Christian Europe from the Muslims. Edward Gibbon, for example, called Charles Martel the savior of Christendom and the battle near Poitiers an encounter that changed the history of the world. ... This myth has survived well into our own times. ... Contemporaries of the battle, however, did not overstate its significance. The continuators of Fredegar's chronicle, who probably wrote in the mid-eighth century, pictured the battle as just one of many military encounters between Christians and Saracens – moreover, as only one in a series of wars fought by Frankish princes for booty and territory. ... One of Fredegar's continuators presented the battle of [Tours-Poitiers] as what it really was: an episode in the struggle between Christian princes as the Carolingians strove to bring Aquitaine under their rule.

The historian Philip Khuri Hitti believes that "In reality, nothing was decided on the battlefield of Tours. The Moslem wave, already a thousand miles from its starting point in Gibraltar – to say nothing about its base in al-Qayrawan – had already spent itself and reached a natural limit."

The view that the battle has no great significance is perhaps best summarized by Franco Cardini in Europe and Islam:

Although prudence needs to be exercised in minimizing or 'demythologizing' the significance of the event, it is no longer thought by anyone to have been crucial. The 'myth' of that particular military engagement survives today as a media cliché, than which nothing is harder to eradicate. It is well known how the propaganda put about by the Franks and the papacy glorified the victory that took place on the road between Tours and Poitiers...

In their introduction to The Reader's Companion to Military History Robert Cowley and Geoffrey Parker summarise this side of the modern view of the Battle of Tours by saying:

The study of military history has undergone drastic changes in recent years. The old drums-and-bugles approach will no longer do. Factors such as economics, logistics, intelligence, and technology receive the attention once accorded solely to battles and campaigns and casualty counts. Words like "strategy" and "operations" have acquired meanings that might not have been recognizable a generation ago. Changing attitudes and new research have altered our views of what once seemed to matter most. For example, several of the battles that Edward Shepherd Creasy listed in his famous 1851 book The Fifteen Decisive Battles of the World rate hardly a mention here, and the confrontation between Muslims and Christians at Poitiers-Tours in 732, once considered a watershed event, has been downgraded to a raid in force.

== See also ==
- Battle of Stilo
- Timeline of the Muslim presence in the Iberian Peninsula
- Siege of Constantinople (717–718)

== Bibliography ==
- Bachrach, Bernard S. (2001). Early Carolingian warfare: prelude to empire. The Middle Ages series. Philadelphia: University of Pennsylvania Press. ISBN 978-0-8122-3533-3.
- Barbero, Alessandro (2004). Charlemagne: father of a continent. Berkeley: University of California Press. ISBN 978-0-520-93044-5.
- Baudot, Marcel (1955). "Localisation et datation de la première victoire remportée par Charles Martel contre les Musulmans". Mémoires et documents publiés par la Société de l'École des Charles (in French). XII (1): 91–105.
- Bede (1849). Giles, J.A. (ed.). Bede's Ecclesiastical history of England. London: H. G. Bohn – via HathiTrust.
- Bennett, Matthew; Bradsbury, Jim; DeVries, Kelly; Dickie, Iain; Jestice, Phyllis G. (2013). Fighting Techniques of the Medieval World, AD 500 – AD 1500: Equipment, combat skills, and tactics. London: Amber Books. ISBN 978-1-909160-47-7.
- Collins, Roger (1989). The Arab Conquest of Spain: 710–797. Oxford, England: Blackwell. ISBN 978-0-631-15923-0.
- Coppée, Henry (2002) [1881]. History of the Conquest of Spain by the Arab Moors, With a Sketch of the Civilization Which They Achieved, and Imparted to Europe. Vol. II. Gorgias Press. ISBN 1-931956-94-4.
- Cowley, Robert and Parker, Geoffrey (Eds.). (2001). The Reader's Companion to Military History. Houghton Mifflin Books. ISBN 0-618-12742-9
- Creasy, Edward Shepherd; Speed, John Gilmer (2001). Decisive Battles of the World (revised ed.). Safety Harbor, Florida: Simon Publications. ISBN 978-1-931541-81-7.; originally published in 1851 as Decisive Battles of the World from Marathon to Waterloo; revised edition with John Gilmer Speed originally published in 1899 by Colonial Press.
- Davis, Paul K. (1999). 100 Decisive Battles From Ancient Times to the Present. Santa Barbara, California: ABC-CLIO. ISBN 978-1-57607-075-8.
- Eggenberger, David, ed. (1985). "Acroinum (Moslem-Byzantine Wars), 739 & Tours (Moslem Invasion of France), 732". An Encyclopedia of Battles: Accounts of Over 1,560 Battles from 1479 B.C. to the Present. Courier (Dover Publications). pp. 3, 441–442. ISBN 978-0-486-24913-1.; a revised edition of Dictionary of Battles published in 1967 by Thomas Y. Crowell.
- El-Hajji, AbdurRahman Ali (n.d.). The Andalusian History, from the Islamic conquest till the fall of Granada 92–897 A.H. (711–1492 C.E.) (2nd ed.). Dar Al-Qalam.
- Fouracre, Paul (2000). The Age of Charles Martel. Medieval World Series. Harlow, England: Longman. ISBN 978-0-582-06475-1.
- Gibbon, Edward The Battle of Tours, The History of the Decline and Fall of the Roman Empire
- Grant, Michael History of Rome
- Grunebaum, Gustave von (2005). Classical Islam: A History, 600 A.D. to 1258 A.D. Aldine Transaction. ISBN 0-202-30767-0
- Hanson, Victor Davis. Carnage and Culture: Landmark Battles in the Rise of Western Power. Anchor Books, 2001. Published in the UK as Why the West has Won. Faber and Faber, 2001. ISBN 0-571-21640-4
- Hitti, Philip Khuri (2002). History of Syria Including Lebanon and Palestine, Vol. 2. Gorgias Press. ISBN 978-1-931956-61-1.
- Lewis, Bernard (1993). Islam and the West. New York: Oxford University Press. ISBN 978-0-19-507619-6.
- Mastnak, Tomaž (2002). Crusading peace: Christendom, the Muslim world, and Western political order. Berkeley, Calif: University of California Press. ISBN 978-0-520-22635-7.
- Oman, Charles William Chadwick (1960). The art of war in the Middle Ages A.D. 378-1515. Ithaca: Cornell University Press. ISBN 0-8014-9062-6.
- Poke, The Battle of Tours, from the book Fifteen Decisive Battles of the World From Marathon to Waterloo by Sir Edward Creasy, MA
- Riché, Pierre (1993). The Carolingians: a family who forged Europe. Middle Ages series. Philadelphia: University of Pennsylvania Press. ISBN 978-0-8122-3062-8.
- Roberts, J. M. (2003). The new History of the world (4th rev. ed.). Oxford: Oxford University Press. ISBN 978-0-19-521927-2.
- Santosuosso, Antonio (2004). Barbarians, Marauders, and Infidels. Westview Press. ISBN 0-8133-9153-9.
- Schoenfeld, Edward J. (2001). "Battle of Poitiers". In Cowley, Robert; Parker, Geoffrey (eds.). The Reader's Companion to Military History. New York: Houghton Mifflin. p. 366. ISBN 978-0-618-12742-9.
- Watson, William E. (1993). "The Battle of Tours-Poitiers Revisited". Providence: Studies in Western Civilization. 2 (1): 51–68 – via De Re Militari: the Society for Medieval Military History.
- White, Lynn Townsend Jr. (1962). Medieval Technology and Social Change. Oxford, England: Oxford University Press. ISBN 978-0-19-500266-9.
- Conquerors and Chroniclers of Early Medieval Spain. Translated by Wolf, Kenneth Baxter. Liverpool, England: Liverpool University Press. 1990. doi:10.3828/978-0-85323-554-5 (inactive 9 August 2025). ISBN 978-0-85323-554-5.
- Akten zur deutschen auswärtigen Politik : 1918 - 1945 ; aus dem Archiv des Auswärtigen Amtes. E,1, 1941 - 1945 ; 12. Dezember 1941 bis 28. Februar 1942 [Documents on German Foreign Policy, 1918–1945: From the Archives of the German Foreign Ministry. Series E, Vol. 1 (1941–1945): 12 December 1941 to 28 February 1942.] (in German). Göttingen: Vandenhoeck & Ruprecht. 1969.
- Akten zur deutschen auswärtigen Politik : 1918 - 1945 ; aus dem Archiv des Auswärtigen Amtes. E,4, 1941 - 1945 ; 1. Oktober bis 31. Dezember 1942 [Documents on German Foreign Policy, 1918–1945: From the Archives of the German Foreign Ministry. Series E, Vol. 4, 1941–1945: 1 October to 31 December 1942] (in German). Göttingen: Vandenhoeck & Ruprecht. 1975.
- Akten zur deutschen auswärtigen Politik. E,5, 1941 - 1945 ; 1. Januar bis 30. April 1943 [Documents on German Foreign Policy. Series E, Vol. 5, 1941–1945; 1 January to 30 April 1943] (in German). Göttingen: Vandenhoeck & Ruprecht. 1978.
- Akten zur deutschen auswärtigen Politik. E,7, 1941 - 1945 ; 1. Oktober 1943 bis 30. April 1944 [Documents on German Foreign Policy. Series E, Vol. 7, 1941–1945; 1 October 1943 to 30 April 1944] (in German). Göttingen: Vandenhoeck & Ruprecht. 1979.
