= Al-Haytham ibn Ubayd al-Kilabi =

Al-Haytham ibn Ubayd al-Kilabi, (Note: The nisba al-Kilābī means "of the Banu Kilab". His father's name is given as ʿUbayd, ʿUfayr and ʿAbīd.) also called al-Kinani (Arabic: الهيثم بن عبيد الكناني, romanized: al-Haytham ibn ʿUbayd al-Kilābī), was the tenth governor of al-Andalus under the Umayyad Caliphate in AD 729–730 (AH 111). He was one of a series of Arabs from Ifriqiya who served as governors in al-Andalus from 721 to 731.

He succeeded Uthman ibn Abi Nis'a al-Khath'ami in April 729. According to the Mozarabic Chronicle (754) (Note: The Latin Mozarabic Chronicle calls him Aleittan.) he reigned one year. The Prophetic Chronicle (883) gives him a more precise term of ten months, while Ibn Habib (878/9) gives him a shorter term of four months. The seventeenth-century Arabic historian al-Maqqari has him ruling down to March 731, a year longer than any other source.

According to the Mozarabic Chronicle, which is the earliest source by far, al-Haytham was appointed by the governor of Ifriqiya to replace Uthman. His term, which is characterised as "troubled" by the chronicler, culminated in an attempted coup d'état:

After Haytham had ruled in a troubled state for ten months, he found out—I do not know by what craft—that some Arabs wished to remove him from power. He captured them and eventually extracted with whips the various details of the rebellion. After torturing them, he cut off their heads, as he had been secretly ordered to do by his counterparts on the other side of the sea.

The relatives of some of those executed appealed to the governor of Ifriqiya, who "not many days later" sent a certain Muhammad with an authorization to replace al-Haytham with Abd al-Rahman ibn Abd Allah al-Ghafiqi, who had previously served as interim governor in 721. According to Ibn al-Athir, al-Haytham died in office in February or March 730 and was replaced by al-Ghafiqi, but the Mozarabic Chronicle is more trustworthy here. It recounts that al-Ghafiqi could not immediately be found and so Muhammad "not many days later" arrested al-Haytham and brought him back with him to Ifriqiya. He was succeeded by Muhammad ibn Abd Allah al-Ashja'i.

== Sources ==
- Christys, Ann (2003). "The Transformation of Hispania after 711". In Hans Werner Goetz; Jörg Jarnut; Walter Pohl (eds.). Regna and Gentes: The Relationship between Late Antique and Early Medieval Peoples and Kingdoms in the Transformation of the Roman World. Leiden: E. J. Brill. pp. 219–241.
- Collins, Roger (1989). The Arab Conquest of Spain, 710–797. London: Basil Blackwell.
- Collins, Roger (1995). Early Medieval Spain: Unity in Diversity, 400–1000. New York: St. Martin's Press.
- James, David, ed. (2012). A History of Early al-Andalus: The Akhbār majmūʿa. A Study of the Unique Arabic Manuscript in the Bibliothèque Nationale de France, Paris, with a Translation, Notes and Comments. London and New York: Routledge.
- Latham, J. D. (1960). "al-Andalus: (vi) General Survey of the History of al-Andalus". In Gibb, H. A. R.; Kramers, J. H.; Lévi-Provençal, E.; Schacht, J.; Lewis, B. & Pellat, Ch. (eds.). The Encyclopaedia of Islam, Second Edition. Volume I: A–B. Leiden: E. J. Brill. pp. 492–497. OCLC 495469456.
- Wolf, Kenneth Baxter, ed. (1999). Conquerors and Chroniclers of Early Medieval Spain (2nd ed.). Liverpool University Press.

Preceded by Uthman ibn Abi Nis'a al-Khath'ami	Umayyad governor of al-Andalus; 729–730	Succeeded by Muḥammad ibn ʿAbd Allāh al-Ashdjaʿī
