= Hudhayfa ibn al-Ahwas al-Qaysi =

Governor of al-Andalus in 728

- حذيفة بن الأحوص القيسي

Governor of Al-Andalus
- In office 728–728
- Preceded by: Yahya ibn Salama al-Kalbi
- Succeeded by: Uthman ibn Abi Nis'a al-Khath'ami

Hudhayfa ibn al-Ahwas al-Qaysi (Arabic: حذيفة بن الأحوص القيسي, romanized: Ḥudhayfa ibn al-Aḥwaṣ al-Ḳaysī) (Note: Also spelled Ḥujefa, Hudjifah, Ḥodjefah ibn al-Ahwan or Hadhīfa ibn al-Aḥusṣ al-ʿAbasī.) was the eighth governor of al-Andalus under the Umayyad caliphate of Damascus. He served for six months in the year AD 728 (AH 110).

Hudhayfa succeeded Yahya ibn Salama al-Kalbi as governor towards the middle of 728. This was probably related to the change in the governorship in Ifriqiya. The previous governor, Bashir, a member of the Banu Kalb like Yahya, died late in 727 and his hand-picked successor was replaced early in 728 by the Caliph Hisham ibn Abd al-Malik. The new governor of Ifriqiya was Ubayda of the Qays Aylan clan. Since the governor of al-Andalus was under the authority of the governor of Ifriqiya, by the middle of the year Yahya (perhaps dead) had been replaced by a Qaysi. Hudhayfa is the last governor whose appointment by the governor of Ifriqiya with the consent of the caliph is recorded in the Chronicle of 754. All subsequent governors seem to have governed independently of Damascus.

The Chronicle of 754 was written in Latin by a contemporary Christian from al-Andalus. It records that Hudhayfa—whose name is spelled Odifa (Note: Or possibly Odiffa.)—was in office for only six months. The Prophetic Chronicle (883) also gives him a term of six months, but the list of governors compiled by the Andalusian scholar Ibn Habib (878/9) has him ruling for a whole year. The 17th-century historian al-Maqqari follows Ibn Habib and dates his term from June or July 728 until April 729.

The Chronicle of 754 criticises Hudhayfa for unspecified "levity" or "frivolity" (levitas), implying that he lacked the virtue of gravitas (dignity) that was considered an imperative of high office. He was succeeded after a brief and unsuccessful term by Uthman ibn Abi Nis'a al-Khath'ami.

== Notes ==
Preceded by Yahya ibn Salama al-Kalbi	Umayyad governor of al-Andalus; 728	Succeeded by Uthman ibn Abi Nis'a al-Khath'ami
