= Antonio Santosuosso =

Canadian historian (1936–2014)

Antonio Santosuosso (1936-12 July 2014) was a Professor Emeritus of History at the University of Western Ontario in London, Ontario.

== Assessment of the Battle of Tours ==
In Barbarians, Marauders, and Infidels, Santosuosso, considered an expert historian of the Carolingian era, makes a case that the defeats of invading Muslim armies by Charles Martel, including the famous defeat at Tours, were important as in their defense of Western Christianity and the preservation of those Christian monasteries and centres of learning which ultimately led Europe out of the Dark Ages. He also makes a case that while Tours was considered by western historians such as Creasy to be of macrohistorical importance, the later battles were more so. The later invading forces defeated in those campaigns had come to set up permanent outposts for expansion, and there can be no doubt that these three defeats combined broke the back of Islamic expansion in Europe while the Caliphate was still united. Further, Santosuosso dates the ties between the Papacy and the Carolingians to this period, and credits Charles Martel with beginning a much greater martial vigor in Christianity. Dr. Santosuosso in Barbarians, Marauders, and Infidels page 212 says "The stemming of the Muslim advance at Poitiers in 732 and the Frankish kings' decision to become the champions of Papal claims against the Longobards in Italy strengthened the Christian acceptance of the idea of war."

== Sources ==
- Soldiers, Citizens, and the Symbols of War: From Classical Greece to Republican Rome, 500-167 B.C. (1997), ISBN 0-8133-3276-1
- Storming the Heavens: Soldiers, Emperors, and Civilians in the Roman Empire (2001), ISBN 0-8133-3523-X
- Barbarians, Marauders, and Infidels: The Ways of Medieval Warfare (2004), ISBN 0-8133-9153-9
