= Anbasa ibn Suhaym al-Kalbi =

Anbasa ibn Suḥaym al-Kalbi
- عنبسة بن سحيم الكلبي

Governor of Al-Andalus
- In office 721–726
- Preceded by: Abd al-Rahman ibn Abd Allah al-Ghafiqi
- Succeeded by: Udrra ben Abd Allah al-Fihrí

Personal details
- Died: 726

Anbasa ibn Suḥaym al-Kalbi (Arabic: عنبسة بن سحيم الكلبي) was the Muslim wali (governor) of al-Andalus, from 721 to 726. Anbasa belonged to the tribe of Banu Kalb, which was established in southern Syria and northern Arabia since pre-Islamic times.

Immediately after his appointment, Anbasa doubled taxes on Christians; however, it is thought that this increase did not affect most of the recently conquered estates and towns, subdued by treaty on very specific conditions (taxes, land ownership, etc.), but lands under direct Arab rule and new towns being conquered in Septimania.

Coincidentally, a dynastic struggle arose among Muslims in the Middle East. It was sparked by the death of Caliph Yazid II and the succession of his brother, Hisham ibn Abd al-Malik in 724. On this account, Anbasa tried to please the demands imposed by the Caliph to further tax exaction on non-Muslims, with attempts being made to enforce it on non-Arab Muslims too; there was a popular rebellion in Egypt in 725 against increased taxes. On the other hand, this more rigorous approach may have provided legal shelter and security to ownership in al-Andalus.

These actions caused displeasure, scattered acts of disobedience, as well as some open revolts. During his tenure in office, Pelagius of Asturias, defied the Umayyad attempt to extract taxes in the mountains of Asturias, where he gathered a band of rebellious followers. An Umayyad patrol was sent to search for Pelagius and his men, and it was ambushed at the Battle of Covadonga at great loss of life according to heavily mythical Christian sources, a skirmish according to later Muslim chroniclers, who showed little concern for the episode; The Mozarabic Chronicle of 754, a Christian and only almost contemporary account of the major events taking place in Hispania doesn't mention it. In retrospect, these events are viewed by some as the beginning of the Reconquista, an effort by Christian kingdoms to wrest control of Hispania from the Muslims.

Following the major Umayyad defeat in Toulouse (721) resulting in Al-Samh ibn Malik al-Khawlani's death, Anbasa dispatched several military expeditions into Septimania, he crossed the Pyrenees and managed to capture the Visigothic town of Carcassonne in 724 (or 725), as well as Nîmes, the latter without resistance. However, he died of natural causes in 726 during his campaign in Aquitaine. Meanwhile, a flow of refugees found shelter in southern Aquitaine and Provence. He was succeeded as wali by Udrra ben Abd Allah al-Fihrí, who after a few months, was replaced by Yahya ibn Salama al-Kalbi. Yahya denounced the injustices of the policies of Anbasa, especially with respect to the collection of taxes and the confiscation of property.

== See also ==
- Islamic invasion of Gaul
- History of the Jews under Muslim rule
- List of Caliphs

| Preceded by Abd ar-Rahman ibn Abd Allah al-Gafiqi | Governor of Al-Andalus; 721–726 | Succeeded by Udrra ben Abd Allah al-Fihrí |
