= Udhra ibn Abd Allah al-Fihri =

- عذرة بن عبد الله الفهري

Governor of Al-Andalus
- In office 726–726
- Preceded by: Anbasa ibn Suhaym al-Kalbi
- Succeeded by: Yahya ibn Salama al-Kalbi

Udhra ibn Abd Allah al-Fihri (Arabic: عذرة بن عبد الله الفهري) was a fleeting Umayyad governor of Al Andalus in 726. He may have been chosen by Anbasa to succeed him as governor, but his term lasted no more than six months until he completed the task of withdrawing the troops Anbasa had commanded during his last campaign in Gaul.

== See also ==
- Timeline of the Muslim presence in the Iberian peninsula

Preceded by Anbasa ibn Suhaym Al-Kalbi	Governor of Al-Andalus; 726	Succeeded by Yahya ibn Salama al-Kalbi
