= Chronicle of 741 =

The Chronicle of 741 (or Continuatio Byzantia-Arabica or Continuatio Isidoriana) is a Latin-language history in 43 sections or paragraphs, many of which are quite short, which was composed in about the years 741-743 in al-Andalus. It is the earliest known Christian work produced under Muslim rule in Iberia.

== Contents ==
The work is very much shorter than the Chronicle of 754. It contains little Spanish history; the first 14 sections contain very brief mentions of the Visigothic kings up to the reign of Suintila (621-631), taken from the Historia de regibus Gothorum, Vandalorum et Suevorum of Isidore of Seville. The remainder of the content consists of alternating sections dealing with the Byzantine Emperors and the parallel leaders of the Arabs beginning with Muhammad. These sections perhaps derive from the Chronicon Mundi of John of Nikiû and from Arabic or Syriac works which have not survived. Some of these sections contain very brief mentions in passing, of the Arab invasions of North Africa, Spain, France, and parts of the Middle East.

Little if any of the content is original; the value of the work lies in what it reveals of the author and his times.

== Author ==
The work is noted for being pro-Arab and in particular pro-Umayyad. Various theories about the author have been proposed to account for this:

- he was a Christian converted to Islam, or
- a Christian sympathizing with the Arabs, or
- a Christian convert to Islam writing a propaganda piece under the direction of an Arab

Likewise, various cities of origin have been proposed, such as Toledo, Cordoba, Seville or Mérida, but arguments for these are based on very general considerations.

== Date ==
The date of the work cannot be earlier than 741, as it mentions the Byzantine Emperor Leo III and the length of his reign which terminated in that year.

Martín has pointed out that the work contains the words "nostris temporibus" (our times) when saying that the caliphate was then held by a great-grandson of the caliph Marwan I. The first of Marwan's great-grandsons to hold that position was al-Walid II (r. 743–744), and this is likely to represent the date of writing.
