= Yahya ibn Salama al-Kalbi =

- يحيى بن سلامة الكلبي

Governor of Al-Andalus
- In office 726–728
- Preceded by: Udhra ibn Abd Allah al-Fihri
- Succeeded by: Hudhayfa ibn al-Ahwas al-Qaysi

Yahya ibn Salama al-Kalbi (Arabic: يحيى بن سلامة الكلبي) was sent as governor of al-Andalus by the Caliph of Damascus Hisham ibn Abd al-Malik and his tenure in office lasted three years. Yahya belonged to the tribe of Banu Kalb, which was established in southern Syria and northern Arabia.

Yahya denounced the injustices of the policies of Anbasa, especially with respect to the collection of taxes and the confiscation of property from the Christians. On this account the new authoritarian governor prosecuted Arabs and Berbers charged with looting and illicit acquisition of goods from Christians, reverted the tax rates to the levels existing in 722 and undertook a restitution of illegally seized property. He was replaced in his position by the new governor of Ifriqiya, who in turn imposed in al-Andalus a new governor from his rival Arab tribe, the Qays.

== See also ==
- Islamic conquest of Hispania

Preceded by Udhra ibn Abd Allah al-Fihri	Umayyad governor of al-Andalus; 726–728	Succeeded by Hudhayfa ibn al-Ahwas al-Qaysi
