= William E. Watson =

American historian

- Born: New York City
- Education: University of Pennsylvania, Eastern College
- Employer: Immaculata University
- Awards: Lindback Distinguished Teaching Award at Immaculata University
- Website: immaculata.edu/node/253

William E. Watson was born in New York City. He is Professor of History at Immaculata University in Malvern, Pennsylvania. He received his PhD in Medieval History from the University of Pennsylvania. He is the director of the Duffy's Cut Project. He was a Commonwealth Speaker for the Pennsylvania Humanities Council 2006–2007, and was also the recipient of the Lindback Distinguished Teaching Award at Immaculata University for the year 2006–2007. Director of the National Endowment for the Humanities Summer Teachers' Institute at Immaculata University, "Duffy's Cut: Investigating Immigration, Industrialization and Illness in 19th-Century America" (July 2016)

== Books ==
- Massacre at Duffy's Cut: Tragedy and Conspiracy on the Pennsylvania Railroad, William E. Watson and J. Francis Watson (The History Press, 2018)
- Watson, William E.; J. Francis Watson; John H. Ahtes; Earl H. Schandelmeier (2006). The Ghosts of Duffy's Cut: The Irish who Died Building America's Most Dangerous Stretch of Railroad. Connecticut: Greenwood Publishing Group. p. 216. ISBN 0275987272.
- Tricolor and Crescent: France and the Islamic World (Praeger, 2003)
- The Collapse of Communism in the Soviet Union (Greenwood, 1998)
- Irish Americans: The History and Culture of a People, William E. Watson and Eugene J. Halus, Eds. (ABC-Clio, 2015)

== Scholarly articles ==
- "The Irish and Ireland," The Encyclopedia of Greater Philadelphia (2017)
- "Duffy's Cut," The Encyclopedia of Greater Philadelphia (2015)
- "History and Memory at Duffy’s Cut", Railroad History (Fall/Winter, 2014), no. 211, 76–87
- Watson's paper at the Immaculata University Chronicle of Faith Conference (4 April 2008) is availableWatson, William E. (2009). "The Sisters of Charity, the 1832 Cholera Epidemic and Duffy's Cut". U.S. Catholic Historian. 27 (4). The Catholic University of America Press: 1–16. doi:10.1353/cht.0.0022. S2CID 161238750.

Some of his publications in medieval history are available at De Re Militari, the medieval military history society:

- Watson, William E. (2001). "Ibn al-Athir on the Rus: A Commentary and Translation". Canadian-American Slavic Studies. 35 (4, Winter): 423–438. doi:10.1163/221023901X00037.
- Watson, William E. (1993). "The Battle of Tours-Poitiers Revisited". Providence: Studies in Western Civilization. 1 (2). Providence College Press: 51–68.

Watson's paper at the University of Oregon conference The Millennium: Russia and Christianity AD 988-1988 (11 April 1988)

- Watson, William E. (1990). "Arabic Perceptions of Russia's Christian Conversion". The Millennium: Russia and Christianity AD 988-1988, ed. Albert Leong. St. Vladimir's Seminary Press: 33–40. ISBN 9780881410808.

== Dissertation ==
Watson's dissertation at the University of Pennsylvania: Watson, William Ernest (1 January 1990). The hammer and the crescent: Contacts between Andalusi Muslims, Franks, and their successors in three waves of Muslim expansion into Francia. Archived from the original (dissertation) on 17 September 2006.
