= Chronicle of 754 =

Latin-language written work

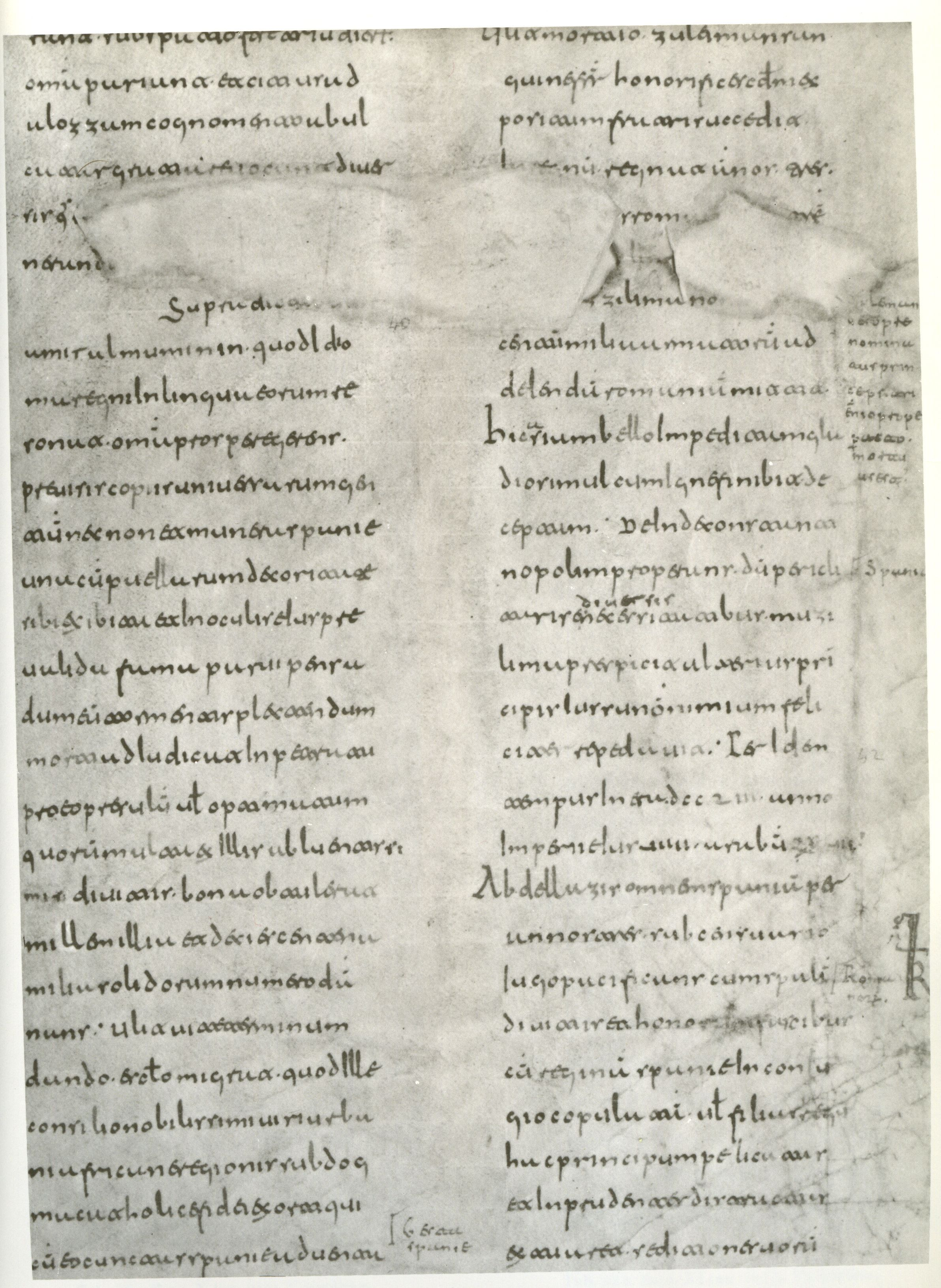
Folio 2r of the Chronicle of 754. The text is in the Visigothic script.

The Chronicle of 754 (also called the Mozarabic Chronicle or Continuatio Hispana) is a Latin-language history in 95 sections, written by an anonymous Mozarab (Christian) chronicler in Al-Andalus. The Chronicle contains the earliest known reference in a Latin text to "Europeans" (europenses), whom it describes as having defeated the Saracens at the battle of Tours in 732.

== Author ==
Its compiler was an anonymous Mozarab (Christian) chronicler, living under Arab rule in some part of the Iberian Peninsula. Since the 16th century, it has been attributed to an otherwise unknown bishop, Isidorus Pacensis but this attribution is now widely accepted as being the result of compounded errors. Henry Wace explained the origin and the phantom history of "Isidorus Pacensis", an otherwise unattested bishop of Pax Julia (modern Beja, Portugal).

There is also some disagreement about the place where the Chronicle was written. Tailhan named Córdoba as the city of origin. Mommsen was the first to champion Toledo. A recent study by Lopez Pereira rejects both these in favour of an unidentified smaller city in present-day south-east Spain.

== The work ==
The Chronicle of 754 covers the years 610 to 754, during which it has few contemporary sources against which to check its veracity. It begins with the accession of Heraclius to the Byzantine throne and is considered an eyewitness account for the Umayyad conquest of Hispania. Some consider it one of the best sources for post-Visigothic history and for the story of the Arabian conquest of Hispania and Septimania; it provided the basis for Roger Collins, The Arab Conquest of Spain, 711-797, the first modern historian to utilise it so thoroughly. It contains the most detailed account of the Battle of Poitiers-Tours.

The style of the entries resembles the earlier chronicler John of Biclar, similarly covering the topics of rulers, rebellions, wars, the church and plagues (but in greater detail, with a more eccentric prose style that has made the work difficult for modern scholars to decipher). The work has three main focal points, the first two Byzantium and Visigothic Spain it shares in common with the Chronicle of 741, adding a third which is the Umayyad conquest.

The Chronicle survives in three manuscripts, of which the earliest, of the ninth century, is divided between the British Library and the Biblioteca de la Real Academia de la Historia, Madrid. The other manuscripts are of the thirteenth and fourteenth centuries.

The Chronicle was first published in its entirety in Pamplona, 1615; it was printed in Migne’s Patr. Lat., vol. 96, p. 1253 sqq. and given a modern critical edition and translated into Spanish by José Eduardo Lopez Pereira. An English translation by Kenneth Baxter Wolf can be found in his volume Conquerors and Chroniclers of Early Medieval Spain (Liverpool, 1990).
