= Mosque–Cathedral of Córdoba =

Cathedral and former mosque in Córdoba, Spain

- Cathedral of Our Lady of the Assumption
- Mezquita-Catedral de Córdoba (Spanish)
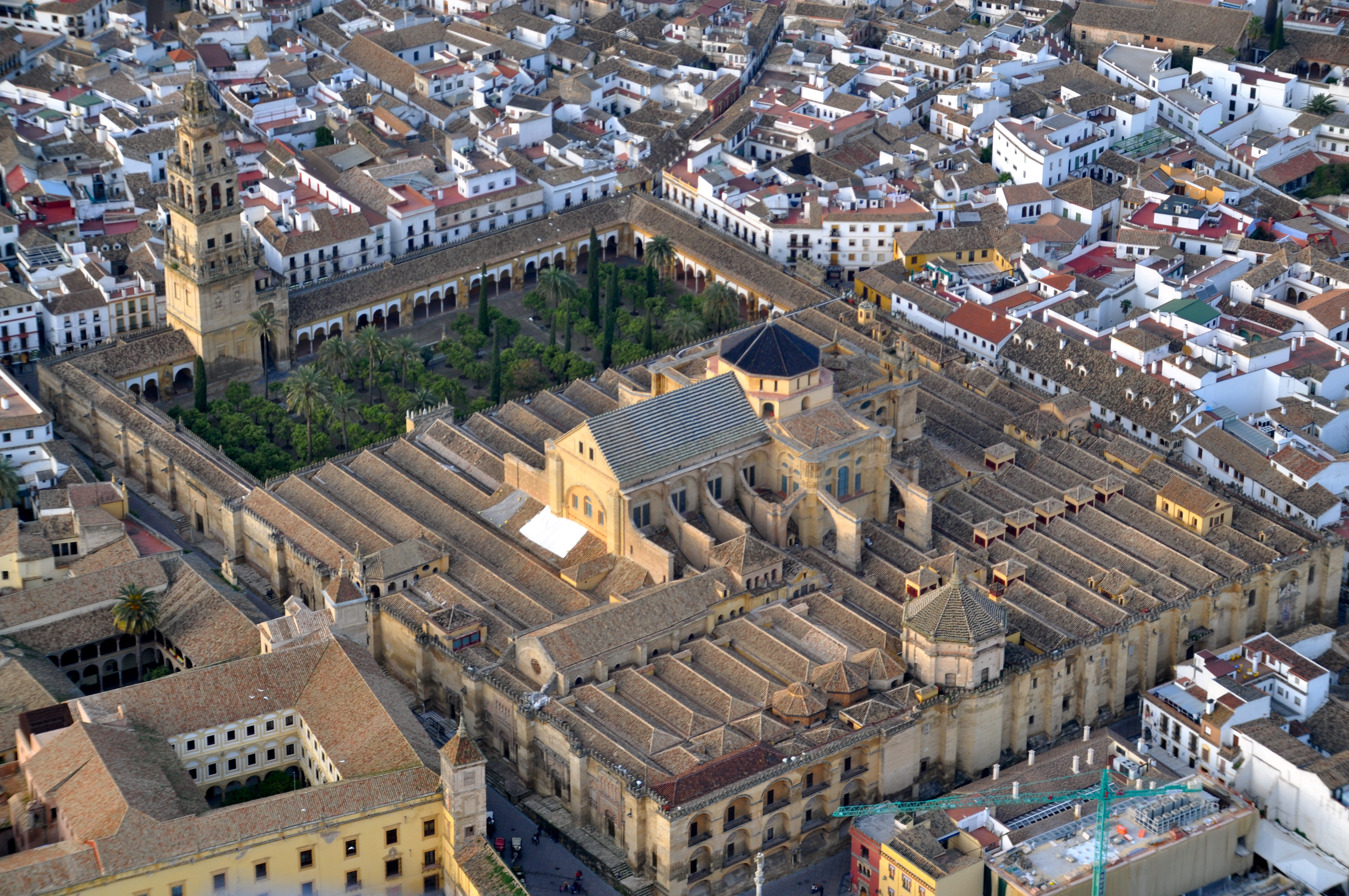
- Mosque–Cathedral of Córdoba
- 37°52′45″N 04°46′47″W
- Location: Córdoba
- Address: 1, Cardenal Herrero Street
- Country: Spain
- Denomination: Catholic Church
- Previous denomination: Islam (785–1236)
- Sui iuris church: Latin Church
- Website: mezquita-catedraldecordoba.es

History
- Status: Cathedral
- Founder: Abd al-Rahman I (as a mosque)
- Dedication: Assumption of Mary
- Dedicated: 1236

Architecture
- Architectural type: Mosque
- Style: Moorish, Renaissance (with Gothic and Baroque elements)
- Groundbreaking: 785 (as a mosque)
- Completed: 1607 (last major addition as cathedral)

Administration
- Metropolis: Seville
- Diocese: Diocese of Córdoba

Clergy
- Bishop: Demetrio Fernández González

UNESCO World Heritage Site
- Criteria: Cultural: i, ii, iii, iv
- Designated: 1984 (8th session)
- Part of: Historic Centre of Cordoba
- Reference no.

Spanish Cultural Heritage
- Type: Non-movable
- Criteria: Monument
- Designated: 21 November 1882
- Reference no.: RI-51-0000034

The Mosque–Cathedral of Córdoba (Spanish: Mezquita-Catedral de Córdoba [meθˈkita kateˈðɾal de ˈkoɾðoβa]) is the cathedral of the Roman Catholic Diocese of Córdoba in the Spanish region of Andalusia. Officially called the Cathedral of Our Lady of the Assumption (Spanish: Catedral de Nuestra Señora de la Asunción), it is dedicated to the Assumption of Mary. Due to its status as a former mosque, it is also known as the Mezquita (Spanish for 'mosque') and, in a historical sense, as the Great Mosque of Córdoba.

According to traditional accounts, a Visigothic church, the Catholic Christian Basilica of Vincent of Saragossa, originally stood on the site of the current Mosque-Cathedral, although this has been a matter of scholarly debate. The Great Mosque was constructed in 785 on the orders of Abd al-Rahman I, founder of the Islamic Emirate of Córdoba. It was expanded multiple times afterwards under Abd al-Rahman's successors up to the late 10th century. Among the most notable additions, Abd al-Rahman III added a minaret (finished in 958), and his son al-Hakam II added a richly decorated new mihrab and maqsurah section (finished in 971). The mosque was converted to a cathedral in 1236 when Córdoba was captured by the Christian forces of Castile during the Reconquista. The structure itself underwent only minor modifications until a major building project in the 16th century inserted a new Renaissance cathedral nave and transept into the center of the building. The former minaret, which had been converted to a bell tower, was also significantly remodelled around this time. Starting in the 19th century, modern restorations have, in turn, led to the recovery and study of some of the building's Islamic-era elements. Today, the building continues to serve as the city's cathedral, and Mass is celebrated there daily.

The mosque structure is an important monument in the history of Islamic architecture and was highly influential on the subsequent "Moorish" architecture of the western Mediterranean regions of the Muslim world. It is also one of Spain's major historic monuments and tourist attractions, as well as a UNESCO World Heritage Site since 1984.

== History ==
=== Claims of earlier Roman temple ===
A claim that the site of the mosque-cathedral was once a Roman temple dedicated to Janus dates as far back as Pablo de Céspedes and is sometimes still repeated today. However, Robert Knapp, in his 1983 study of Roman-era Córdoba, dismissed this claim as speculation based on a misunderstanding of Roman milestones found in the area.

=== Visigothic church ===
According to traditional accounts, the present-day site of the Cathedral–Mosque of Córdoba was originally a Visigothic Christian church dedicated to Saint Vincent of Saragossa, which was divided and shared by Christians and Muslims after the Umayyad conquest of Hispania. As the Muslim community grew and this existing space became too small for prayer, the basilica was expanded little by little through piecemeal additions to the building. This sharing arrangement of the site lasted until 785, when the Christian half was purchased by Abd al-Rahman I, for a hundred thousand dinars. He then demolished the church structure and built the new mosque on its site. In return, Abd al-Rahman also allowed the Christians to build or rebuild some churches outside the city walls. These included churches dedicated to the Christian martyrs Saints Faustus, Januarius, and Marcellus whom they deeply revered.

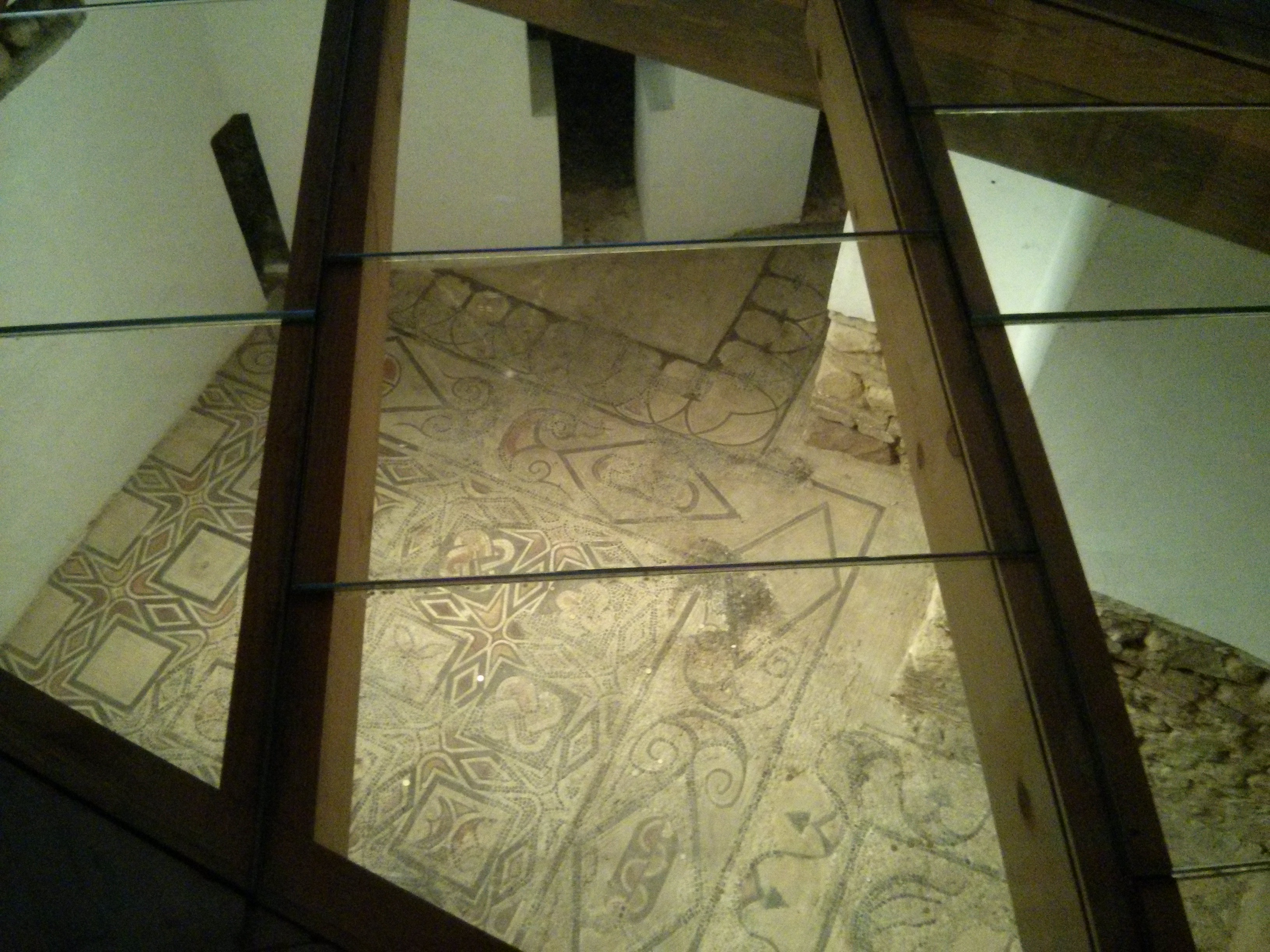
Excavated Late Roman or Visigothic mosaics visible under the floor of the Mosque-Cathedral today

The historicity of this narrative has been challenged as archaeological evidence is scant and the narrative is not corroborated by contemporary accounts of the events following Abd al-Rahman I's initial arrival in al-Andalus. The narrative of the church being transformed into a mosque, which goes back to the tenth-century historian Al-Razi, echoed similar narratives of the Islamic conquest of Syria, in particular the story of building the Umayyad Mosque in Damascus. For medieval Muslim historians, these parallels served to highlight a dynastic Umayyad conquest of Spain and appropriation of Visigothic Córdoba. Another tenth-century source mentions a church that stood at the site of the mosque without giving further details. An archaeological exhibit in the mosque–cathedral of Cordoba today displays fragments of a Late Roman or Visigothic building, emphasizing an originally Christian nature of the complex. The "stratigraphy" of the site is complicated and made more so by the impact of contemporary political debates about cultural identity in Spain.

According to Susana Calvo Capilla, a specialist on the history of the mosque–cathedral, although remains of multiple church-like buildings have been located on the territory of the mosque–cathedral complex, no clear archaeological evidence has been found of where either the church of St. Vincent or the first mosque were located on the site, and the latter may have been a newly constructed building. The evidence suggests that it may have been the grounds of an episcopal complex rather than a particular church which were initially divided between Muslims and Christians. Pedro Marfil, an archeologist at the University of Cordoba, has argued for the existence of such a complex – including a Christian basilica – on this site by interpreting the existing archeological remains. D. Fairchild Ruggles, a scholar of Islamic art, considers previous archeological work to be a confirmation of the former church's existence. This theory has been opposed by Fernando Arce-Sainz, another archeologist, who states that none of the numerous archeological investigations in modern times have turned up remains of Christian iconography, a cemetery, or other evidence that would support the existence of a church. Art historian Rose Walker, in an overview of late antique and early medieval art in Spain, has likewise criticized Marfil's view as relying on personal interpretation. More recently, María de los Ángeles Utrero Agudo and Alejandro Villa del Castillo have argued that evidence so far does not allow for the identification of former ecclesiastical structures on the site, while archeologists Alberto León Muñoz and Raimundo Ortiz Urbano have affirmed the hypothesis of a large episcopal complex by analyzing both old and new archeological findings at the site.

Regardless of what structures may have existed on the site, however, it is almost certain that the building which housed the city's first mosque was destroyed to build Abd ar-Rahman I's Great Mosque and that it had little relation to the latter's form.

=== Construction of the mosque ===
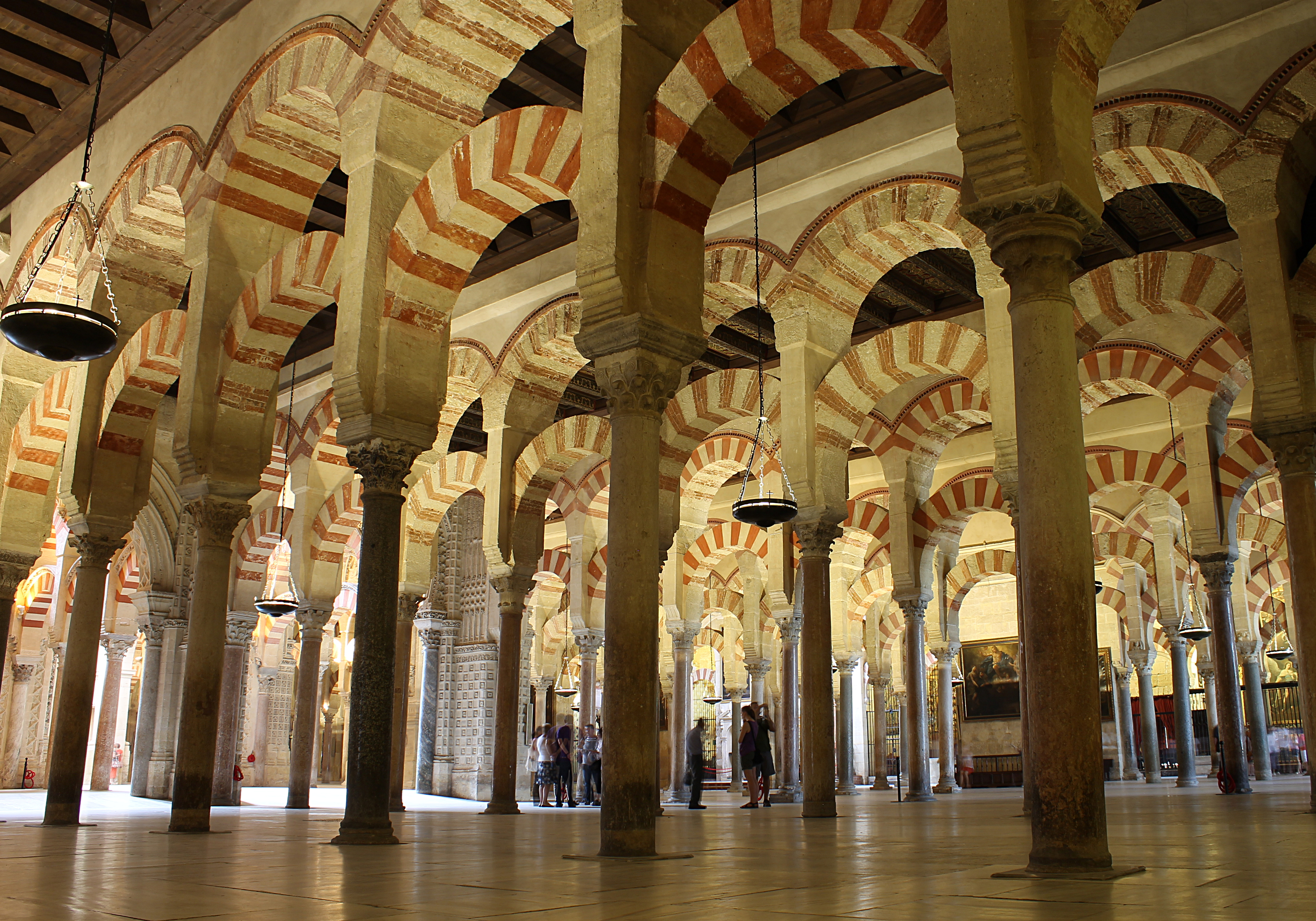
The columns and two-tiered arches in the original section of the mosque building. The columns and capitals are spolia from earlier structures.

The Great Mosque was built in the context of the new Umayyad Emirate in Al-Andalus which Abd ar-Rahman I founded in 756. Abd ar-Rahman was a fugitive and one of the last remaining members of the Umayyad royal family which had previously ruled the first hereditary caliphate based in Damascus, Syria. This Umayyad Caliphate was overthrown during the Abbasid Revolution in 750 and the ruling family were nearly all killed or executed in the process. Abd ar-Rahman survived by fleeing to North Africa and, after securing political and military support, took control of the Muslim administration in the Iberian Peninsula from its governor, Yusuf ibn Abd al-Rahman al-Fihri. Cordoba was already the capital of the Muslim province and Abd ar-Rahman continued to use it as the capital of his independent emirate.

Construction of the mosque began in 785–786 (169 AH) and finished a year later in 786–787 (170 AH). This relatively short period of construction was aided by the reuse of existing Roman and Visigothic materials in the area, especially columns and capitals. Syrian (Umayyad), Visigothic, and Roman influences have been noted in the building's design, but the architect is not known. The craftsmen working on the project probably included local Iberians as well as people of Syrian origin. According to tradition and historical written sources, Abd ar-Rahman involved himself personally and heavily in the project, but the extent of his personal influence in the mosque's design is debated.

==== Original layout ====
The original mosque had a roughly square floor plan measuring 74 or 79 meters per side, equally divided between a hypostyle prayer hall to the south and an open courtyard (sahn) to the north. As the mosque was built on a sloping site, a large amount of fill would have been necessary to create a level ground on which to build. The outer walls were reinforced with large buttresses, which are still visible on the exterior today.The original mosque's most famous architectural innovation, which was preserved and repeated in all subsequent Muslim-era expansions, was its rows of two-tiered arches in the hypostyle hall.

The mosque's original mihrab (niche in the far wall symbolizing the direction of prayer) no longer exists today but its probable remains were found during archeological excavations between 1932 and 1936. The remains showed that the mihrab's upper part was covered with a shell-shaped hood similar to the later mihrab.

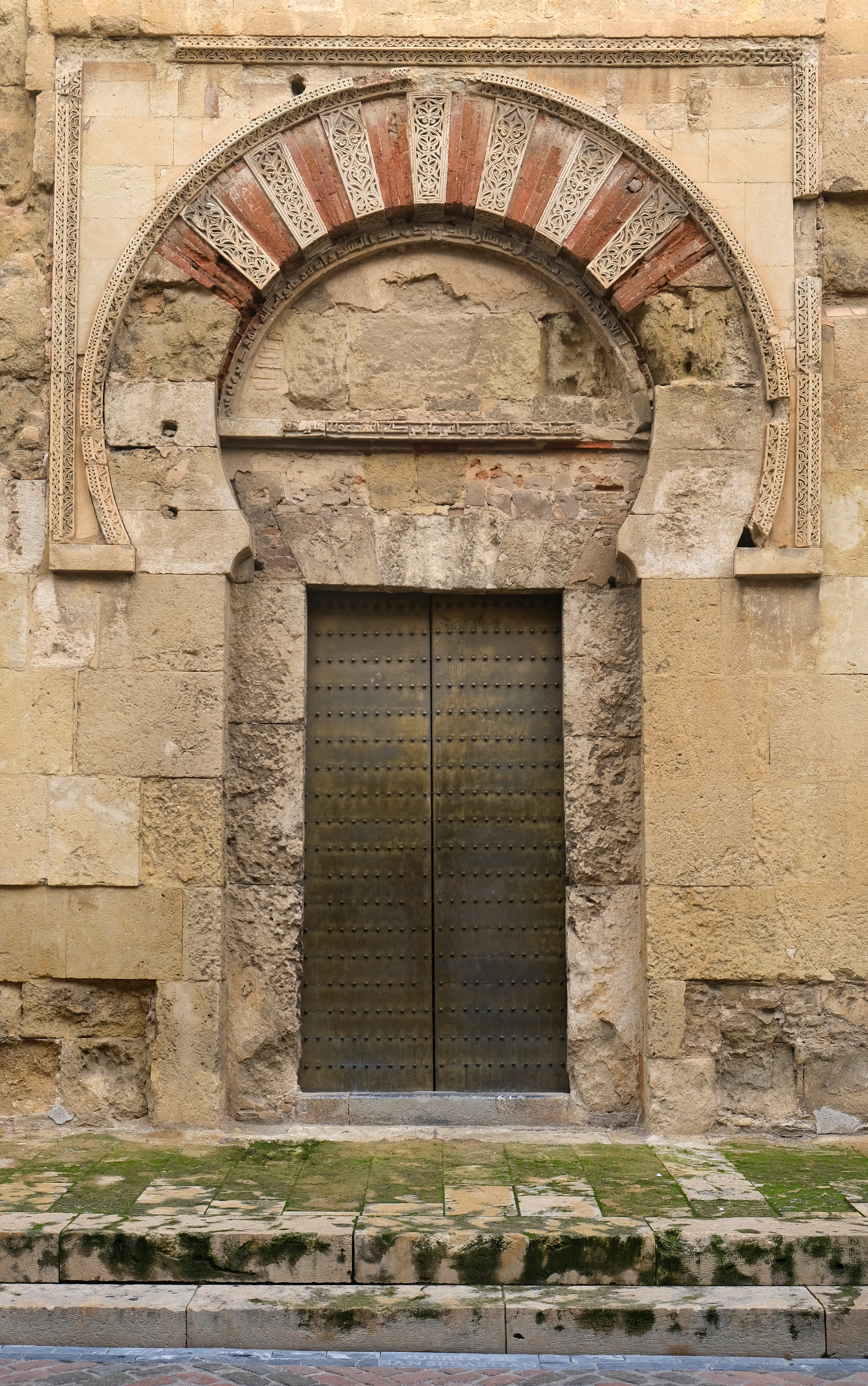
Bab al-Wuzara ("Viziers' Gate", today the Puerta de San Esteban), one of the oldest surviving gates of the mosque. Its decoration dates from 855.

The mosque originally had four entrances: one was in the center of the north wall of the courtyard (aligned with the mihrab to the south), two more were in the west and east walls of the courtyard, and a fourth one was in the middle of the west wall of the prayer hall. The latter was known as Bab al-Wuzara' (the "Viziers' Gate", today known as Puerta de San Esteban) and was most likely the entrance used by the emir and state officials who worked in the palace directly across the street.

The courtyard of the mosque was planted with trees as early as the 9th century, according to written sources cited by the 11th century jurist Ibn Sahl. Although the species of tree is not known, the fact that these were fruit trees is attested in Ibn Sahl, who was consulted as to whether such a garden was forbidden and, if not forbidden, whether it was permitted to eat from it. That the trees remained in the courtyard is demonstrated by two seals of the City of Cordoba, one in 1262 and the other in 1445, both of which show the mosque (which by then had been converted to a cathedral) with tall palm trees within its walls. This evidence makes the Cordoba mosque the earliest one where trees are known to have been planted in the courtyard.

==== Qibla alignment ====
Mosques were normally aligned with the qibla (the direction of prayer), which is theoretically the direction of Mecca. From Cordoba, Mecca is to the east-southeast, but the Great Mosque of Cordoba is instead oriented more towards the south. This orientation, which doesn't match that of modern mosques, reflects the pre-existing street alignment of Roman Cordoba.

It is also due to historical differences in opinion about the appropriate direction of the qibla in far western Islamic lands like al-Andalus and Morocco. In this early period, many Muslims in the region preferred a tradition that existed in the western Islamic world (the Maghreb and al-Andalus) according to which the qibla should be oriented towards the south instead of pointing towards the shortest distance to Mecca. This was based on a saying (hadith) of Muhammad which stated that "What is between the east and west is a qibla", which thus legitimized southern alignments.

This practice may also have sought to emulate the orientation of the walls of the rectangular Kaaba building inside the Great Mosque of Mecca, based on another tradition which considered the different sides of the Kaaba as being associated with different parts of the Muslim world. In this tradition the northwest face of the Kaaba was associated with al-Andalus and, accordingly, the Great Mosque of Cordoba was oriented towards the southeast as if facing the Kaaba's northwestern façade, with its main axis parallel to the main axis of the Kaaba structure (which was oriented from southeast to northwest).

Although later mosques in Al-Andalus did have more eastern-facing orientations (e.g. the Mosque of Madinat al-Zahra in the 10th century), later expansions of the Great Mosque did not attempt to modify its original alignment.

=== Expansions of the mosque ===
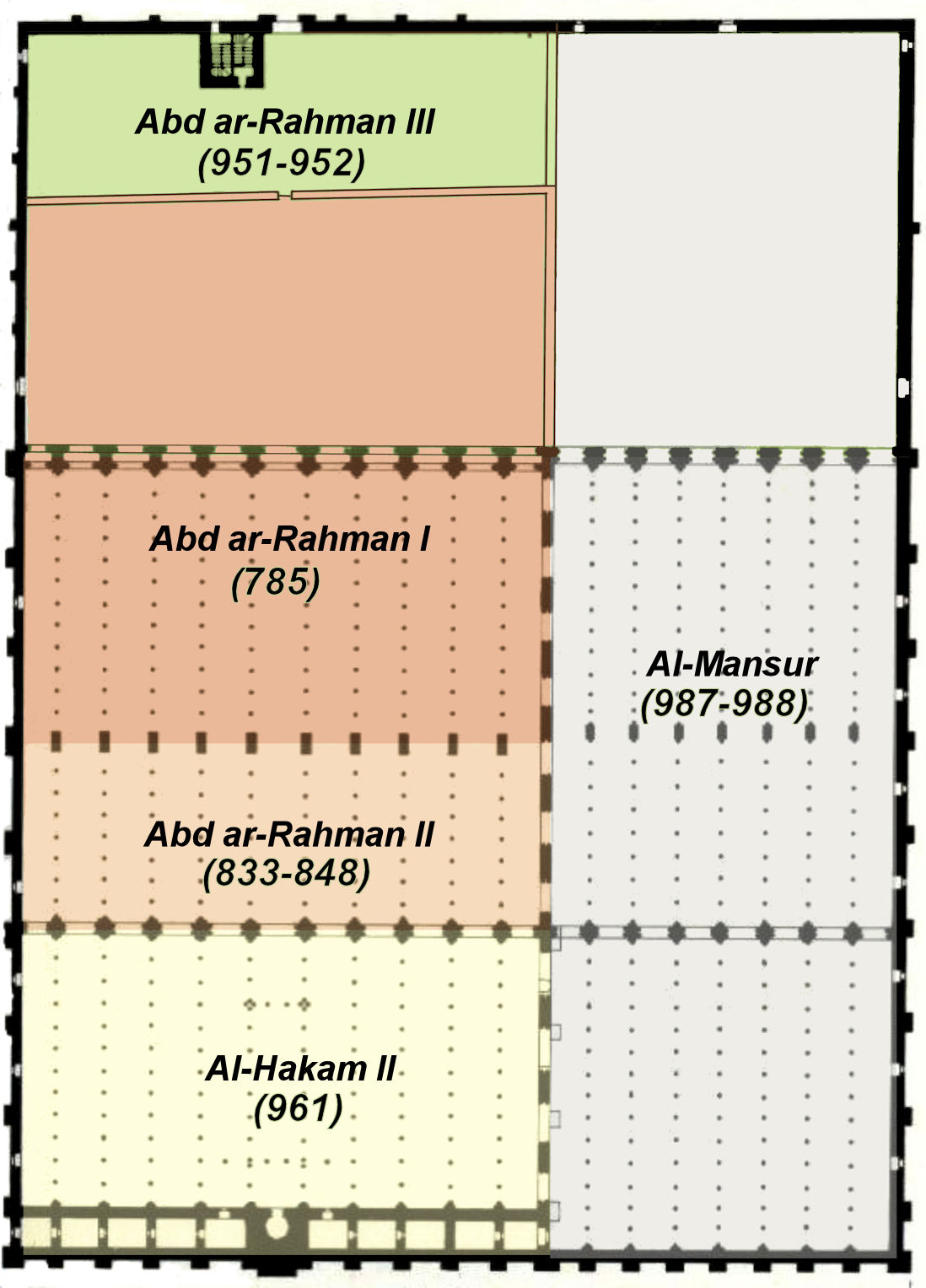
Floor plan of the expanded mosque, with each major historical phase of expansion labelled for the ruler who commissioned it and the documented starting date (which sometimes varies depending on the sources)

==== First additions ====
In 793 Abd ar-Rahman I's son and successor, Hisham I, added to the mosque a ṣawma'a, a shelter for the muezzin on top of the outer wall, as the mosque did not yet have a minaret (a feature which was not yet standard in early mosques).

The mosque was significantly expanded by Abd ar-Rahman II (r. 822–852) sometime between the years 833 and 848. (Note: Some authors cite a specific year for the expansion. Jerilynn Dodds cites the year 836 while Susana Calvo Capilla gives the year as 848.) This expansion preserved and repeated the original design while extending the prayer hall eight bays to the south (i.e. the length of eight arches). This made the prayer hall 64 metres long from front to back.

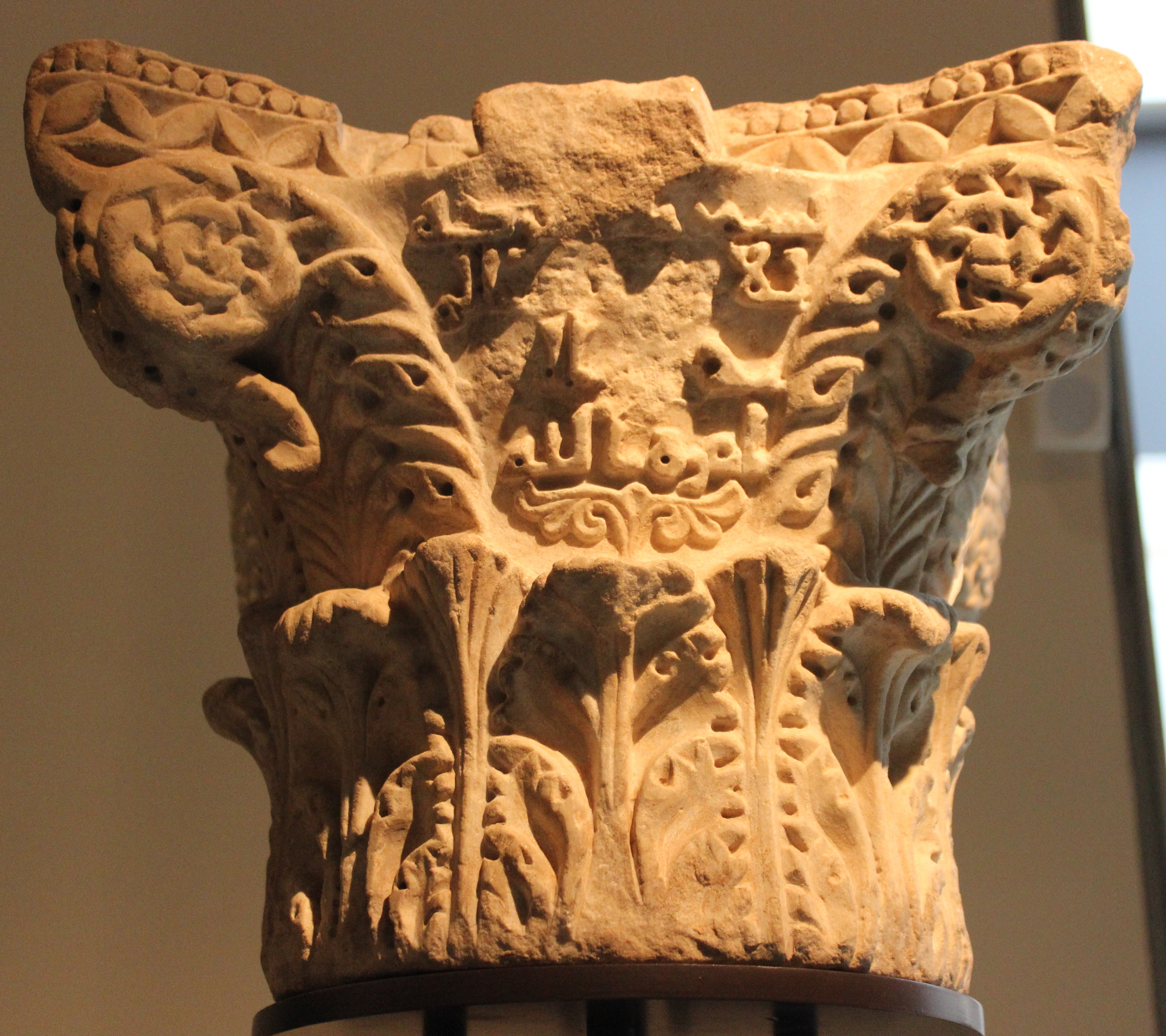
Marble capital from the time of Abd ar-Rahman II (9th century), probably made for his expansion of the mosque, now kept at the National Archaeological Museum in Madrid. The Arabic inscription translated as: "In the name of God; blessing for the amir 'Abd ar-Rahman, son of al-Hakam; may God honour him."

During this expansion, the builders began to commission new marble capitals for the columns instead of just re-using ancient ones. These new capitals were imitations of the Corinthian style but still differed slightly from classical models, thus hinting at the future evolution of architectural sculpture in al-Andalus. One probable example of these capitals is now preserved at the National Archaeological Museum in Madrid and features an Arabic inscription in an archaic Kufic script that offers blessings on Abd ar-Rahman II. The expansion work may have been unfinished when Abd ar-Rahman II died in 852 and it appears to have been completed instead by his son and successor, Muhammad I (r. 852–886).

Muhammad I carried out various other works on the mosque and is reported to have created a maqsura (a prayer space reserved for the ruler). In 855 he also restored the Bab al-Wuzara' gate (today's Puerta de San Esteban). The decoration of this gate, which thus likely dates from this time, is often noted as an important prototype of later Moorish gateways. Muhammad's son, Al-Mundhir (r. 886–888), in turn added a treasury to the mosque. Al-Mundhir's son, Abdallah (r. 888–912), built the mosque's first elevated passage, known as a sabat, which connected the mosque directly with the Umayyad palace across the street. This passage allowed the ruler thenceforth to enter the mosque privately, where he would remain unseen behind the screen of the maqsura, thus separating him from the general public during prayer. New versions of this bridge would later be rebuilt during the mosque's subsequent expansions.

==== Expansion of Abd ar-Rahman III ====
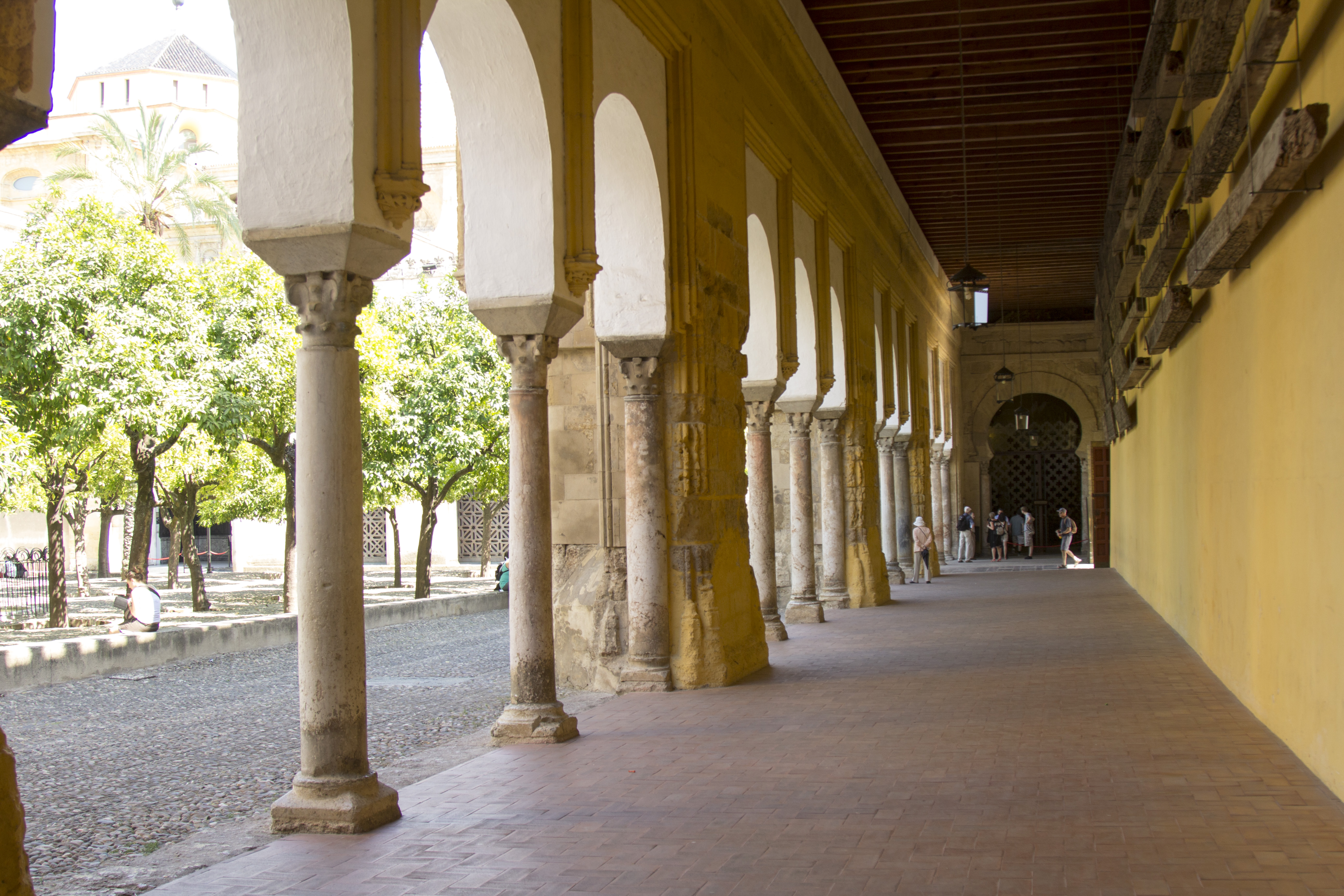
Abd ar-Rahman III also expanded the courtyard and probably added a gallery around the edges. (The current gallery was rebuilt by architect Hernán Ruiz I in the 16th century.)

In the 10th century Abd ar-Rahman III (r. 912–961) declared a new Caliphate in al-Andalus and inaugurated the height of Andalusi power in the region. As part of his various construction projects, he reworked and enlarged the courtyard of the Great Mosque and built its first true minaret (a tower from which the call to prayer was issued) starting in 951–952. The new works, including the minaret, were completed in 958, as recorded by a surviving inscription on a marble plaque that includes the name of Abd ar-Rahman III as well as the names of the master builder and the supervisor of works.

The minaret was 47 meters high and had a square base measuring 8.5 meters per side. Scholar Jonathan Bloom suggests that Abd ar-Rahman III's construction of the minaret – along with his sponsoring of other minarets around the same time in Fez, Morocco – was partly intended as a visual symbol of his growing authority as caliph and may have also been aimed at defying the rival Fatimid Caliphate to the east, which eschewed such structures.

Abd ar-Rahman III also reinforced the northern wall of the courtyard by adding another "façade" in front of the old one on the courtyard side. Historical accounts differ on whether the completed courtyard had a surrounding gallery or portico (as seen today and as was common in the courtyards of other mosques). Many modern scholars affirm that the courtyard was provided with an enveloping gallery at this time and that its design involved an alternation between piers and columns (similar to its current appearance).

==== Expansion of al-Hakam II ====
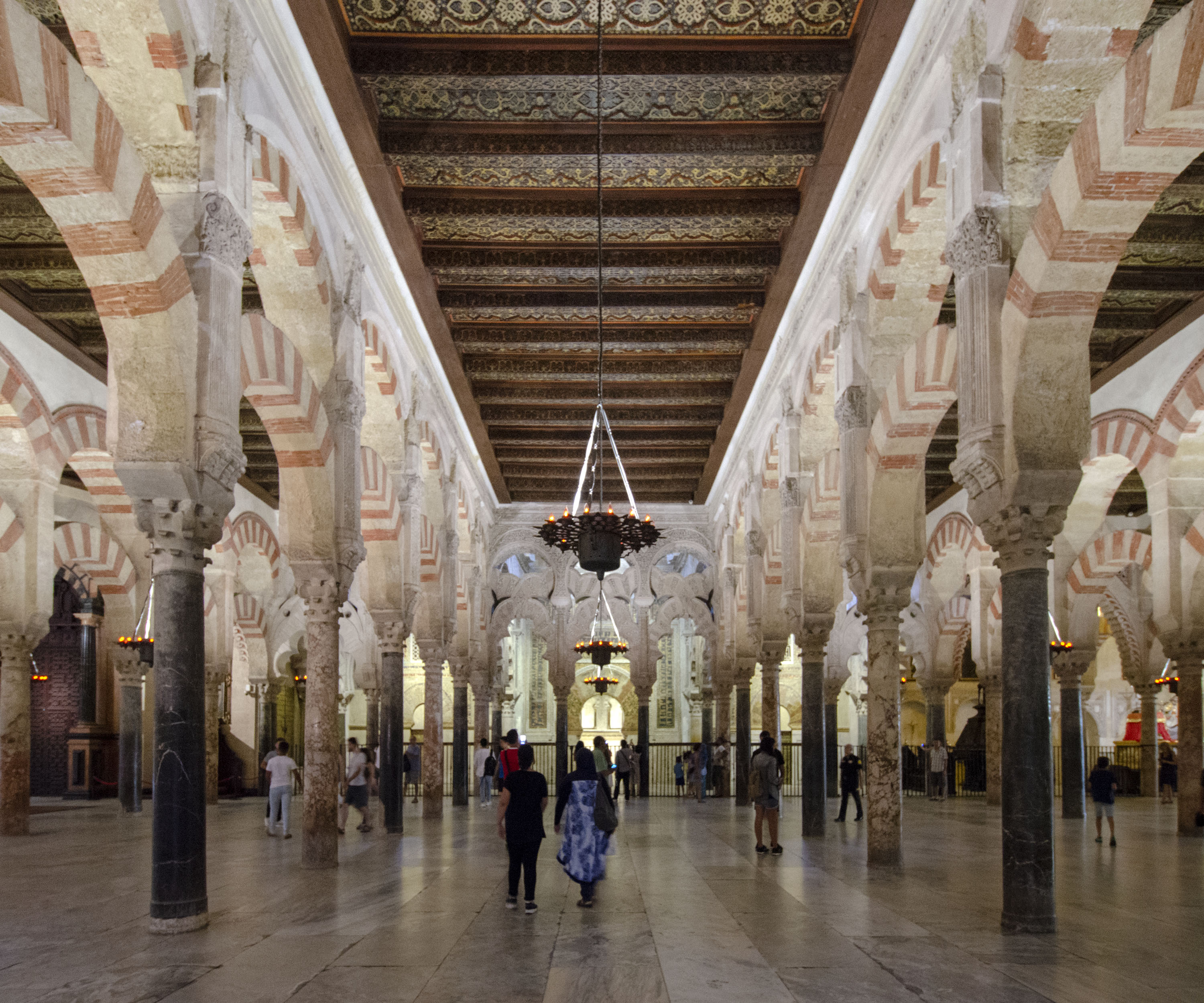
View of the nave leading towards the mihrab, in the extension commissioned by al-Hakam II in 961

Abd ar-Rahman III's son and successor, al-Hakam II (r. 961–976), was a cultured man who was involved in his father's architectural projects. During his own reign, starting in 961, he further expanded the mosque's prayer hall. The hall was extended 45 meters to the south by adding 12 more bays (arches), again repeating the two-tiered arches of the original design. This expansion is responsible for some of the mosque's most significant architectural flourishes and innovations.

At the beginning of al-Hakam's extension, the central "nave" of the mosque was highlighted with an elaborate ribbed dome (now part of the Capilla da Villaviciosa). More famously, a rectangular maqsura area around the mosque's new mihrab was distinguished by a set of unique interlacing multifoil arches. The rectangular area within this, in front of the mihrab, was covered by three more decorative ribbed domes. The domes and the new mihrab niche were finished in November or December 965. An inscription records the names of four of its craftsmen, who also worked at the Reception Hall (Salon Rico) of Madinat al-Zahra.

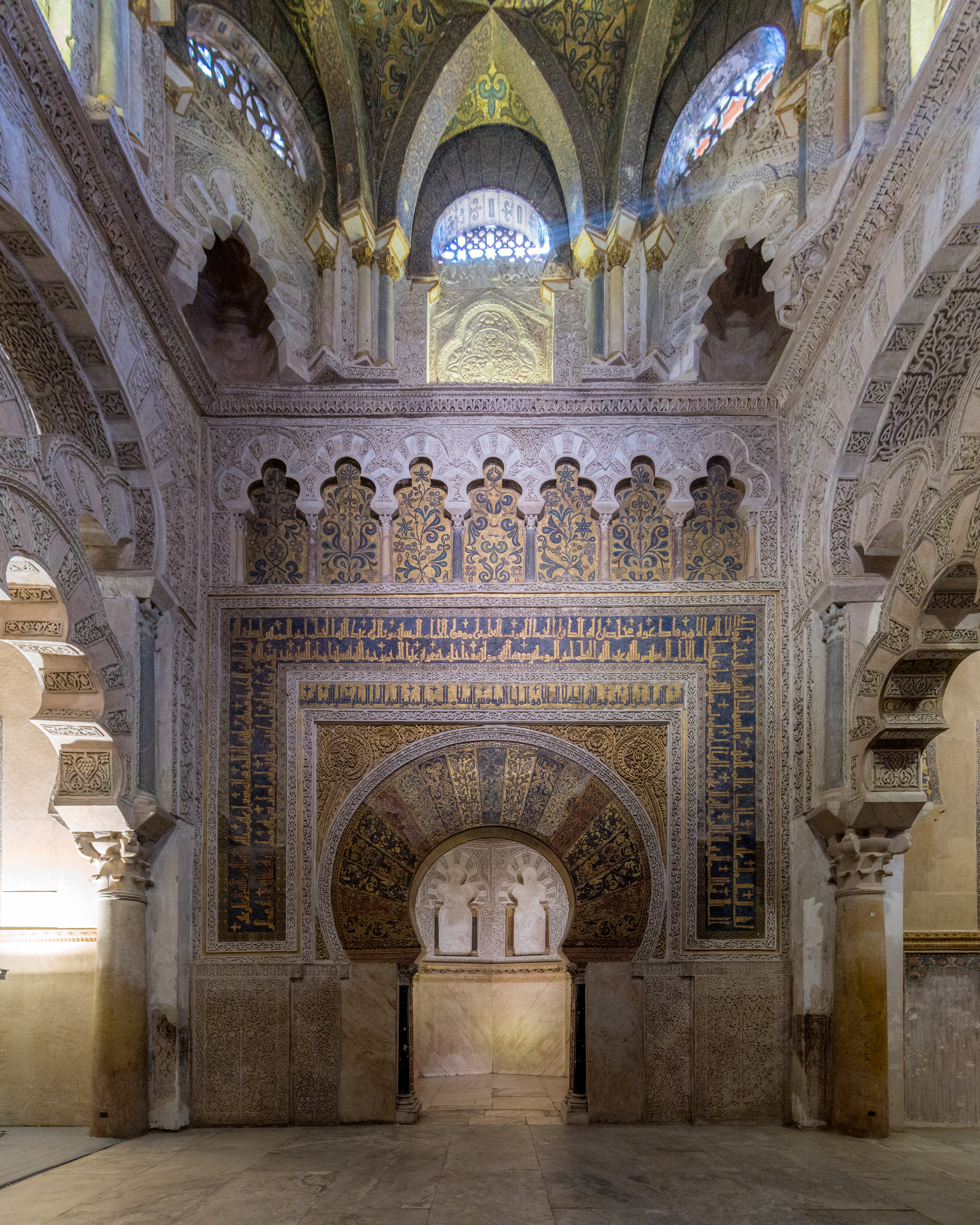
The mihrab

Soon after this date both the middle dome of the maqsura and the wall surfaces around the mihrab were covered in rich Byzantine-influenced gold mosaics. According to traditional accounts like that of Ibn 'Idhari, al-Hakam II had written to the Byzantine emperor (initially Nikephoros II Phokas) in Constantinople requesting that he send him expert mosaicists for the task. The emperor consented and sent him a master craftsman along with about 1600 kg of mosaic tesserae as a gift. The mosaicist trained some of the caliph's own craftsmen, who eventually became skilled enough to do the work on their own. The work was finished by this team in late 970 or early 971.

Ibn 'Idhari claimed that the decision to add mosaics with Byzantine craftsmen was in imitation of the Umayyad caliph al-Walid I in the early 7th century, who commissioned the Great Mosque of Damascus with mosaic decoration that was also reportedly accomplished with Byzantine help. Mosaic decoration was also a characteristic of other Umayyad constructions of that era in the Levant – such as the Dome of the Rock, the Prophet's Mosque, and the al-Aqsa Mosque – but was not previously known in al-Andalus. Some scholars have interpreted al-Hakam's renovations as an attempt to publicly associate the new Umayyad caliphate in al-Andalus with the former Umayyad caliphs in Syria, thus further strengthening his legitimacy and challenging that of the contemporary Abbasid and Fatimid caliphs.

Al-Hakam II's work on the mosque also included the commissioning of a new minbar (pulpit) in 965, which took about 5 to 7 years to finish. Unfortunately, the details of its construction and of its chronology are muddled by sometimes contradictory historical sources. Ibn 'Idhari, for example, implies that Al-Hakam had two minbars built in this period, with one of them possibly having been destroyed or replaced. Either way, whichever minbar survived and became associated with the mosque was celebrated by many writers for its craftsmanship. It was made out of precious woods like ebony, boxwood, and "scented" woods, and it was inlaid with ivory and with other coloured woods such as red and yellow sandalwood. Modern scholars believe the minbar had wheels which allowed it to be rolled in and out of its storage chamber.

==== Expansion of al-Mansur ====
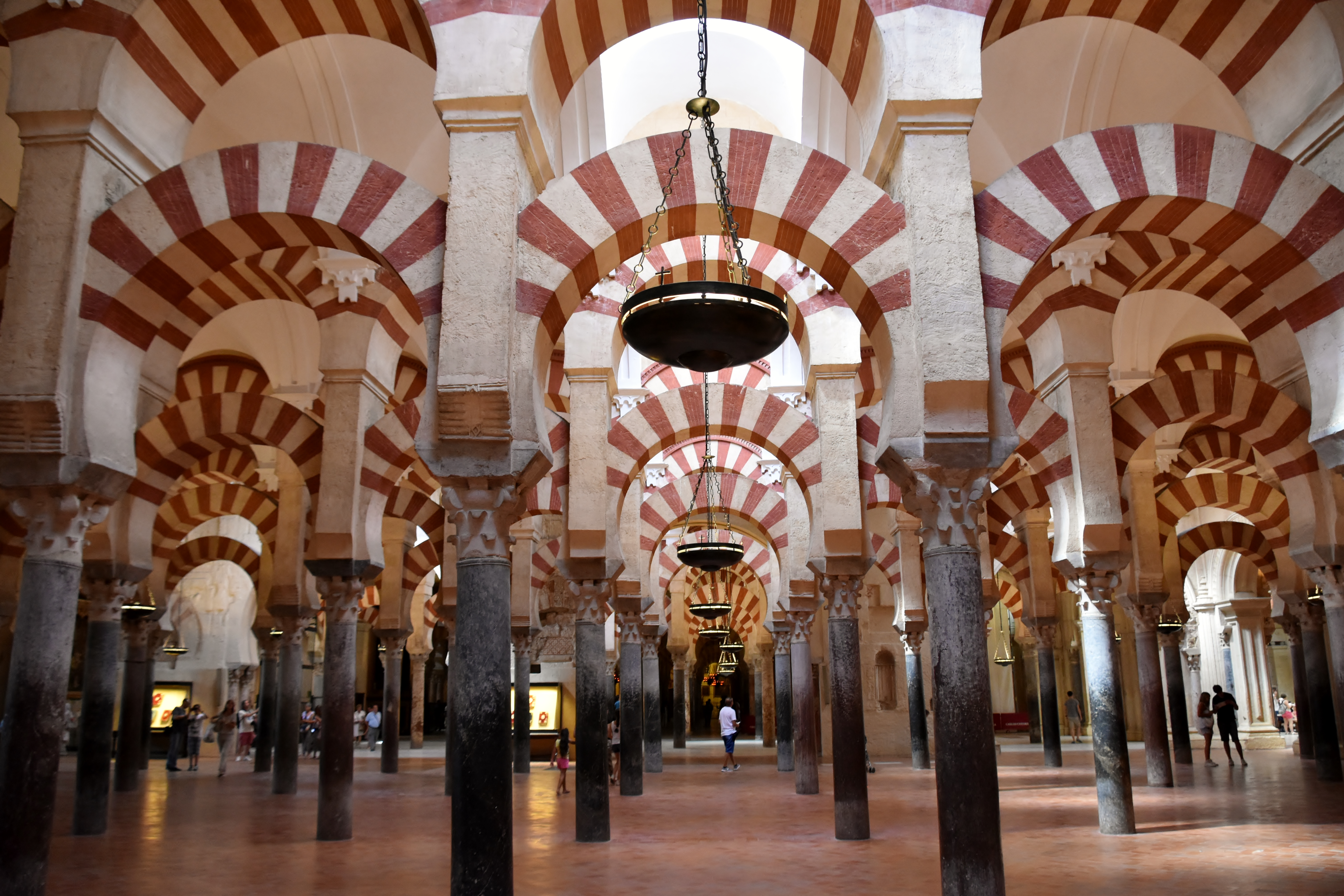
Prayer hall in al-Mansur's extension (after 987)

The mosque's last significant expansion under Muslim rule was ordered by Al-Mansur (Almanzor), the autocratic vizier of Caliph Hisham II, in 987–988. Rather than extending the mosque further south, which would have been impossible due to the proximity of the riverbank, Al-Mansur had the mosque extended laterally towards the east, extending both the courtyard and the prayer hall by 47.76 meters and adding eight naves to the mosque. The new extension covered 8600 square meters and made the mosque the largest in the Muslim world outside of Abbasid Iraq.

Once again, the same design of two-tiered arches was replicated in the new construction. However, the capitals produced for the hundreds of new columns have a simpler and less detailed design that may reflect the hurry in which they were produced.The new eastern wall of the mosque featured ten richly decorated exterior portals similar to the ones on the mosque's western side, although these were heavily restored in the 20th century. Al-Mansur also famously looted the bells of the Cathedral of Santiago de Compostela and reportedly ordered them to be melted down and turned into chandeliers for the mosque, although none of these chandeliers have survived.

=== Later Islamic history of the mosque (11th–12th centuries) ===
After the collapse of the Umayyad Caliphate in Cordoba at the beginning of the 11th century, no further expansions to the mosque were carried out. Indeed, the collapse of authority had immediate negative consequences for the mosque, which was looted and damaged during the fitna (civil conflict) that followed the caliphate's fall (roughly between 1009 and 1030). Cordoba itself also suffered a decline but remained an important cultural center. Under Almoravid rule, the artisan workshops of Cordoba were commissioned to design new richly crafted minbars for the most important mosques of Morocco – most famously the Minbar of the Kutubiyya Mosque commissioned in 1137 – which were likely inspired by the model of al-Hakam II's minbar in the Great Mosque.

In 1146 the Christian army of King Alfonso VII of León and Castile briefly occupied Cordoba. The archbishop of Toledo, Raymond de Sauvetât, accompanied by the king, led a mass inside the mosque to "consecrate" the building. According to Muslim sources, before leaving the city the Christians plundered the mosque, carrying off its chandeliers, the gold and silver finial of the minaret, and parts of the rich minbar. As a result of both this pillage and the earlier pillage during the fitna, the mosque had lost almost all of its valuable furnishings.

In 1162, after a general period of decline and recurring sieges, the Almohad caliph Abd al-Mu'min ordered that Cordoba be prepared to become his capital in al-Andalus. As part of this preparation, his two sons and governors, Abu Yaqub Yusuf and Abu Sa'id, ordered that the city and its monuments be restored. The architect Ahmad ibn Baso (who was later known for his work on the Great Mosque of Seville) was responsible for carrying out this restoration program. It is not known exactly which buildings he restored, but it is almost certain that he restored the Great Mosque. It is likely that the mosque's minbar was also restored at this time, since it is known to have survived long afterwards up to the 16th century.

=== Reconquista and conversion to cathedral (13th century) ===
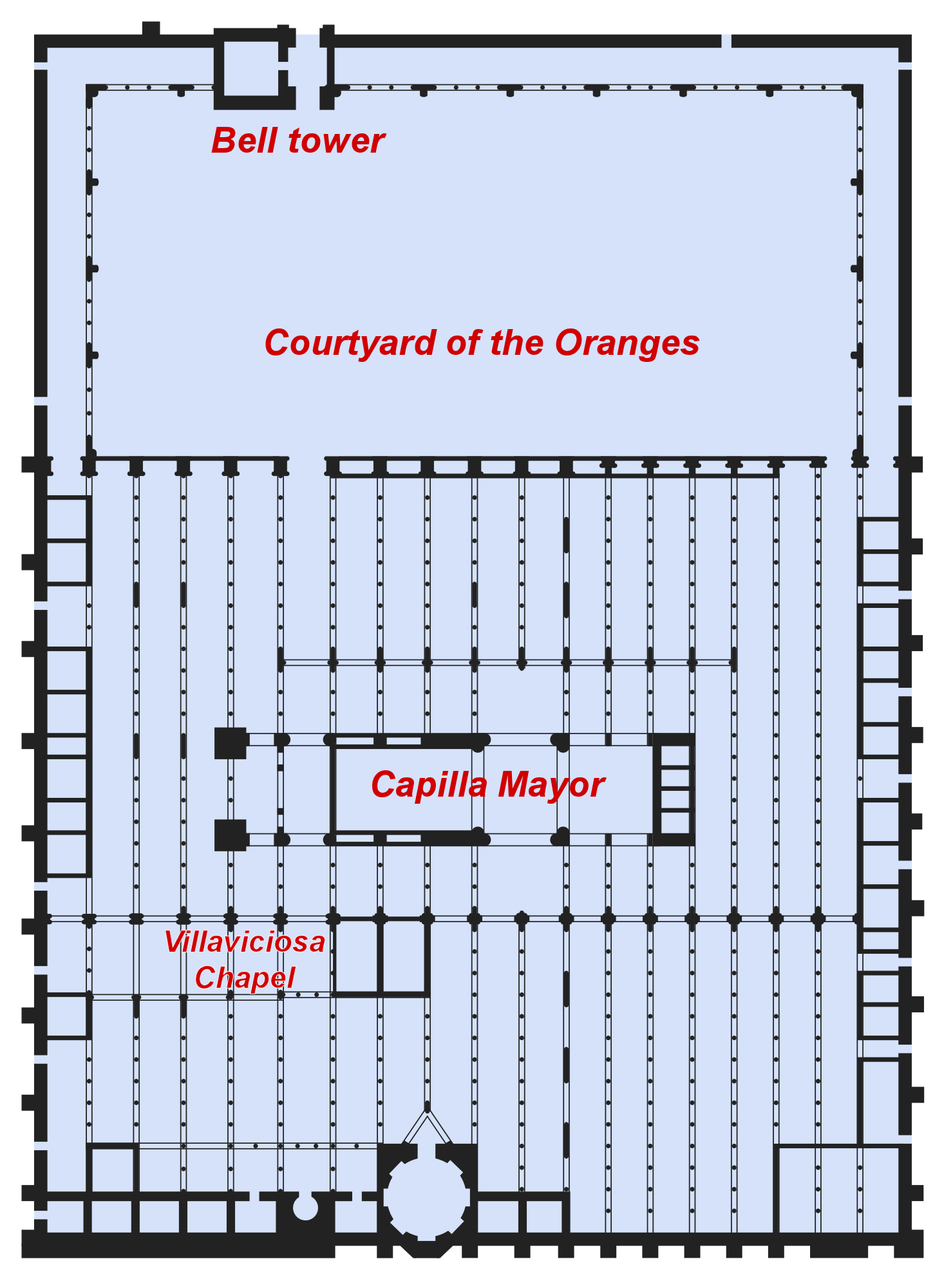
Floor plan of the cathedral-mosque today, following multiple additions in the Christian era of the building. Most notably, the current Capilla Mayor (center) was added in the 16th century.

In 1236 Córdoba was conquered by King Ferdinand III of Castile as part of the Reconquista. Upon the city's conquest the mosque was converted into a Catholic cathedral dedicated to the Virgin Mary (Santa Maria). The first mass was dedicated here on June 29 of that year. According to Jiménez de Rada, Ferdinand III also carried out the symbolic act of returning the former cathedral bells of Santiago de Compostela that were looted by Al-Mansur (and which had been turned into mosque lamps) back to Santiago de Compostela.

Despite the conversion, the early Christian history of the building saw only minor alterations being done to its structure, mostly limited to the creation of small chapels and the addition of new Christian tombs and furnishings. Even the mosque's minbar was apparently preserved in its original storage chamber, though it is unknown if it was used in any way during this time. (The minbar has since disappeared, but it still existed in the 16th century, when it was apparently seen by Ambrosio de Morales.)

The cathedral's first altar was installed in 1236 under the large ribbed dome at the edge of Al-Hakam II's 10th-century extension of the mosque, becoming part of what is today called the Villaviciosa Chapel (Capilla de Villaviciosa) and the cathedral's first main chapel (the Antigua Capilla Mayor). There is no indication that even this space was significantly modified in its structure at this time. The area of the mosque's mihrab and maqsura, along the south wall, was converted into the Chapel of San Pedro and was reportedly where the host was stored. What is today the 17th-century Chapel of the Conception (Capilla de Nuestra Señora de la Concepción), located on the west wall near the courtyard, was initially the baptistery in the 13th century. These three areas appear to have been the most important focal points of Christian activity in the early cathedral. The minaret of the mosque was also converted directly into a bell tower for the cathedral, with only cosmetic alterations such as the placement of a cross at its summit.

Notably, during the early period of the cathedral-mosque, the workers charged with maintaining the building (which had suffered from disrepair in previous years) were local Muslims (Mudéjars). Some of them were kept on payroll by the church but many of them worked as part of their fulfilment of a "labor tax" on Muslim craftsmen (later extended to Muslims of all professions) which required them to work two days a year on the cathedral building. This tax was imposed by the crown and was unique to the city of Cordoba. It was probably instituted not only to make use of Mudéjar expertise but also to make up for the cathedral chapter's relative poverty, especially vis-à-vis the monumental task of repairing and maintaining such a large building. At the time, Mudéjar craftsmen and carpenters were especially valued across the region and even held monopolies in some Castilian cities such as Burgos.

Other chapels were progressively created around the interior periphery of the building over the following centuries, many of them funerary chapels built through private patronage. The first precisely dated chapel known to be built along the west wall is the Chapel of San Felipe and Santiago, in 1258. The Chapel of San Clemente was created in the southeast part of the mosque before 1262. A couple of early Christian features, such as an altar dedicated to San Blas (installed in 1252) and an altar of San Miguel (1255), disappeared in later centuries.

=== Early additions (14th–15th centuries) ===
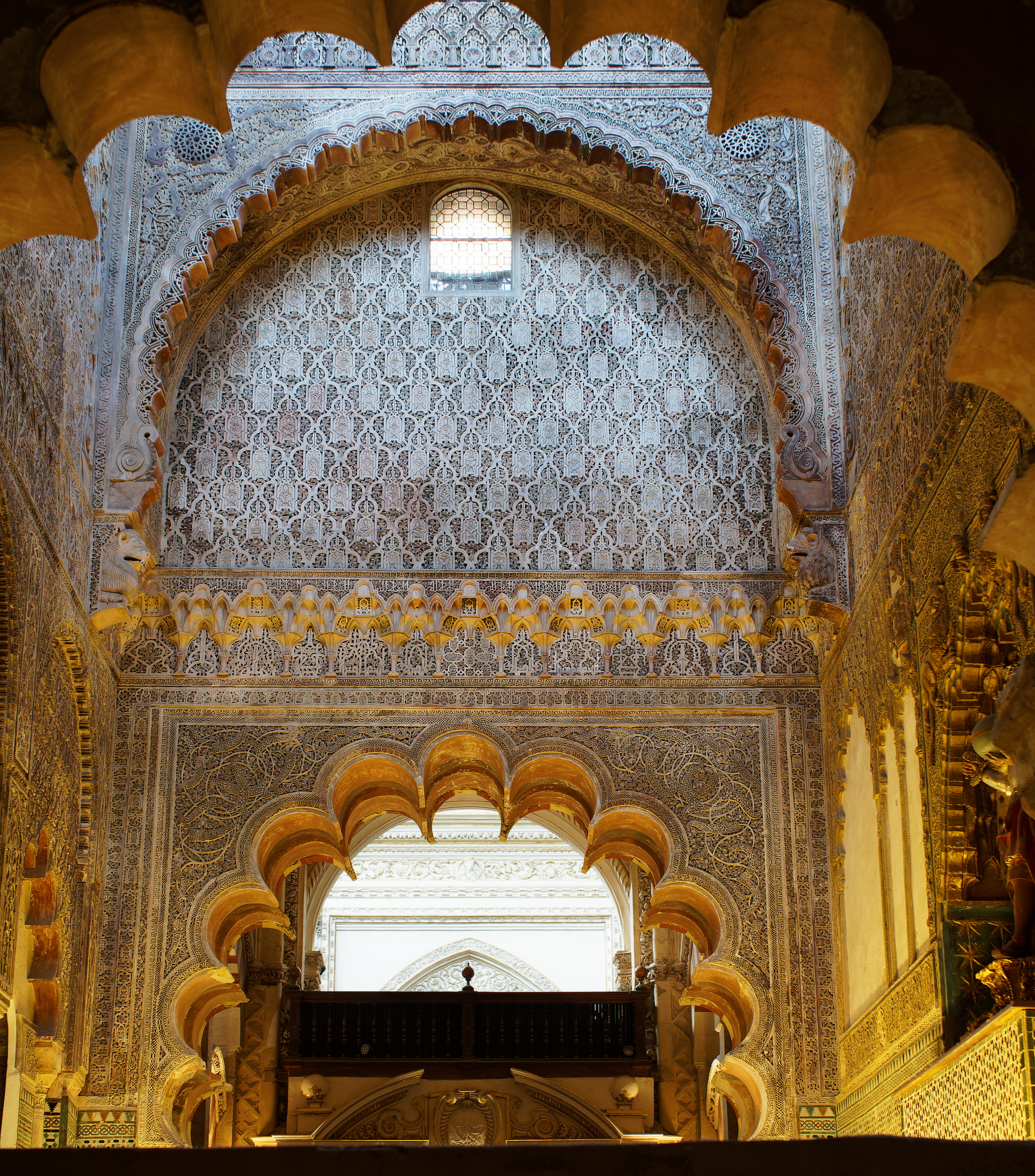
The Mudéjar-style Capilla Real (Royal Chapel), finished in 1371 and once containing the tombs of Ferdinand IV and Alfonso XI

The first major addition to the building under Christian patrons is the Royal Chapel (Capilla Real), located directly behind the west wall of the Villaviciosa Chapel. It was begun at an uncertain date. While it is sometimes believed to have been started by Alfonso X, Heather Ecker has argued that documentary evidence proves it wasn't begun before the 14th century when Constance of Portugal, wife of Ferdinand IV, made an endowment for the chapel. It was finished in 1371 by Enrique II, who moved the remains of his father Alfonso XI and grandfather Ferdinand IV here. (Their remains were later moved in 1736 to the Church of San Hipólito.)

The Royal Chapel was constructed in a lavish Mudéjar style with a ribbed dome very similar to the neighbouring dome of the Villaviciosa Chapel and with surfaces covered in carved stucco decoration typical of Nasrid architecture at the time. This prominent use of the Moorish-Mudéjar style for a royal funerary chapel (along with other examples like the Mudéjar Alcázar of Seville) is interpreted by modern scholars as a desire by the Christian kings to appropriate the prestige of Moorish architecture in the Iberian Peninsula, just as the Mosque of Cordoba was itself a powerful symbol of the former Umayyad Caliphate's political and cultural power which the Castilians were eager to appropriate.

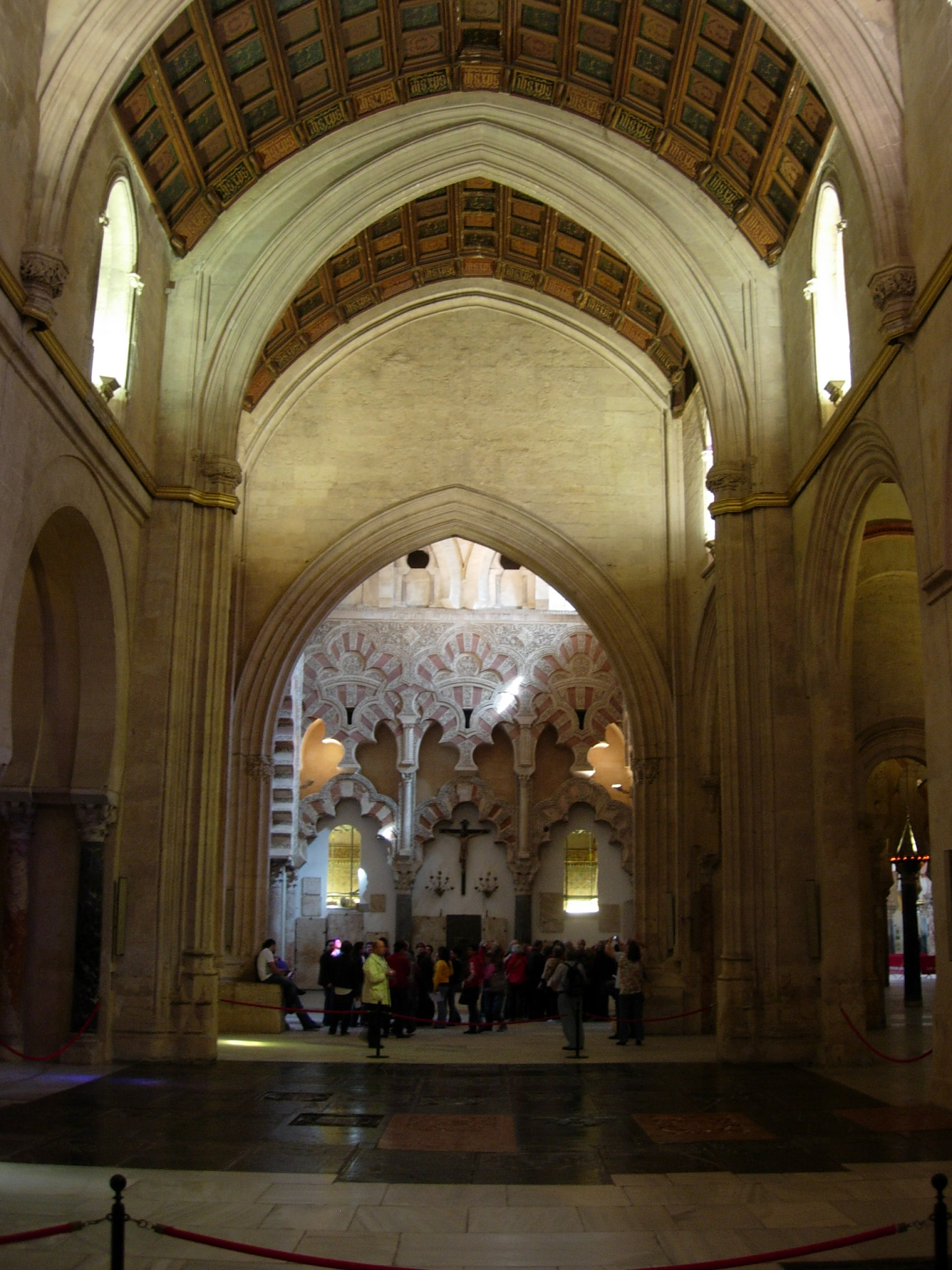
The Gothic nave of the Villaviciosa Chapel, dating from the late 15th century and the former main chapel of the cathedral

In the late 15th century a more significant modification was carried out to the Villaviciosa Chapel, where a new nave in Gothic style was created by clearing some of the mosque arches on the east side of the chapel and adding Gothic arches and vaulting. The nave is dated to 1489 and its construction was overseen by Bishop Íñigo Manrique. It originally had a series of Byzantine-Italian style frescoes by Alonso Martinez depicting saints and kings, but only one of these frescoes has been preserved to the present day and is now being kept at the Museum of Fine Arts in Cordoba.

=== Major alterations (16th–18th centuries) ===
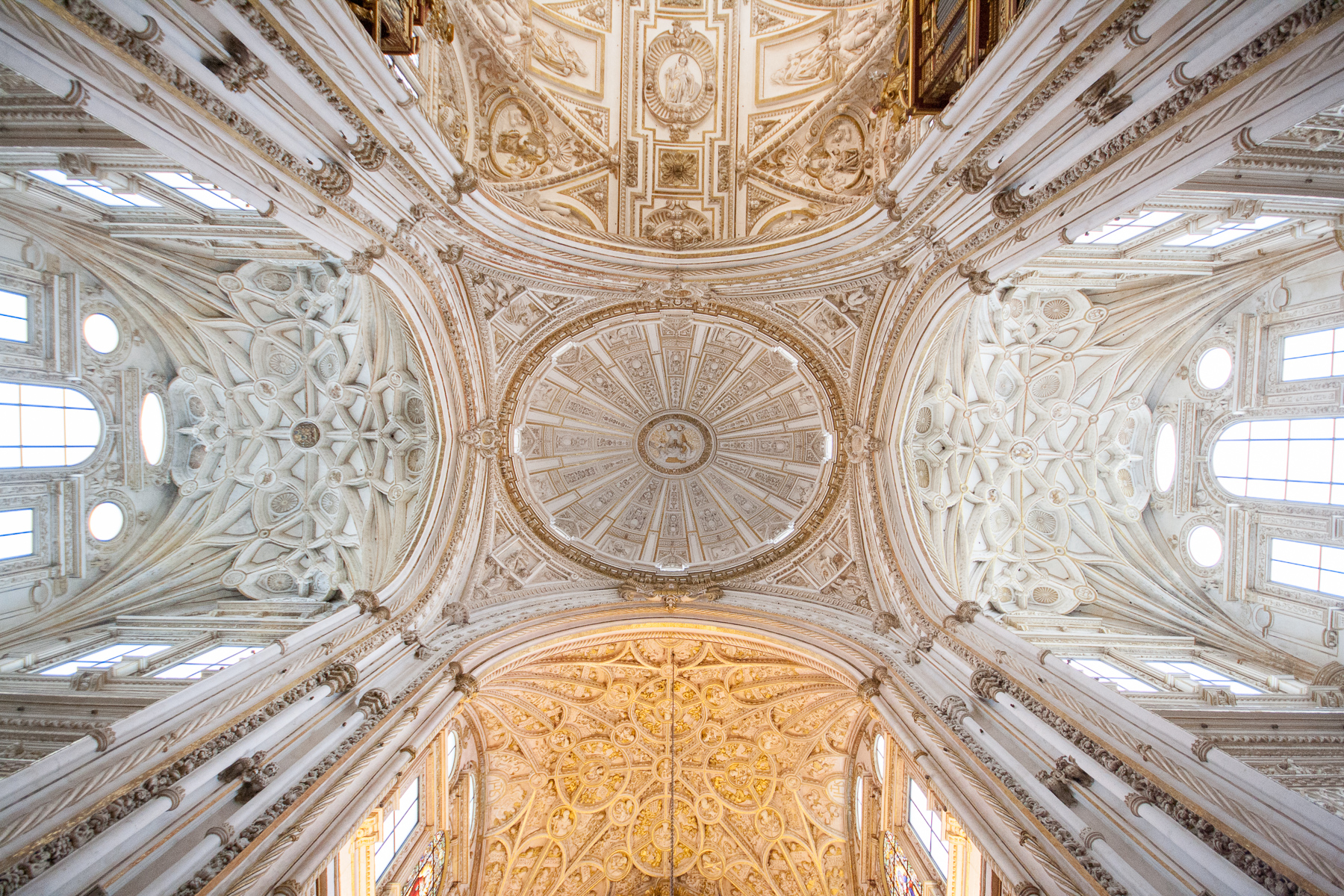
The ceilings of the Renaissance nave and transept, completed by Juan de Ochoa in 1607

The most significant alteration of all, however, was the building of a Renaissance cathedral nave and transept – forming a new Capilla Mayor – in the middle of the expansive mosque structure, starting in 1523. The project, initiated by Bishop Alonso de Manrique, was vigorously opposed by the city council of Cordoba. The cathedral chapter eventually won its case by petitioning Charles V, king of Castile and Aragon, who gave his permission for the project to proceed. When Charles V later saw the result of the construction he is reputed to have been displeased, however, and is claimed to have commented: "You have built what you or anyone else might have built anywhere; to do so you have destroyed something that was unique in the world." (Note: The exact wording or translation of this quote varies between sources. A common shorter version is: "You have destroyed something unique to build something commonplace!")

The architect Hernan Ruiz I was put in charge of the design of the new nave and transept. Before his death in 1547 he built the choir walls up to the windows and the gothic vaults on the south side. He also worked on the mosque building's eastern section (the extension added by Al-Mansur) by adding gothic vaulting to the mosque naves in this area. His son, Hernan Ruiz II "the Younger", took over the project after his death. He was responsible for building the transept walls to their full height as well as the buttresses upholding the structure. After him, the project was entrusted to architect Juan de Ochoa, who completed the project in a Mannerist style. The final element was the construction of the elliptical central dome of the transept, built between 1599 and 1607.

After the completion of Juan de Ochoa's work, Bishop Diego de Mardones initiated the construction of the main altarpiece and provided a significant donation himself for the project. The altarpiece was designed in a Mannerist style by Alonso Matías and construction began in 1618. Other artists who were involved in its execution included Sebastián Vidal, Pedro Freile de Guevara, and Antonio Palomino.

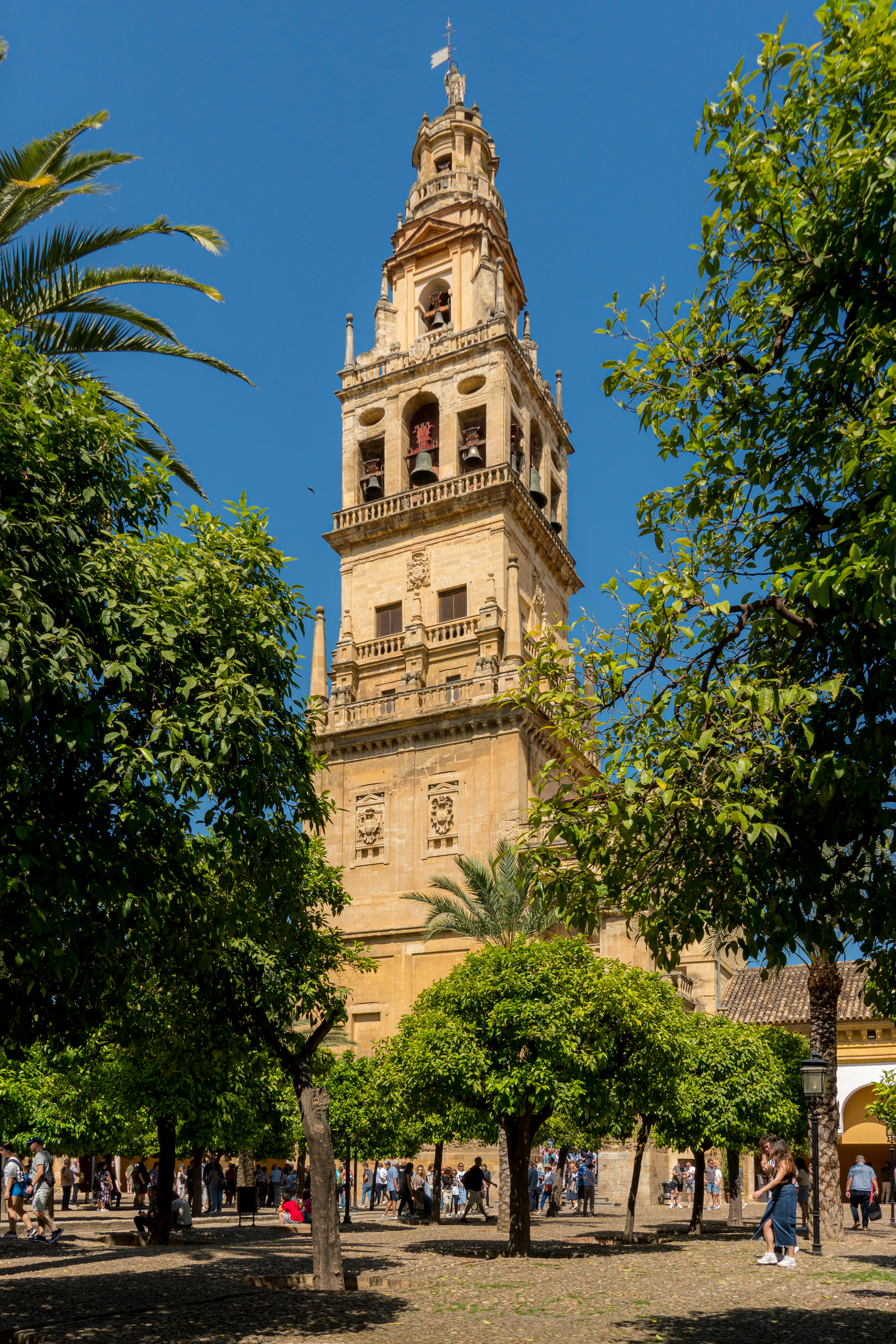
Bell tower as seen from Court of Oranges; the tower encases the remains of the mosque's former minaret

In 1589 a strong storm (or earthquake) caused damage to the former minaret, which was being used as a bell tower, and it was decided to remodel and reinforce the tower. A design by Hernán Ruiz III (son of Hernán Ruiz II) was chosen, encasing the original minaret structure into a new Renaissance-style bell tower. Some of the upper sections of the minaret were demolished in the process. Construction began in 1593 but eventually stalled due to resources being spent instead on the construction of the new cathedral nave and transept happening at the same time. Hernán Ruiz III died in 1606 and was unable to see its completion. The construction resumed under architect Juan Sequero de Matilla in 1616 and the tower was finished in 1617.

The new tower had imperfections, however, and required repairs only a few decades later in the mid-17th century. The cathedral hired architect Gaspar de la Peña to fix the problems. He reinforced the tower and modified the initial design of the Puerta del Perdón ("Door of Forgiveness") which passed through the tower's base. In 1664 Gaspar added a new cupola to the top of the belfry onto which he raised a statue of Saint Raphael made by the sculptors Pedro de la Paz and Bernabé Gómez del Río. In 1727 the tower was damaged by another storm and in 1755 pieces of it (mainly decorative details) were damaged by the 1755 Lisbon Earthquake. A French architect, Baltasar Dreveton, was charged with restoring and repairing the structure over a period of 8 years.

In March 1748 construction on the choir stalls of the Capilla Mayor began, with the commission awarded to Pedro Duque Cornejo. It was initially funded with the help of a large bequest by Archdeacon José Díaz de Recalde in 1742. Work on the choir stalls finished in 1757, though Duque Cornejo – who had worked on it continuously for nearly a decade – died just two weeks before the finished choir was officially opened.

=== Modern restorations (19th–21st centuries) ===
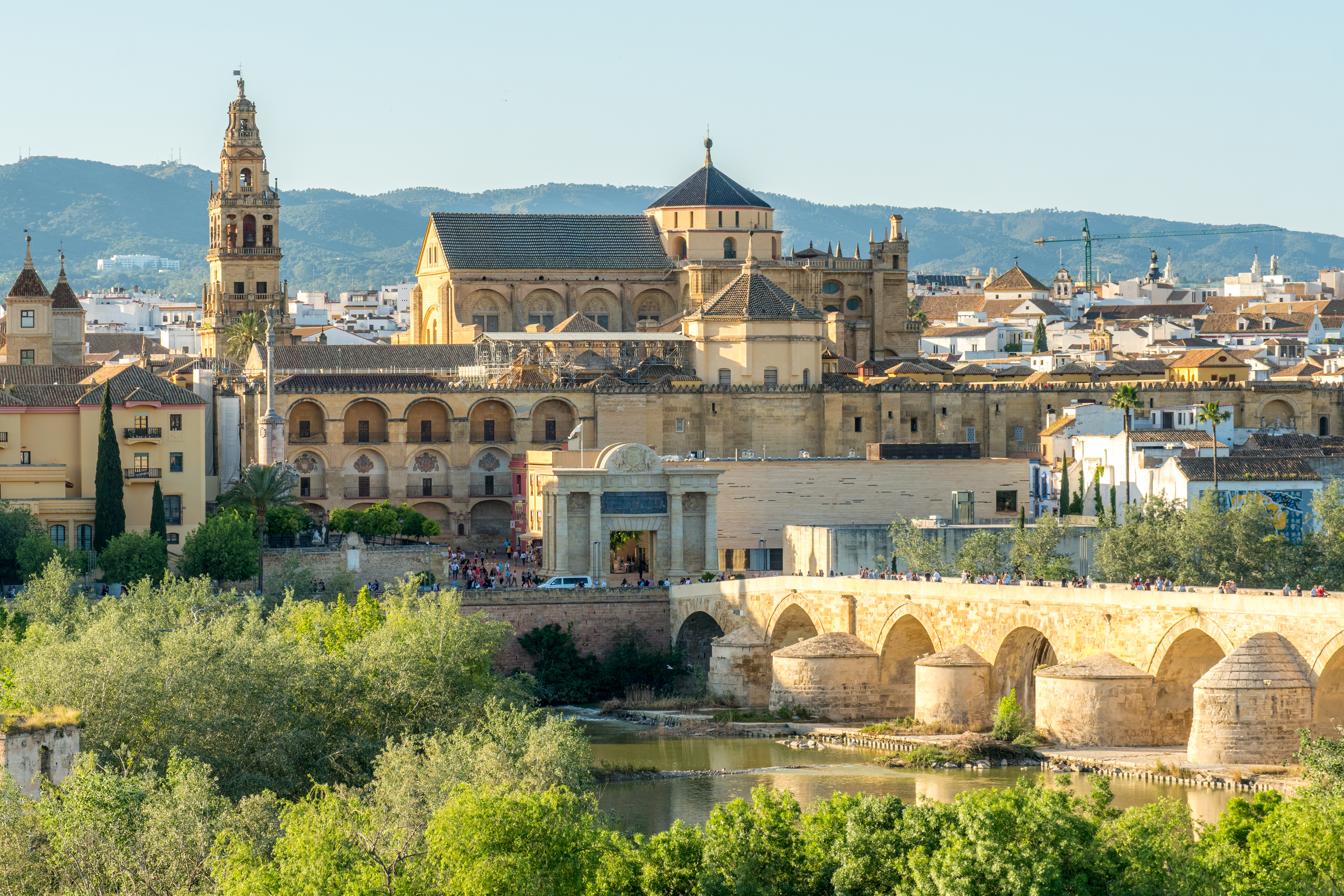
View of the Mosque-Cathedral from the Guadalquivir River

In 1816 the original mihrab of the mosque was uncovered from behind the former altar of the old Chapel of San Pedro. Patricio Furriel was responsible for restoring the mihrab's Islamic mosaics, including the portions which had been lost. Further restoration works concentrating on the former mosque structure were carried out between 1879 and 1923 under the direction of Velázquez Bosco, who among other things dismantled the baroque elements that had been added to the Villaviciosa Chapel and uncovered the earlier structures there. During this period, in 1882, the cathedral and mosque structure was declared a National Monument. Further research work and archaeological excavations were carried out on the mosque structure and in the Courtyard of the Oranges by Félix Hernández between 1931 and 1936. More recent scholars have noted that modern restorations since the 19th century have partly focused on "re-islamicizing" (in architectural terms) parts of the Mosque-Cathedral. This took place in the context of wider conservation efforts in Spain, starting in the 19th century, towards studying and restoring Islamic-era structures.

The Mosque-Cathedral was declared a UNESCO World Heritage Site in 1984, and in 1994 this status was extended to the entire historic centre of Cordoba. A restoration project began on the bell tower in 1991 and finished in 2014, while the transept and choir of the Renaissance cathedral were also restored between 2006 and 2009. Further restorations of features like chapels and some of the outer gates have continued to take place up to the late 2010s.

On 8 August 2025, a fire broke out at 9:10 p.m. in a chapel used as a warehouse in the Almanzor extension. The flames reached the Chapel of Expectation, and after the firefighters intervened, the roof of this chapel collapsed under the weight of the water. In September 2025, authorities announced a comprehensive restoration project to repair the damage, which was projected to last until mid-2026.

== Architecture ==
The Great Mosque of Córdoba held a place of importance amongst the Islamic community of al-Andalus for centuries. In Córdoba, the Umayyad capital, the Mosque was seen as the heart and central focus of the city. To the people of al-Andalus "the beauty of the mosque was so dazzling that it defied any description."

After all of its historical expansions, the mosque-cathedral covers an area of 590 by 425 feet (180 m × 130 m). The building's original floor plan follows the overall form of some of the earliest mosques built from the very beginning of Islam. Some of its features had precedents in the Umayyad Mosque of Damascus, which was an important model built before it. It had a rectangular prayer hall with aisles arranged perpendicular to the qibla, the direction towards which Muslims pray. It has thick outer walls with a somewhat fortress-like appearance. To the north is a spacious courtyard (the former sahn), surrounded by an arcaded gallery, with gates on the north, west, and east sides, and fountains that replace the former mosque fountains used for ablutions. A bridge or elevated passage (the sabat) once existed on the west side of the mosque which connected the prayer hall directly with the Caliph's palace across the street. Al-Razi, an Arab writer, speaks of the valuable wine-coloured marble, obtained from the mountains of the district, which was much used in embellishing the naves of the mosque.

The Christian-era additions (after 1236) included many small chapels throughout the building and various relatively cosmetic changes. The most substantial and visible additions are the cruciform nave and transept of the Capilla Mayor (the main chapel where Mass is held today) which were begun in the 16th century and inserted into the middle of the former mosque's prayer hall, as well as the remodelling of the former minaret into a Renaissance-style bell tower.

=== The hypostyle hall ===
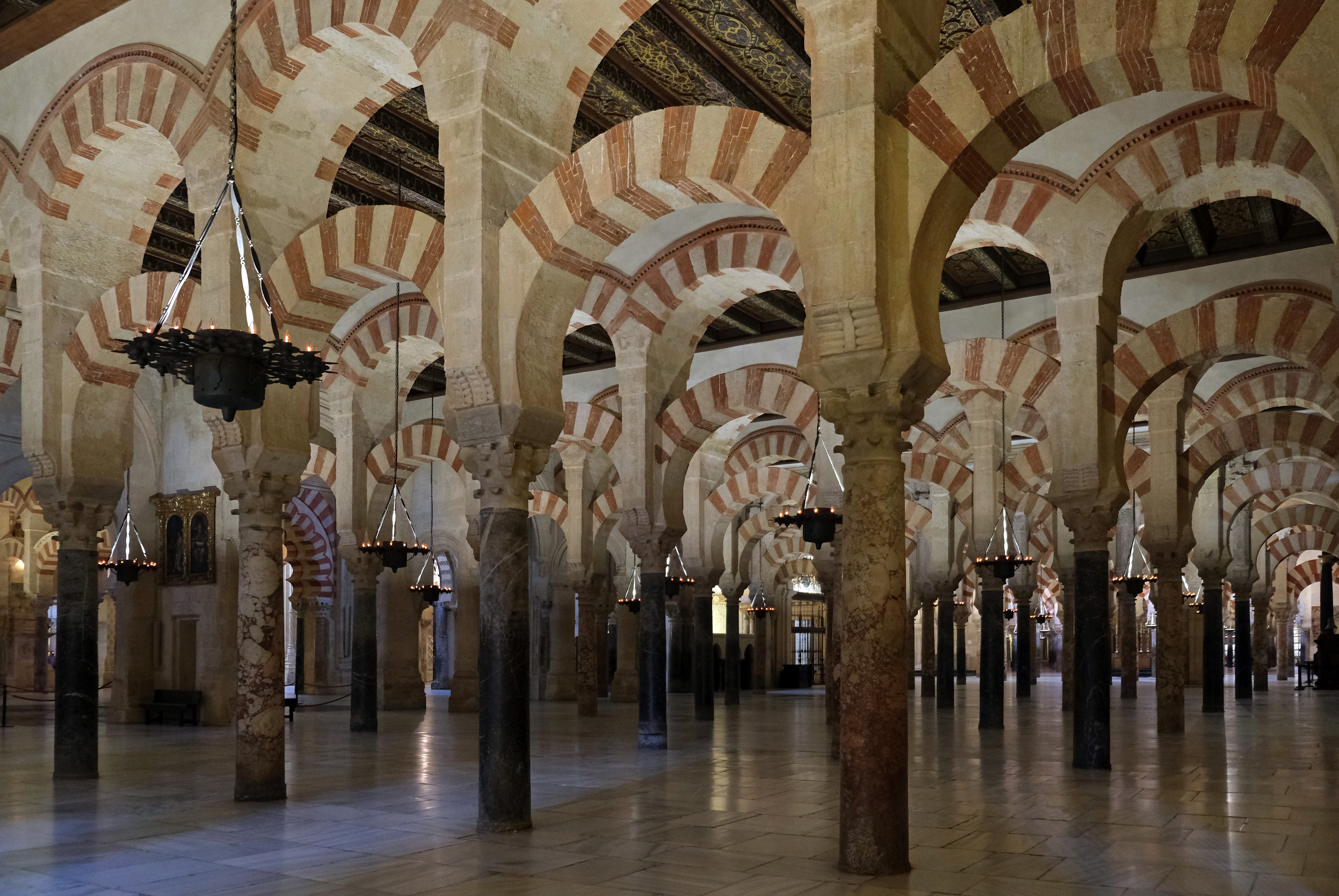
Hypostyle prayer hall

The mosque-cathedral's hypostyle hall dates from the original mosque construction and originally served as its main prayer space for Muslims. The main hall of the mosque was used for a variety of purposes. It served as a central prayer hall for personal devotion, for the five daily Muslim prayers and the special Friday prayers accompanied by a sermon. It also would have served as a hall for teaching and for Sharia law cases during the rule of Abd al-Rahman I and his successors.

The hall was large and flat, with timber ceilings held up by rows of two-tiered arches resting on columns. The two-tiered arches consist of a lower tier of horseshoe arches and an upper tier of semi-circular arches.These rows of arches divided the original building into 11 aisles or "naves" running from north to south, later increased to 19 by Al-Mansur's expansion, while in turn forming perpendicular aisles running east–west between the columns. The nave that leads to the mihrab – which was originally the central nave of the mosque until Al-Mansur's lateral expansion of the building altered its symmetry – is slightly wider than the other naves, demonstrating a subtle hierarchy in the mosque's floor plan.

The original mosque had some 120 columns All of the original columns and capitals were reused from earlier Roman and Visigothic buildings, but subsequent expansions (starting with Abd al-Rahman II) saw the incorporation of new Moorish-made capitals that evolved from earlier Roman models. The current building has approximately 850 columns made of jasper, onyx, marble, granite and porphyry.

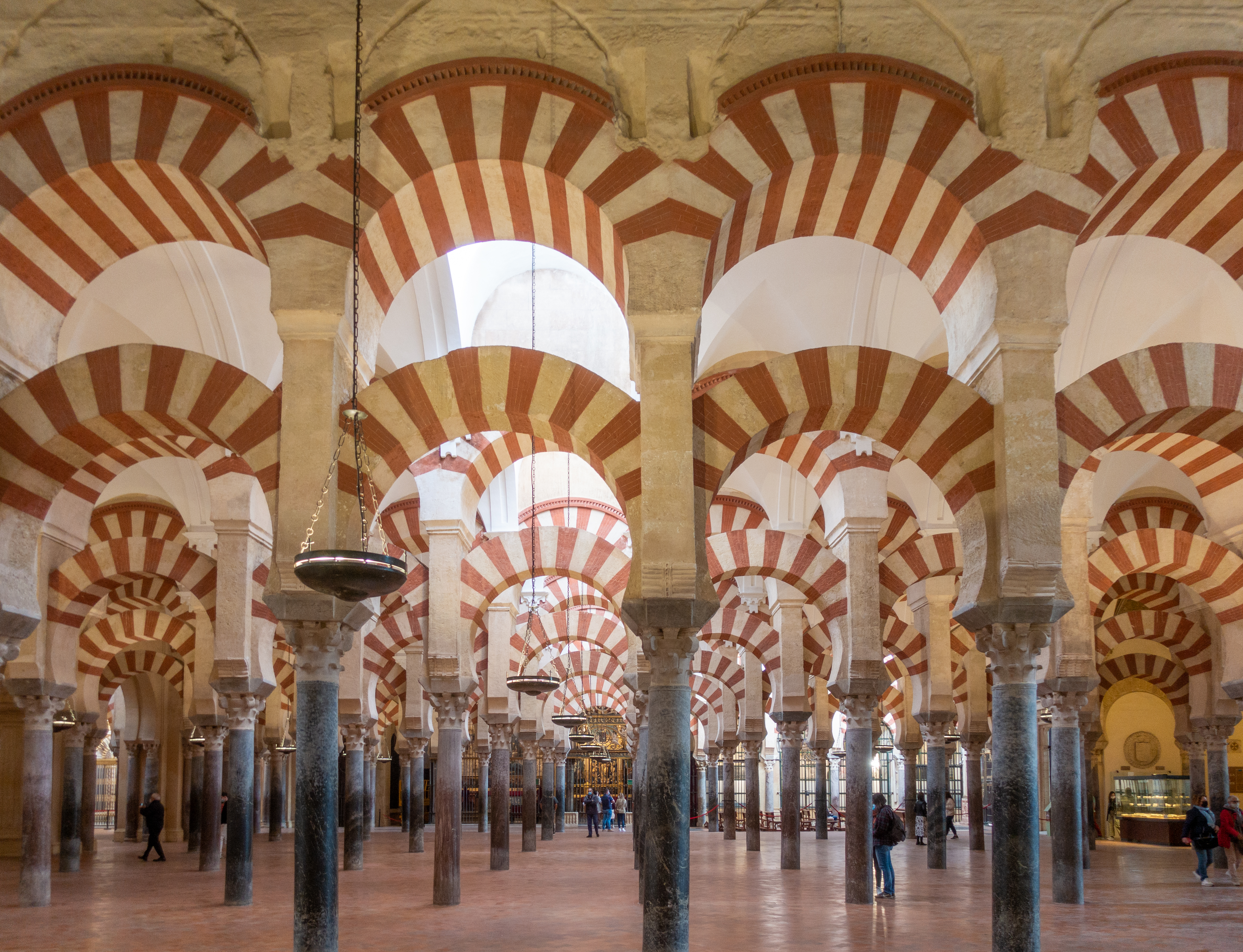
The two-tiered arches of the hypostyle hall

The mosque's architectural system of repeating two-tiered arches, with otherwise little surface decoration, is considered one of its most innovative characteristics and has been the subject of much commentary. The hypostyle hall has been variously described as resembling a "forest of columns" and having an effect similar to a "hall of mirrors". Scholar Jerrilynn Dodds has further summarized the visual effect of the hypostyle hall with the following:

Interest in the mosque's interior is created, then, not by the application of a skin of decoration to a separately conceived building but by the transformation of the morphemes of the architecture itself: the arches and voussoirs. Because we share the belief that architectural components must by definition behave logically, their conversion into agents of chaos fuels a basic subversion of our expectations concerning the nature of architecture. The tensions that grow from these subverted expectations create an intellectual dialogue between building and viewer that will characterize the evolving design of the Great Mosque of Cordoba for over two hundred years.

Much speculation has been offered on the inspiration for the arch design, often focusing on the possible influence of Umayyad architecture in the Levant, the homeland of Abd ar-Rahman I, where two-tiered arches were used in a simpler form. It is sometimes suggested that the design of the arches was meant to evoke a forest of palm trees from Abd ar-Rahman's youth in Syria. The motivation for the two-tiered design may have been more technical: unlike the large spolia columns available in Damascus, the columns available for reuse in Córdoba were not tall enough to raise the ceiling to the desired height on their own, so the addition of a second tier of arches above the first tier was an innovative way to resolve this. The precedent of multi-tiered arches was also present in the Iberian Peninsula thanks to remaining Roman aqueducts (e.g. the Milagros Aqueduct at Mérida); therefore, these local influences may have been more significant.

The voussoirs of the arches alternate between red brick and white stone. Colour alternations like this were also common in Umayyad architecture in the Levant and in pre-Islamic architecture on the Iberian Peninsula. According to Anwar G. Chejne, the arches were inspired by those in the Dome of the Rock. Horseshoe arches were known in the Iberian Peninsula in the Visigothic period (e.g. the 7th-century Church of San Juan de Baños) and to a lesser extent in Byzantine and Umayyad regions of the Middle East. The traditional "Moorish" arch in al-Andalus developed into its own distinctive and slightly more sophisticated version.

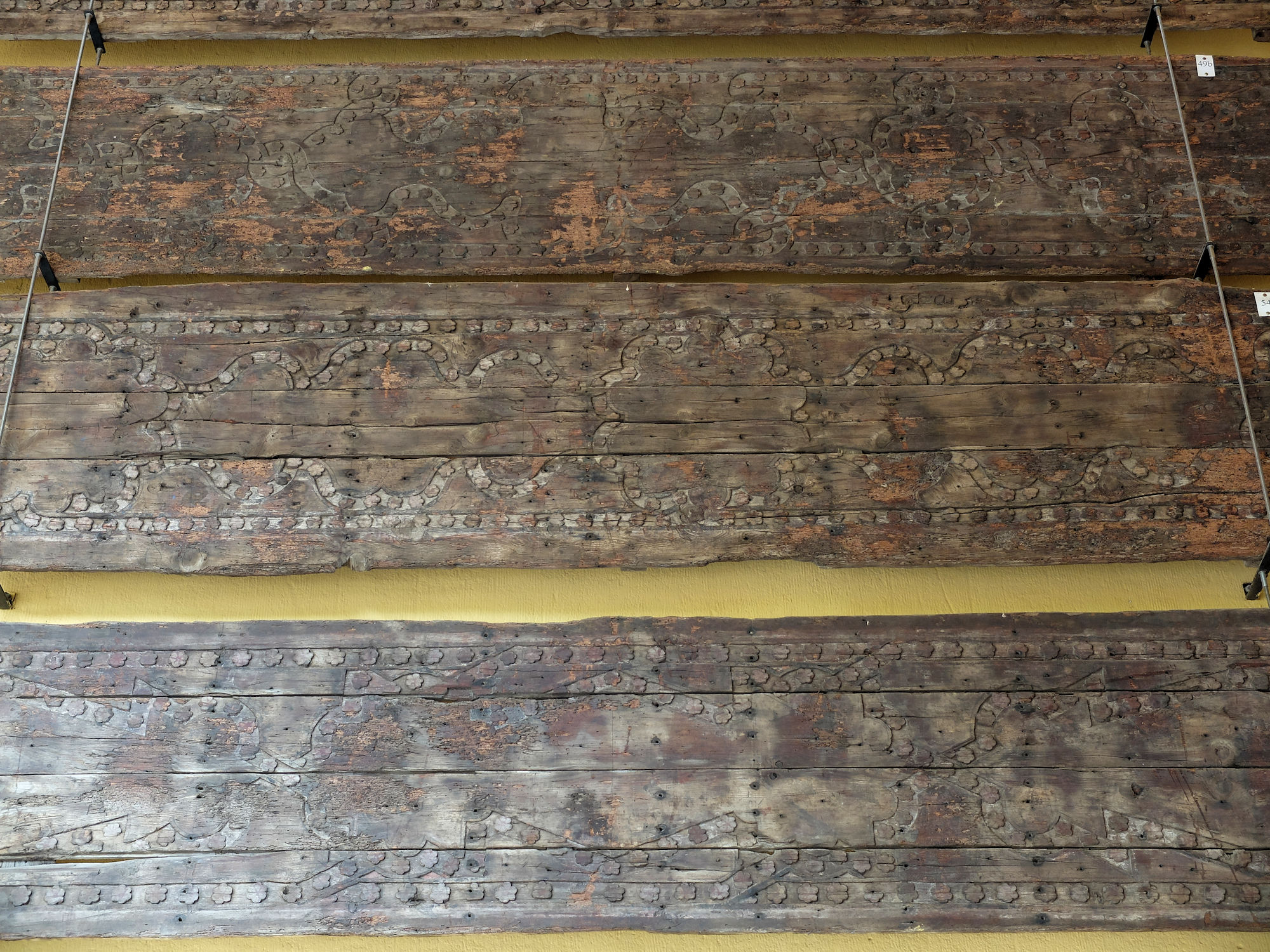
Fragments of the original mosque ceiling (on display in the courtyard today)

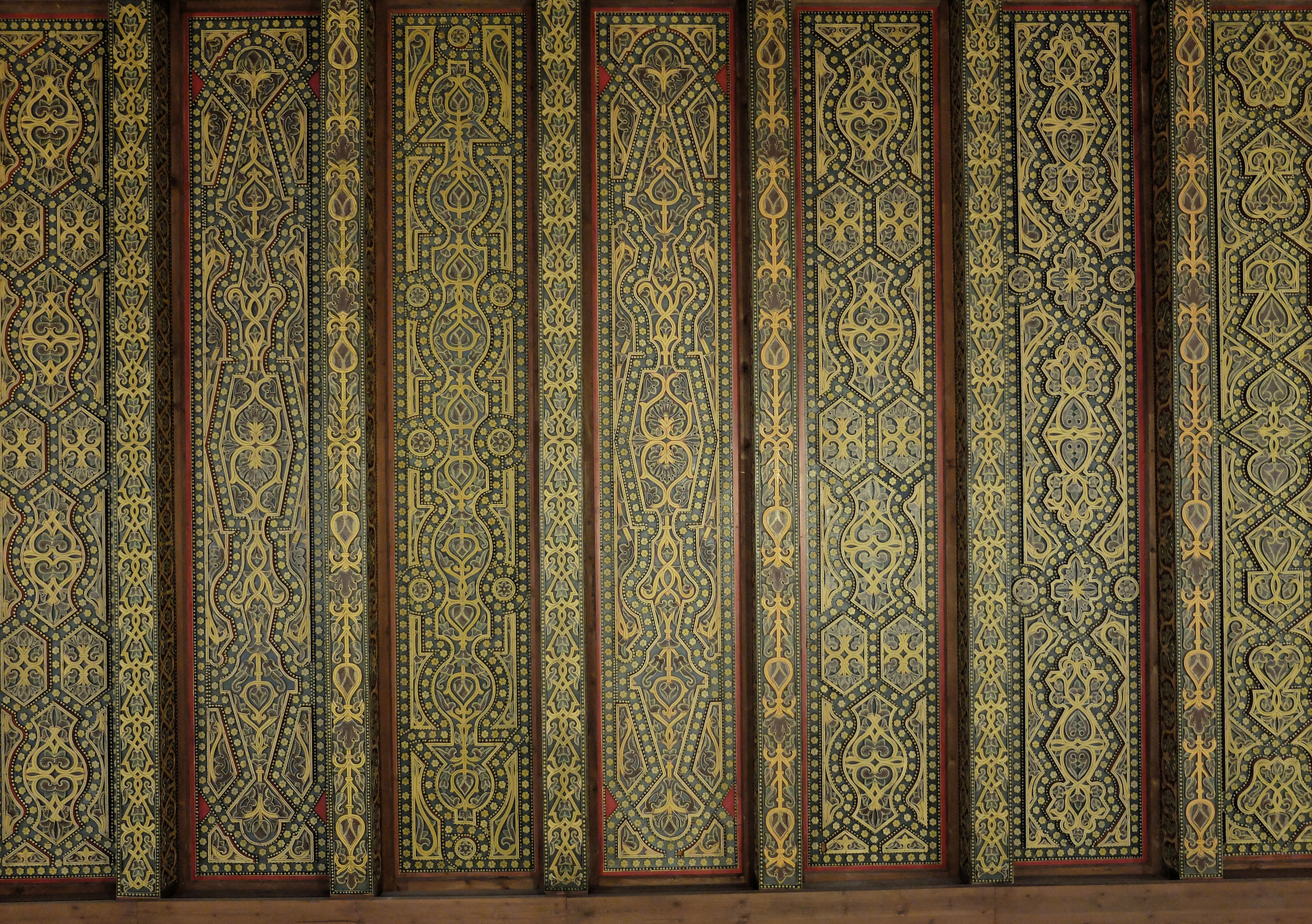
Reconstructed mosque ceiling, as seen in the southwestern part of the building today

The mosque's original flat wooden ceiling was made of wooden planks and beams with carved and painted decoration. Preserved fragments of the original ceiling – some of which are now on display in the Courtyard of the Oranges – were discovered in the 19th century and have allowed modern restorers to reconstruct the ceilings of some of the western sections of the mosque according to their original style. The eastern naves of the hall (in al-Mansur's expansion), by contrast, are now covered by high Gothic vaults which were added in the 16th century by Hernan Ruiz I. On the exterior, the building has gabled roofs covered in tiles.

==== Dome of the Villaviciosa Chapel ====
In the nave or aisle of the hypostyle hall which leads to the mihrab, at the spot which marks the beginning of Al-Hakam's 10th-century extension, is a monumental ribbed dome with ornate decoration. The ribs of this dome have a different configuration than those of the domes in front of the mihrab. Their intersection creates a square space in the center with an octagonal scalloped cupola added over this. In total, this intersection of ribs creates 17 vaulted compartments of square or triangular shape, in different sizes, each further decorated with a variety of miniature ribbed domes, star-shaped mini-domes, and scalloped shapes.

The space under this dome was surrounded on three sides by elaborate screens of interlacing polylobed arches, similar to those of the maqsura to the south but even more intricate. This architectural ensemble apparently marked the transition from the old mosque to Al-Hakam II's expansion, which some scholars see as having a status similar to a "mosque-within-a-mosque".

The dome is now part of the Villaviciosa Chapel and two of the three intersecting arch screens are still present (the western one has disappeared and been replaced by the 15th-century Gothic nave added to the chapel). Both the ribbed dome and the intersecting arches, along with the domes and arches of the maqsura, were influential in subsequent Moorish architecture, re-appearing in simpler but imaginative forms in the small Bab al-Mardum Mosque in Toledo and giving rise to other ornamental derivations like the later stucco domes of the Great Mosque of Tlemcen and the Great Mosque of Taza.

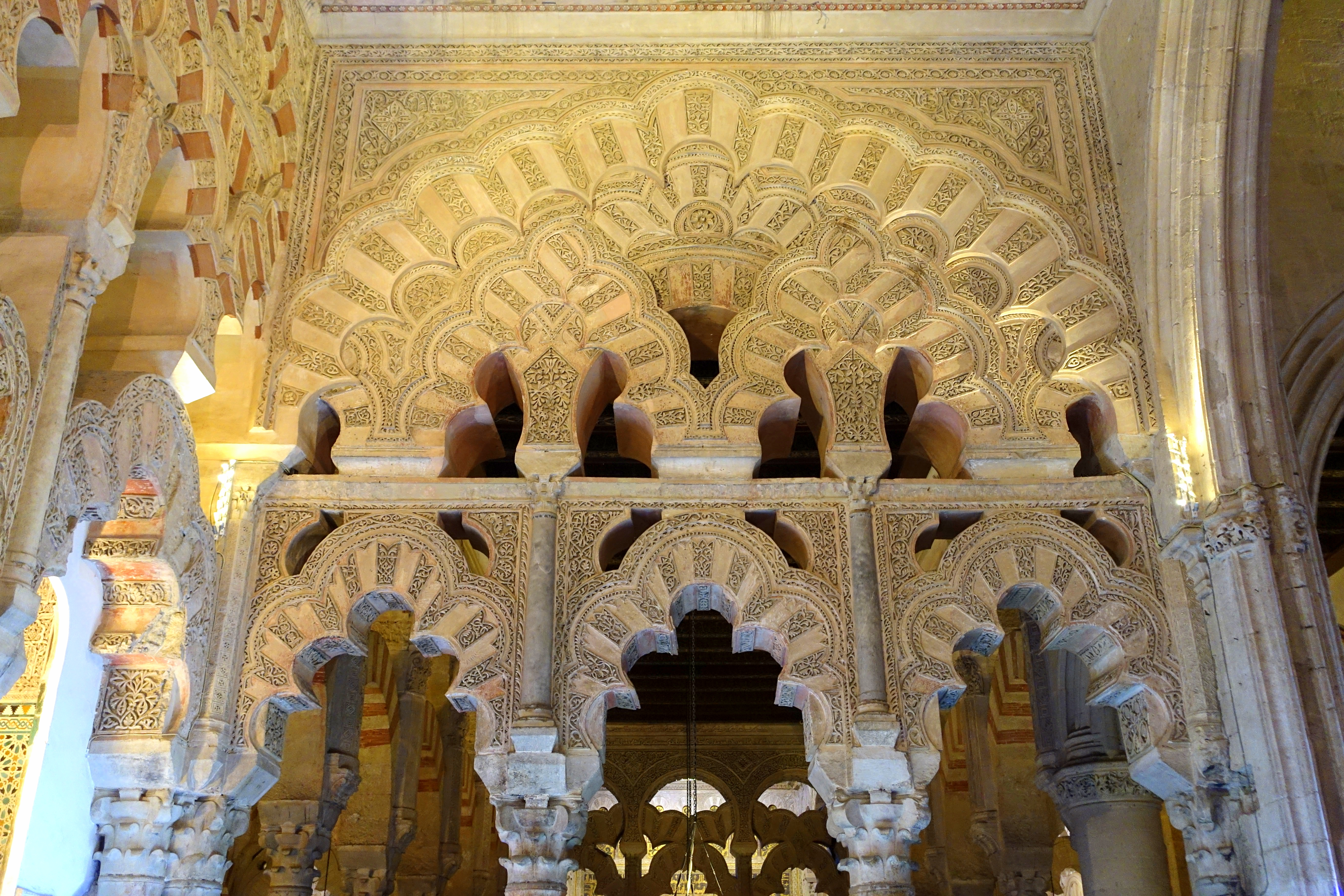
The interlacing arches at the entrance to Al-Hakam II's 10th-century extension (the Villaviciosa Chapel)

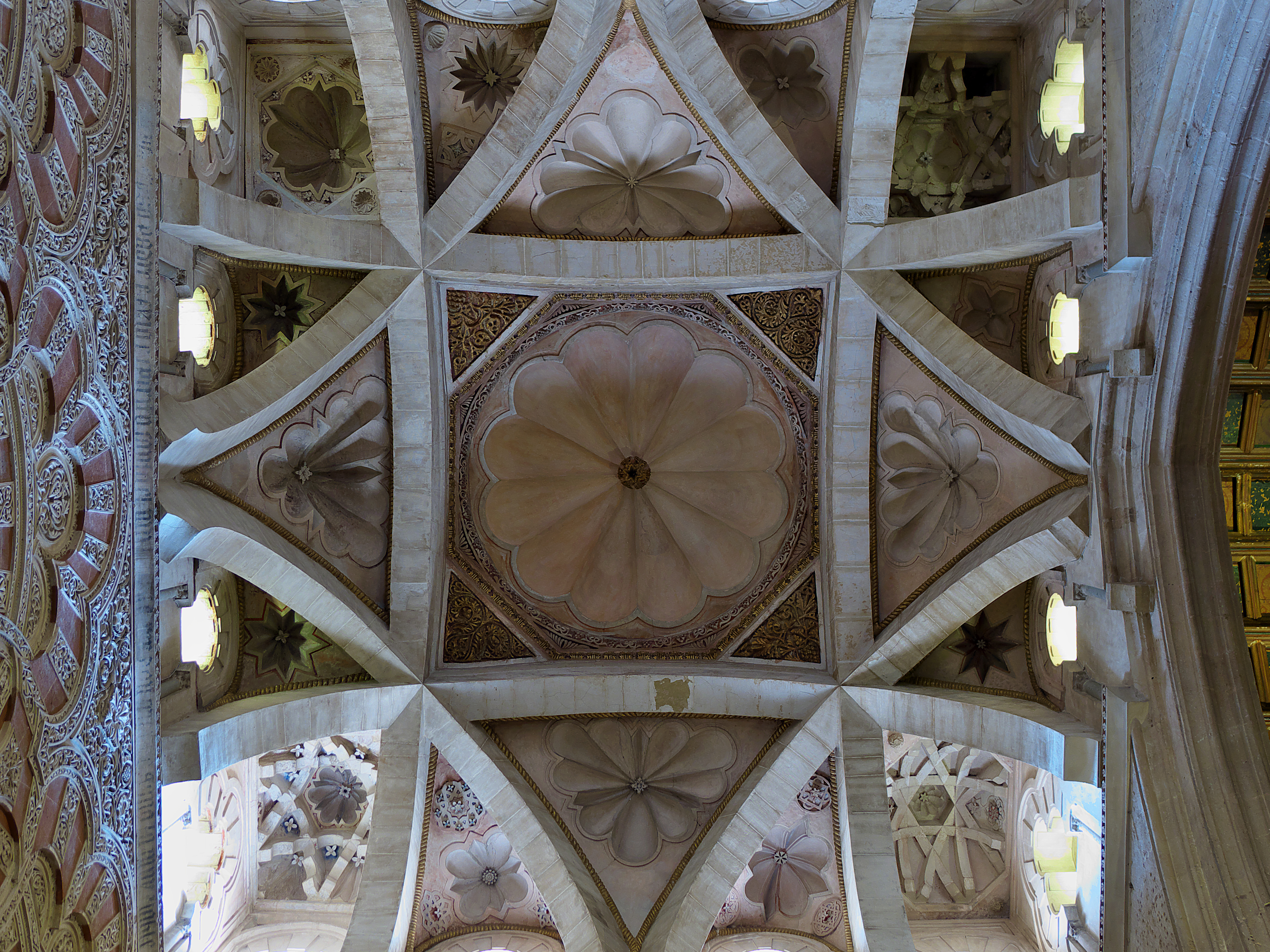
The ribbed dome at the entrance Al-Hakam II's 10th-century extension (the Villaviciosa Chapel)

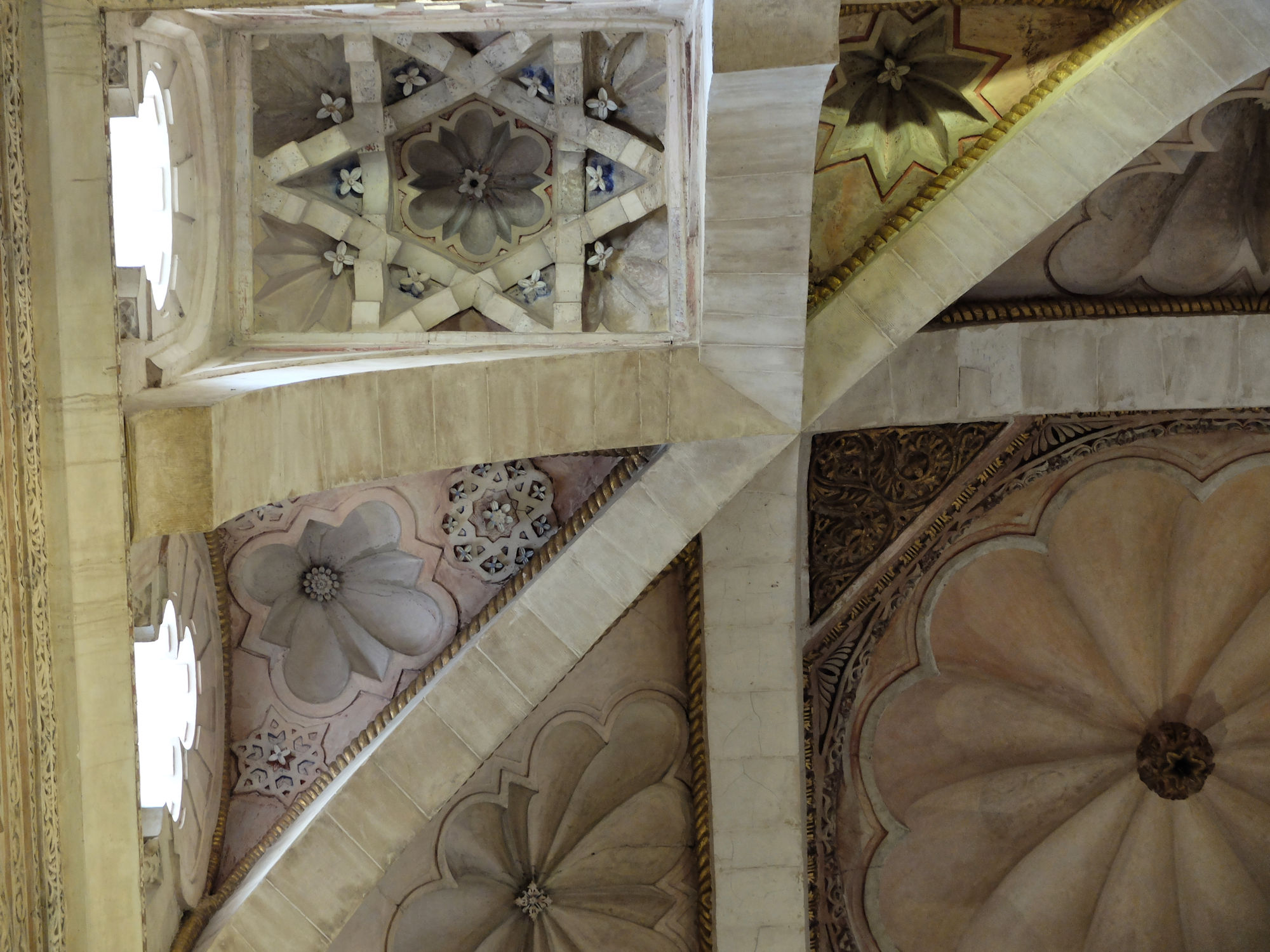
Details of one of the corners of the dome

==== The mihrab and the maqsura ====
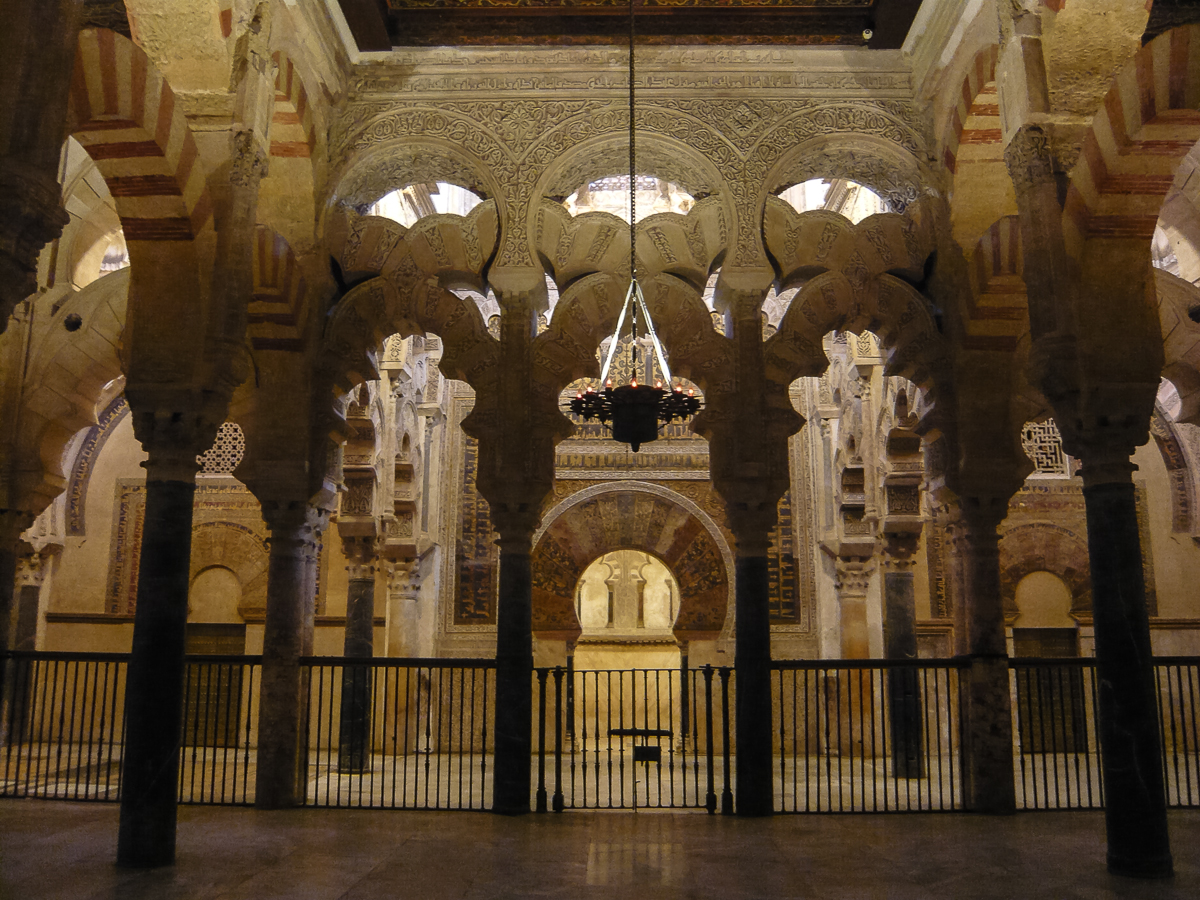
View of the maqsura arches and the mihrab behind it, with the lateral doors on the right and left

At the south end of the prayer hall is a richly decorated mihrab (niche symbolizing the direction of prayer) surrounded by an architecturally defined maqsura (an area reserved for the emir or caliph during prayer), which date from the expansion of Caliph Al-Hakam II after 965. This maqsura area covers three bays along the southern qibla wall in front of the mihrab, and was marked off from the rest of the mosque by an elaborate screen of intersecting horseshoe and polylobed arches; a feature which would go on to be highly influential in the subsequent development of Moorish architecture. The mihrab opens in the wall at the middle of this maqsura, while two doors flank it on either side. The door on the right, Bab al-Sabat ("door of the sabat"), gave access to a passage which originally led to the sabat, an elevated passage over the street which connected the mosque to the caliph's palace. The door on the left, Bab Bayt al-Mal ("door of the treasury"), led to a treasury located behind the qibla wall (now partly occupied by the cathedral's treasury).

The mihrab consists of a horseshoe arch leading to a small heptagonal chamber covered by a shell-shaped cupola above a ring of polylobed blind arches and carvings. This is the earliest known mihrab that consists of an actual room rather than just a niche in the wall. Under the horseshoe arch are two pairs of short marble columns with capitals – each pair featuring one red column and one dark green column – that are believed to have been reused from the mihrab of Abd al-Rahman II's earlier expansion of the mosque. The mihrab is, in turn, surrounded by a typical arrangement of radiating arch decoration and a rectangular framing or alfiz, which is also seen in the design of the earlier western mosque gate of Bab al-Wuzara (the Puerta de San Esteban today) and was likely also present in the design of the mosque's first mihrab. Above this alfiz is another decorative blind arcade of polylobed arches. The lower walls on either side of the mihrab are panelled with marble carved with intricate arabesque vegetal motifs, while the spandrels above the arch are likewise filled with carved arabesques. The voussoirs of the arch, however, as well as the rectangular alfiz frame and the blind arcade above it, are all filled with gold and glass mosaics. Those in the voussoirs and the blind arcade form vegetal and floral motifs, while those in the alfiz and in smaller bands at the springs of the arch contain Arabic inscriptions in Kufic script. The two doors on either side of the mihrab section are also framed by similar, but less elaborate, mosaic decoration.

The three bays of the maqsura area (the space in front of the mihrab and the spaces in front of the two side doors) are each covered by ornate ribbed domes. The use of intersecting arches in this area also solved the problem of creating additional support to bear the weight and thrust of these domes. The domes themselves are built with eight intersecting stone ribs. Rather than meeting in the center of the dome, the ribs intersect one another off-center, forming an eight-pointed star with an octagonal "scalloped" cupola in the center. The middle dome, in front of the mihrab, is especially elaborate and is also covered by mosaic decoration.

Scholars have affirmed that the style of the mosaics in this part of the mosque is heavily influenced by Byzantine mosaics, which corroborates historical accounts of the Caliph requesting expert mosaicists from the Byzantine emperor at the time, who agreed and sent him a master craftsman. Scholars have argued that this use of Byzantine mosaics is also part of a general desire – whether conscious or not – by the Cordoban Umayyads to evoke connections to the early Umayyad Caliphate in the Middle East, in particular to the Great Umayyad Mosque of Damascus, where Byzantine mosaics were a prominent element of the decoration.

Large portions of the original 10th-century mosaics remain intact, but some parts were damaged over time and were restored in the modern era. In particular, some of the lowest portions of the mosaics on the façade of the mihrab and on the Bab al-Sabat date from restorations conducted by Patricio Furriel in 1817–1818, after the dismounting of an altarpiece and other furnishings in front of the mihrab in 1815 had uncovered the original mosaics and revealed the damage to them. Additionally, the entirety of the mosaics on the Bab Bayt al-Mal façade are reproductions dating from 1914 to 1916, when the atelier of J. & H. Maumejean Fréres in Madrid, with the help of Venetian artist F. Morolin, were charged with making facsimiles of the original mosaics, which had been uncovered in 1912 and were also damaged. A new restoration project focused on the maqsura area and its mosaics also began in January 2024, sponsored by the local city council, and was expected to last about three years.

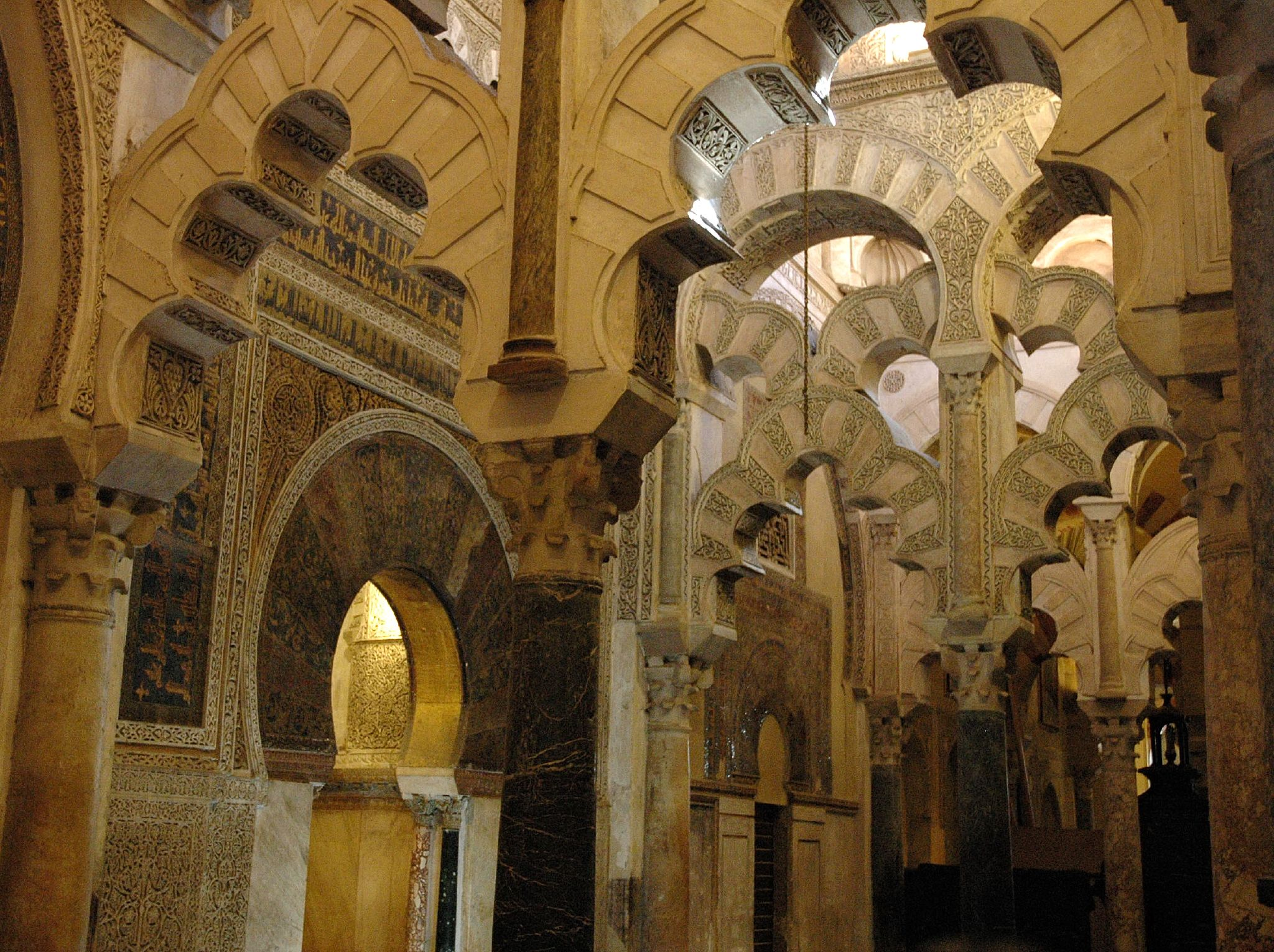
View of the intersecting arches in the maqsura area around the mihrab

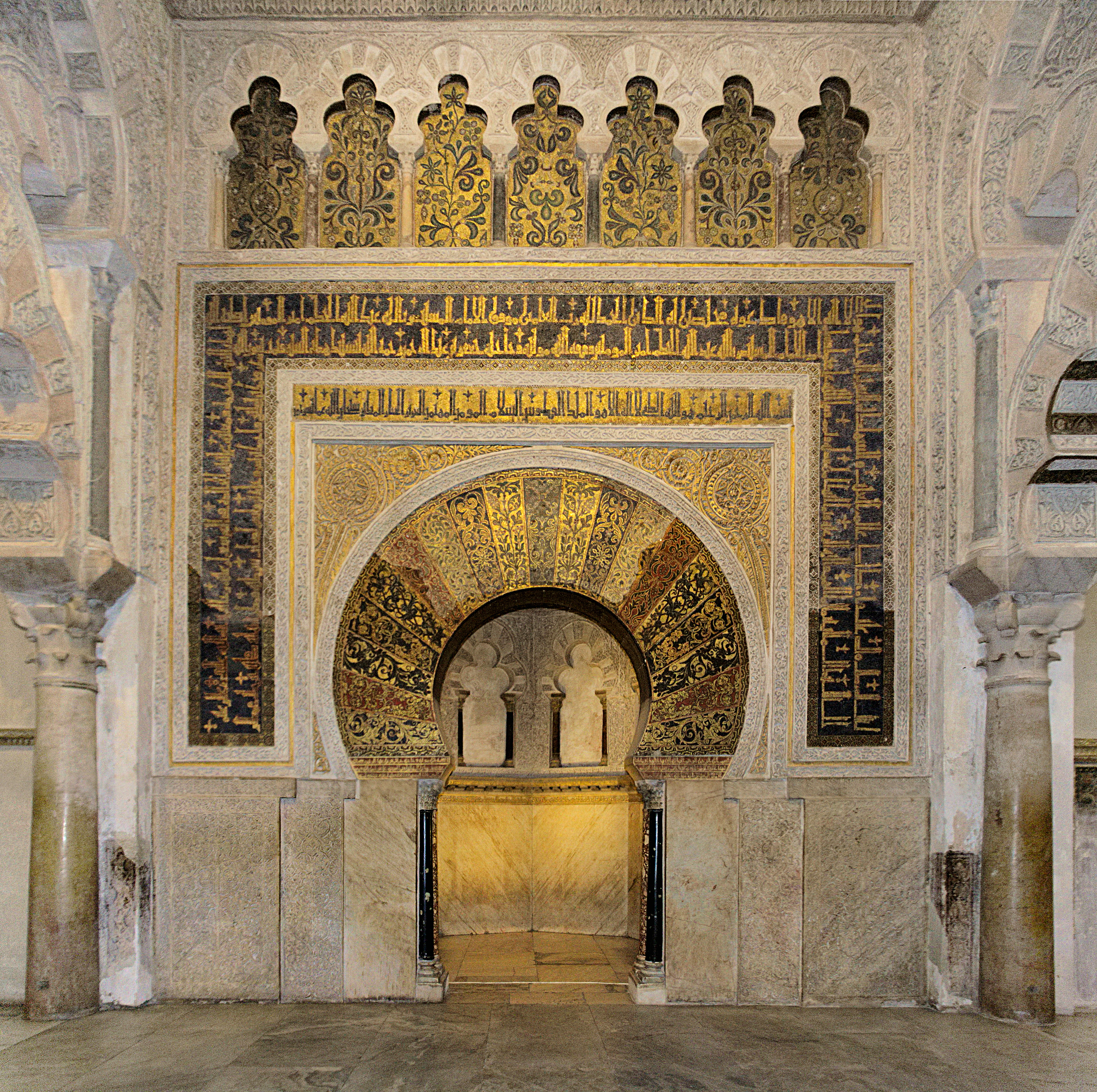
The mihrab

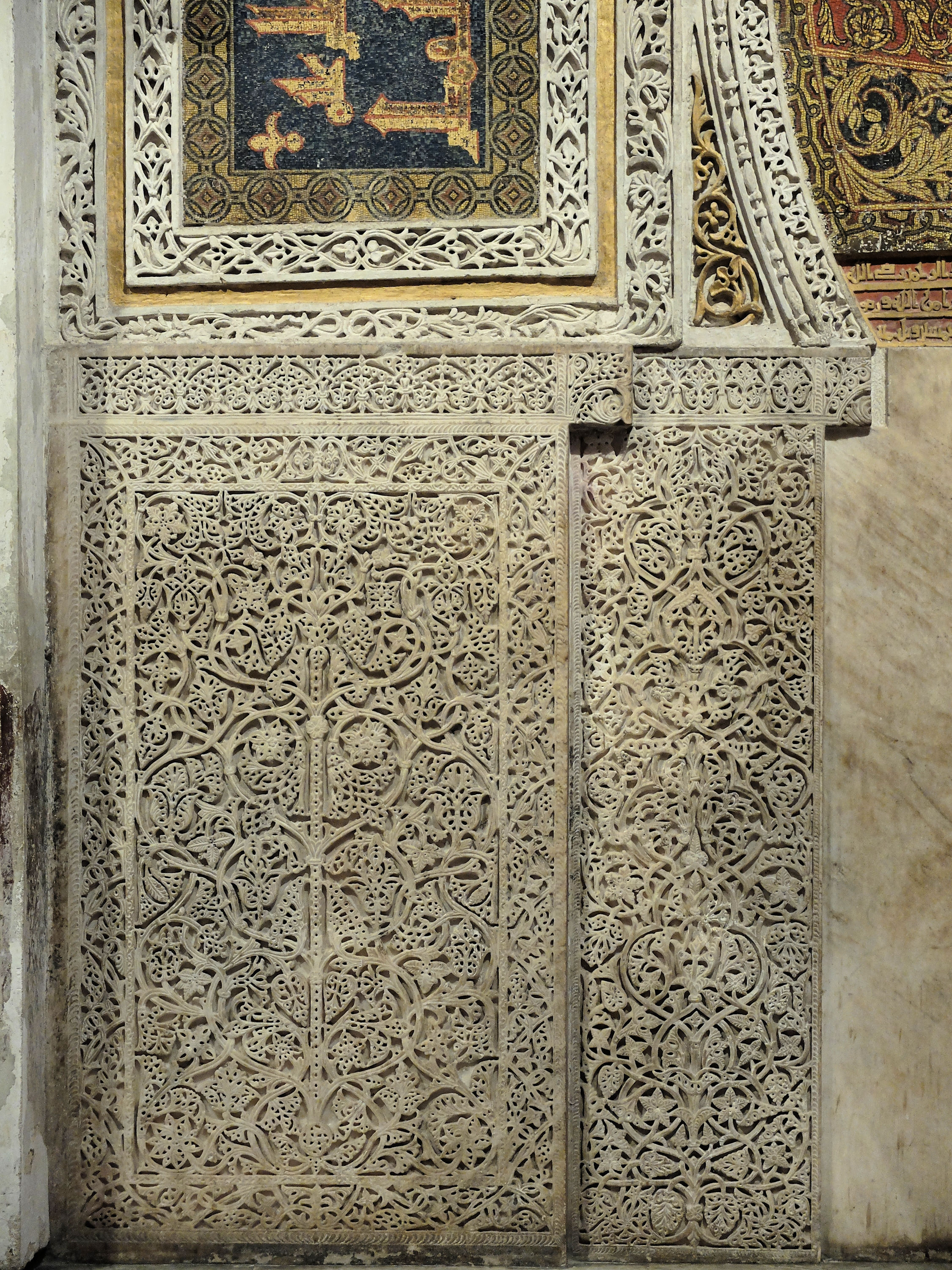
Carved marble decoration on the lower walls around the mihrab

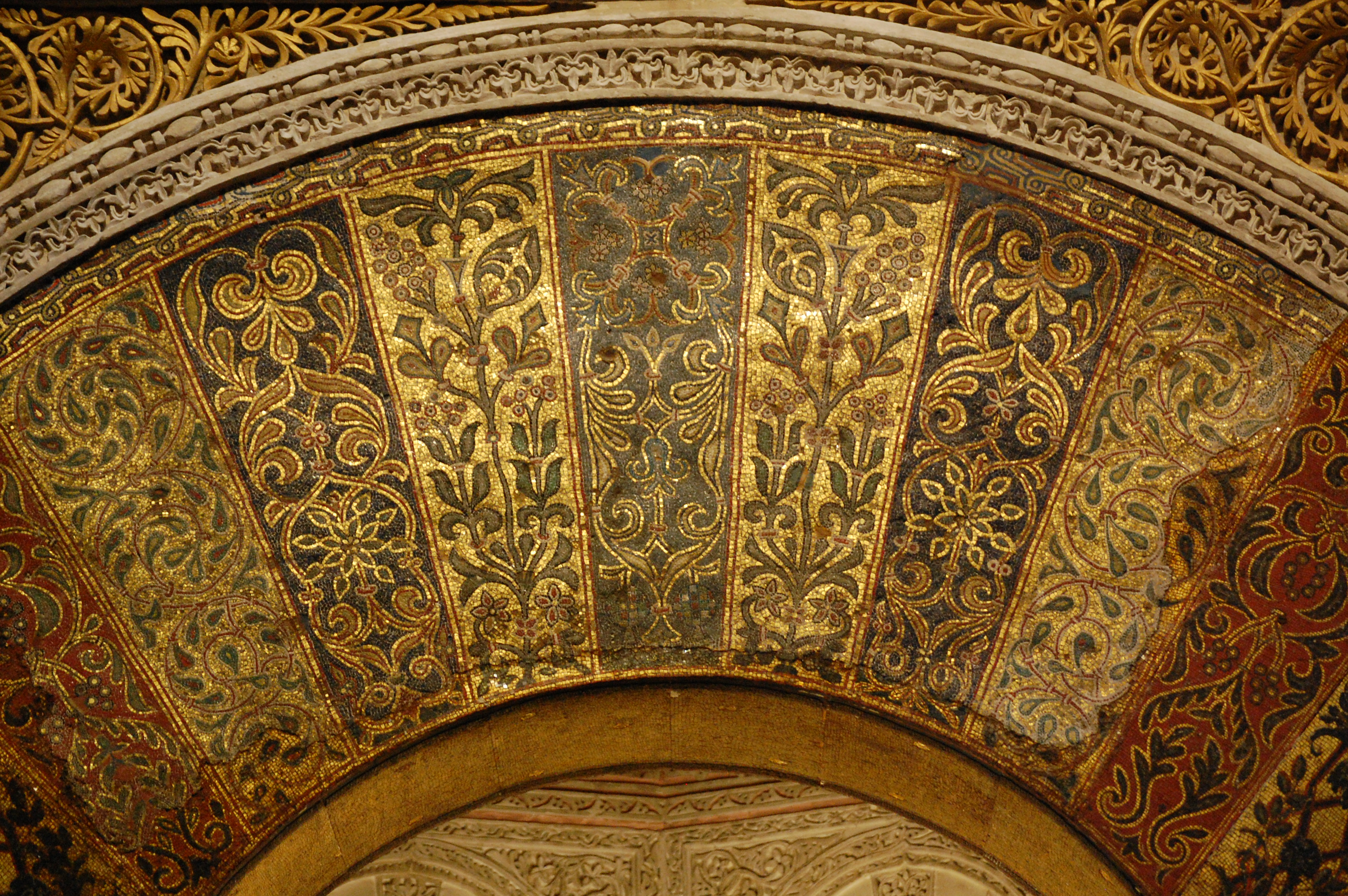
The mosaics in the voussoirs of the mihrab arch

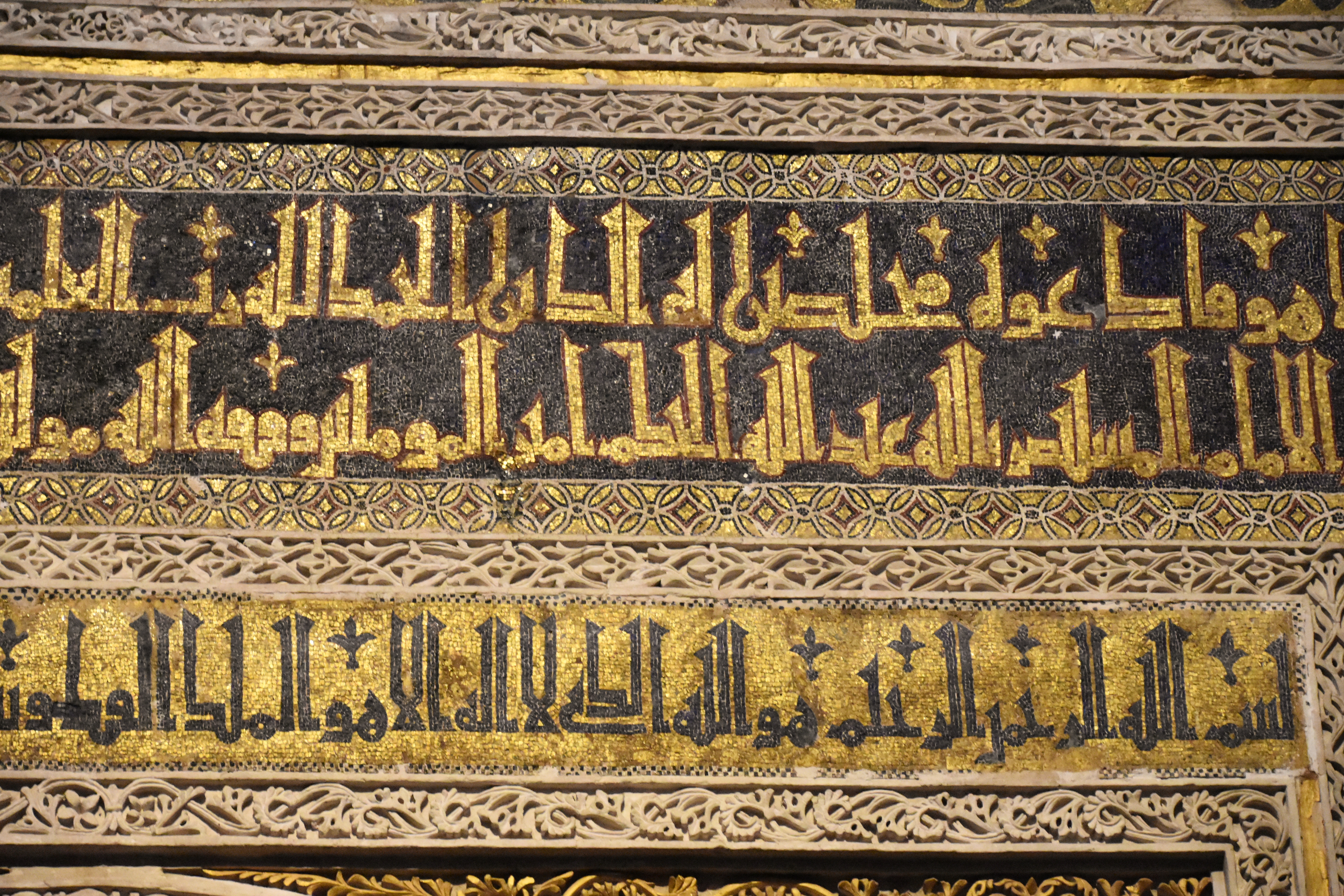
Part of the Kufic inscriptions in the mosaics of the alfiz above the mihrab

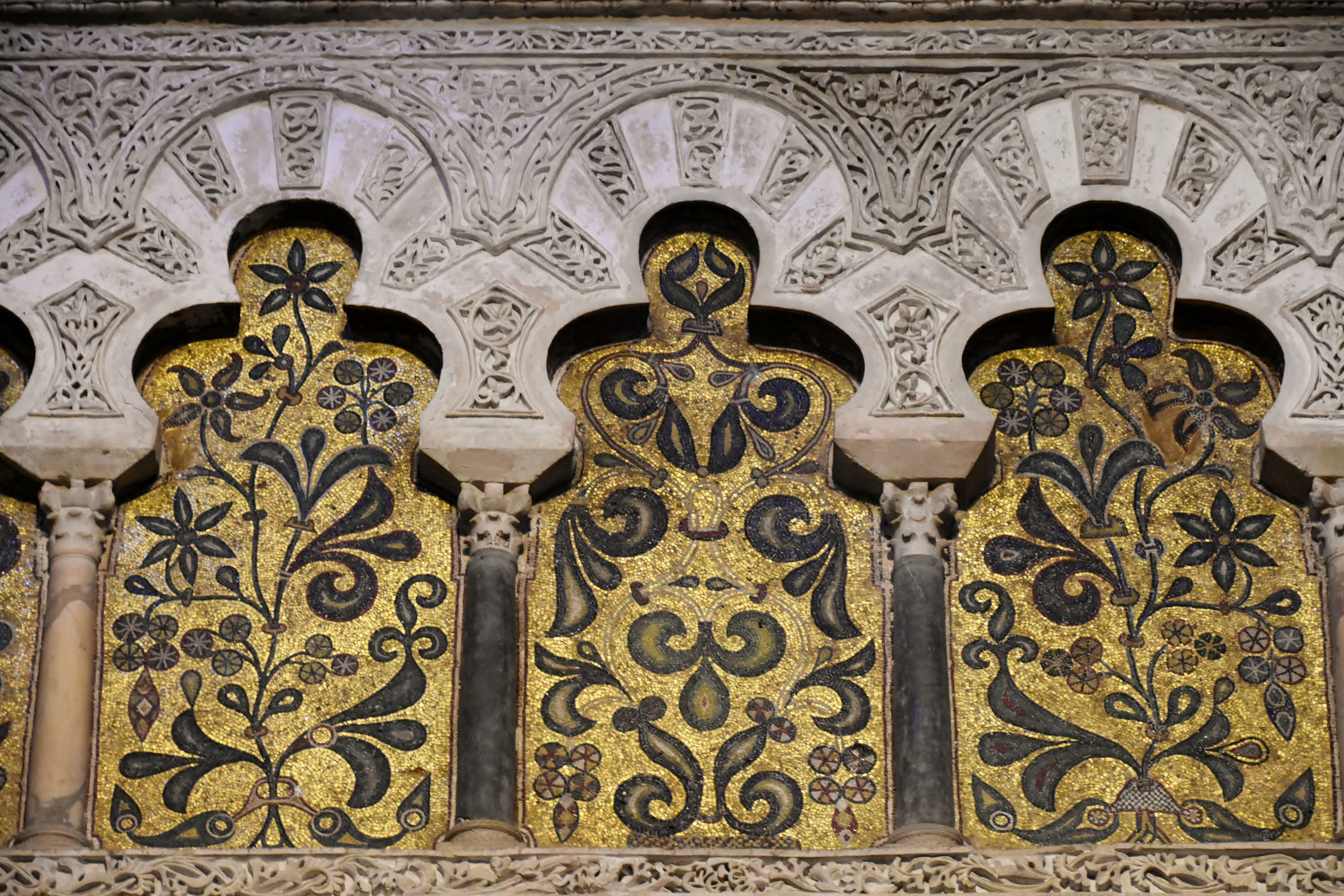
The blind arcade above the alfiz, with mosaics

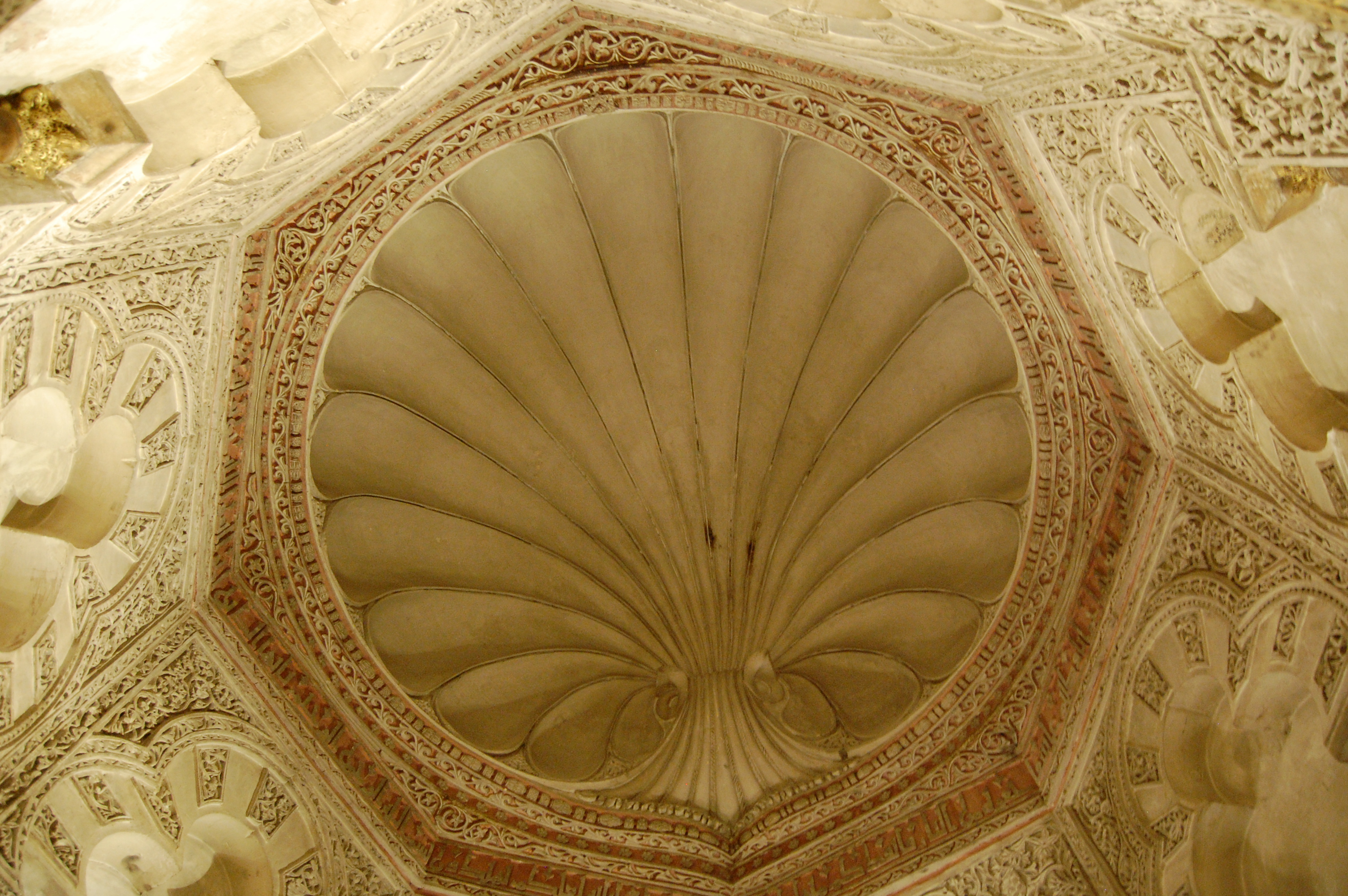
Interior of the mihrab and its shell-shaped dome

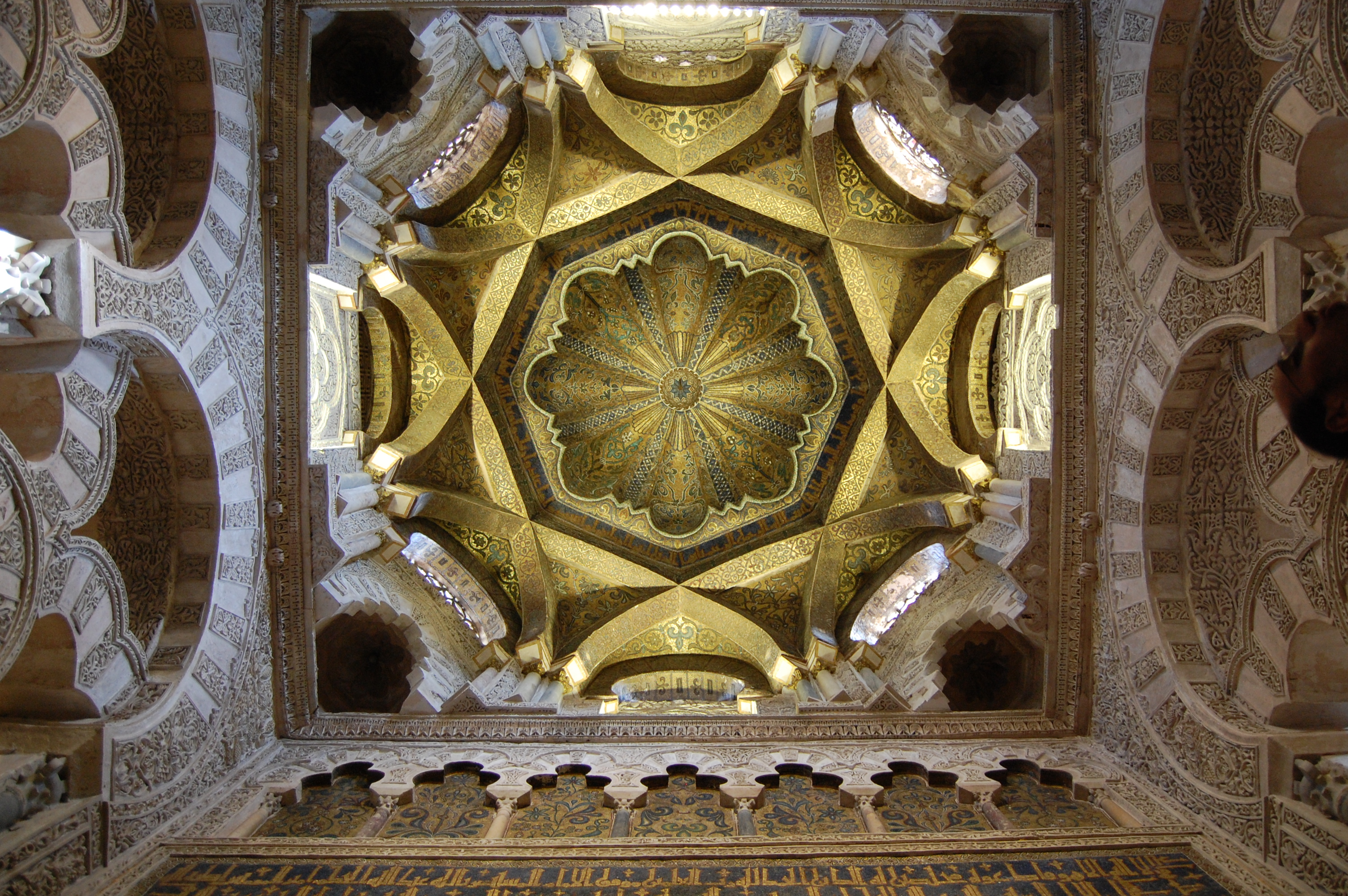
The middle dome over the maqsura, in front of the mihrab

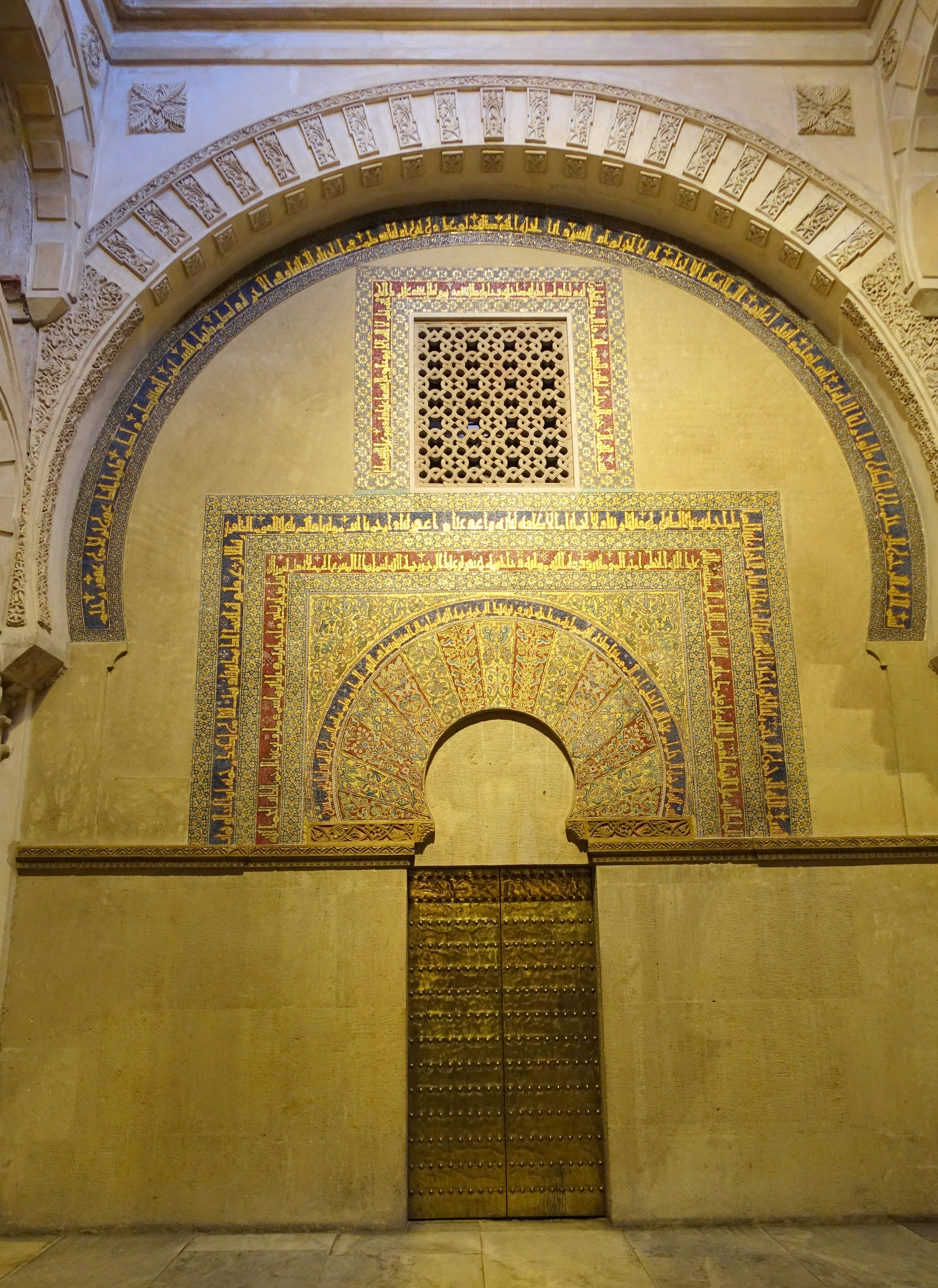
Bab Bayt al-Mal, to the left of the mihrab, the door that led to the mosque's treasury

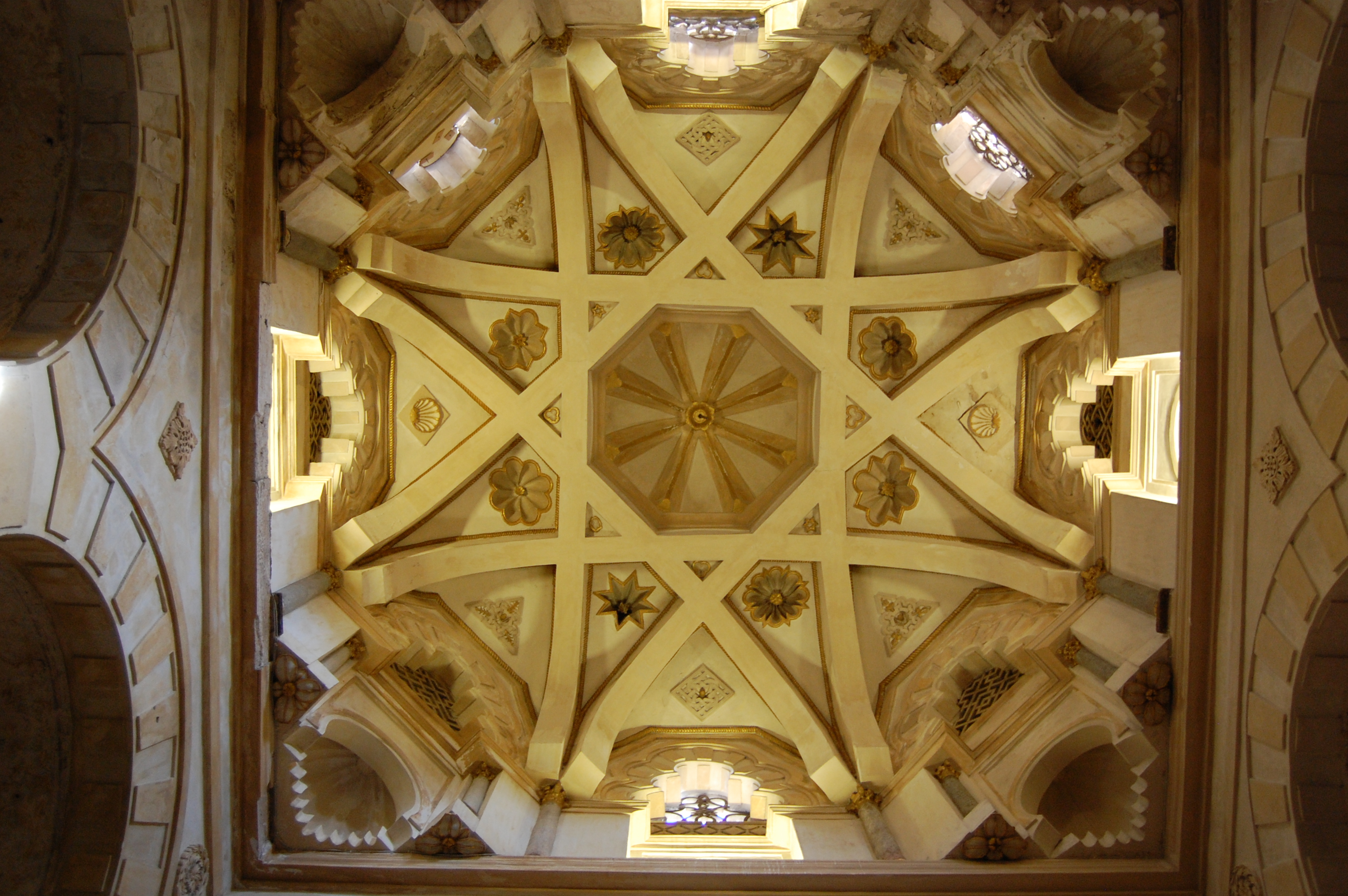
Dome in front of the Bab Bayt al-Mal

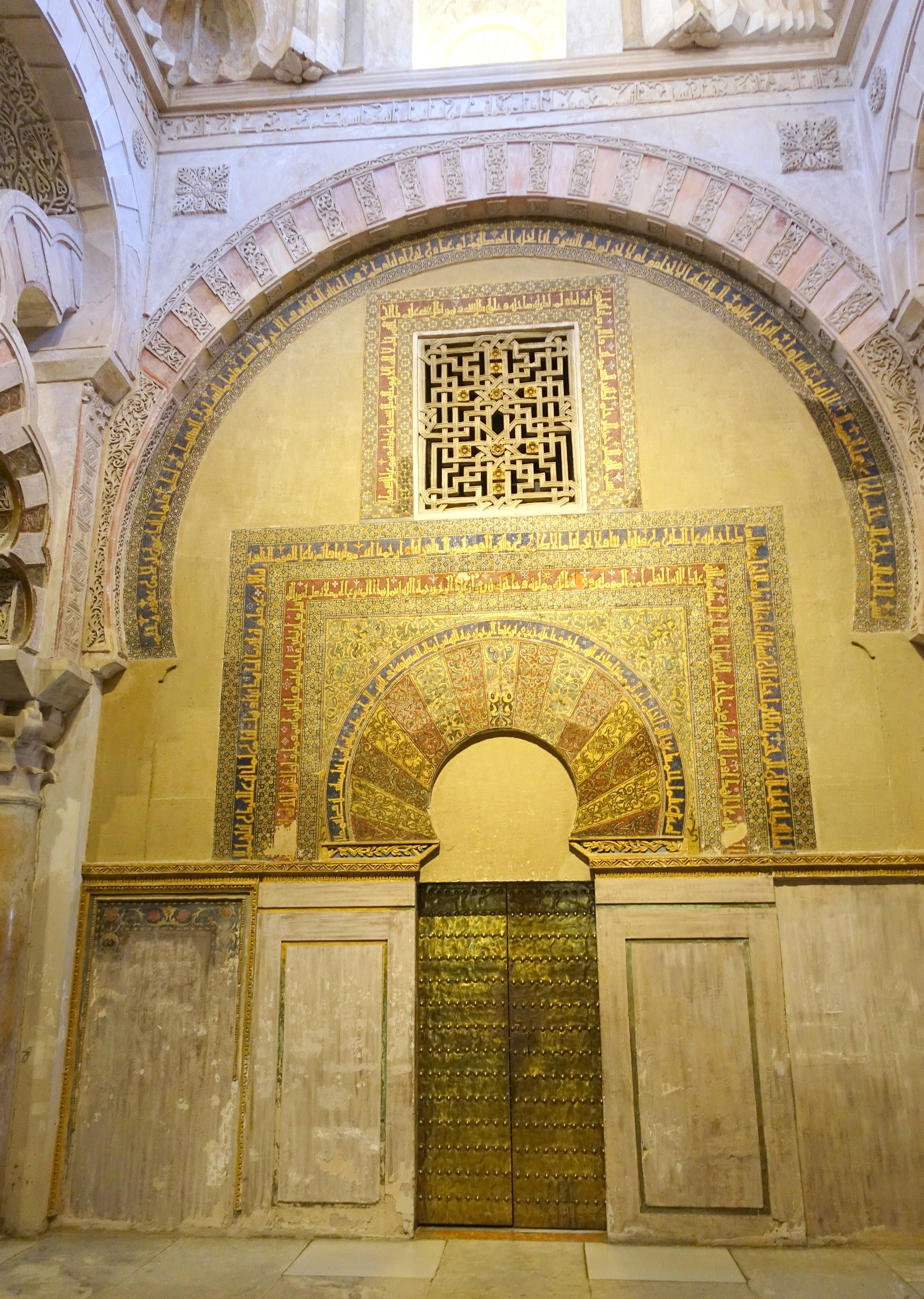
Bab al Sabat, to the right of the mihrab, the door that led to the passage linking with the Caliph's palace

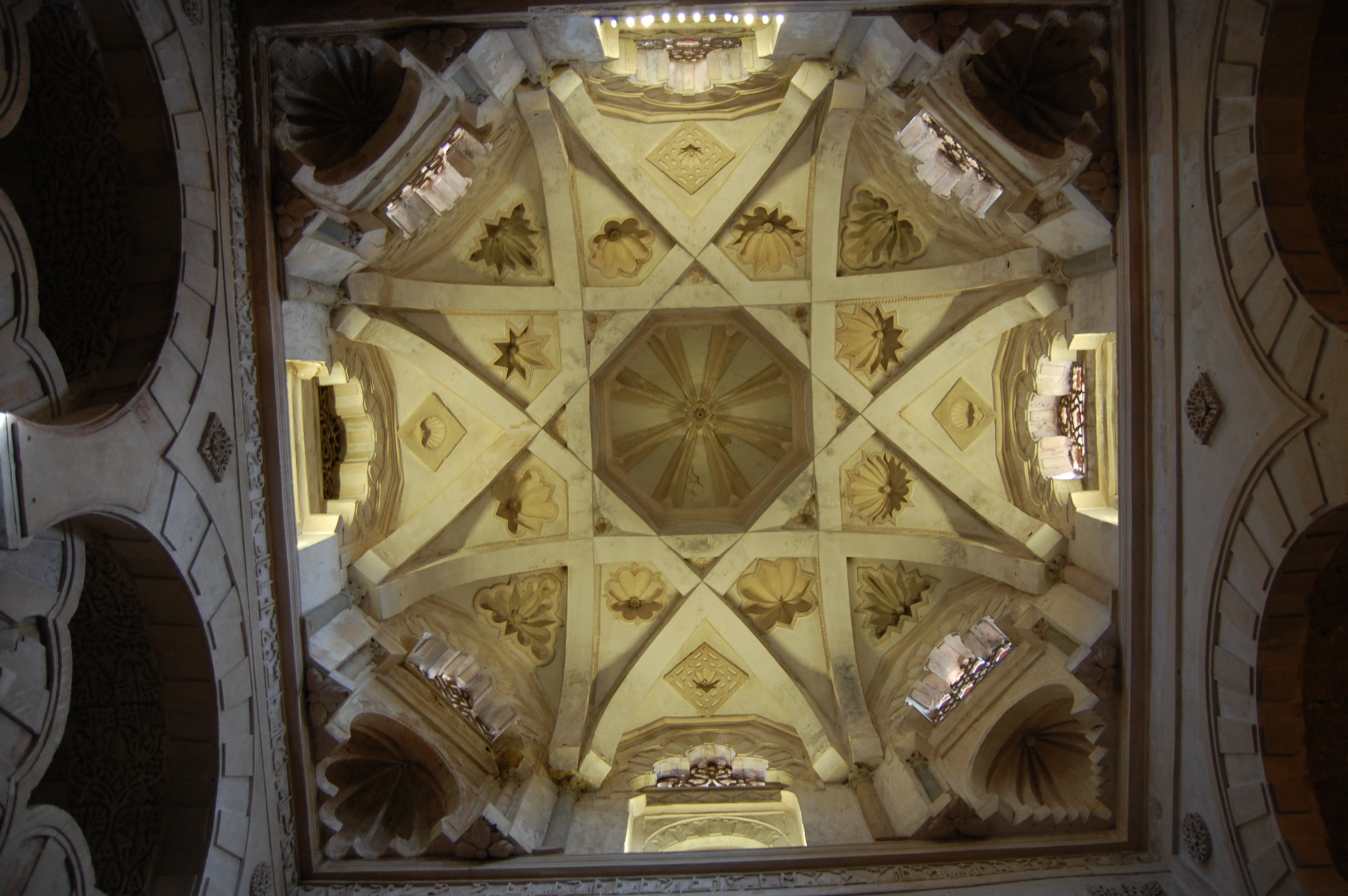
Dome in front of the Bab al-Sabat

===== Arabic inscriptions =====
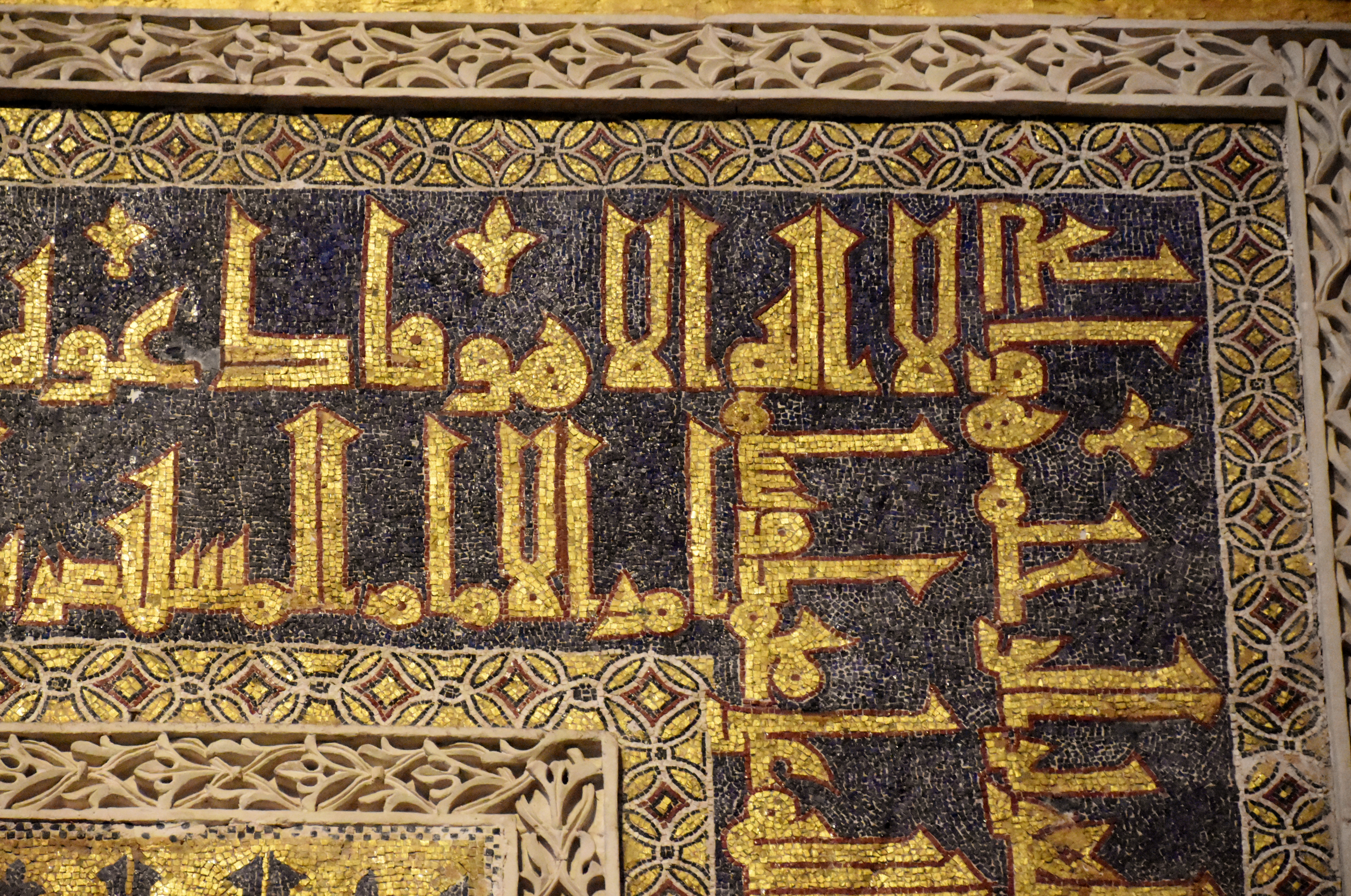
Part of the main Arabic inscription in the alfiz around the mihrab, executed in gold Kufic characters. It contains excerpts from the Qur'an and a foundation text praising al-Hakam II.

The Arabic inscriptions in the decoration around the mihrab are the first major example of a program of political-religious inscriptions inserted into Andalusi architecture. They contain selected excerpts from the Qur'an as well as foundation inscriptions praising the patron (Caliph Al-Hakam II) and the people who assisted in the construction project.

The largest inscription of the alfiz (rectangular frame) around the mihrab, executed with mosaics in gold Kufic characters on a dark background, begins with two excerpts from the Qur'an (Surah 32:6 and Surah 40:65), translated as:

Such is He, the Knower of all things, hidden and open, the Exalted, the Merciful. He is the Living, there is no God but He; call upon Him, giving Him sincere devotion, praise be to God the Lord of the worlds.

This is followed by a text commemorating al-Hakam's expansion:

Thanks be to God Lord of the worlds who chose the Imam al-Mustansir Billah, 'Abd allah al-Hakam amir al-mu'minin, may God preserve him in righteousness, for this venerable construction and who was his aid in [effecting] his eternal structure, for the goal of making it more spacious for his followers...in fulfillment of his and their wishes, and as an expression of his grace them.

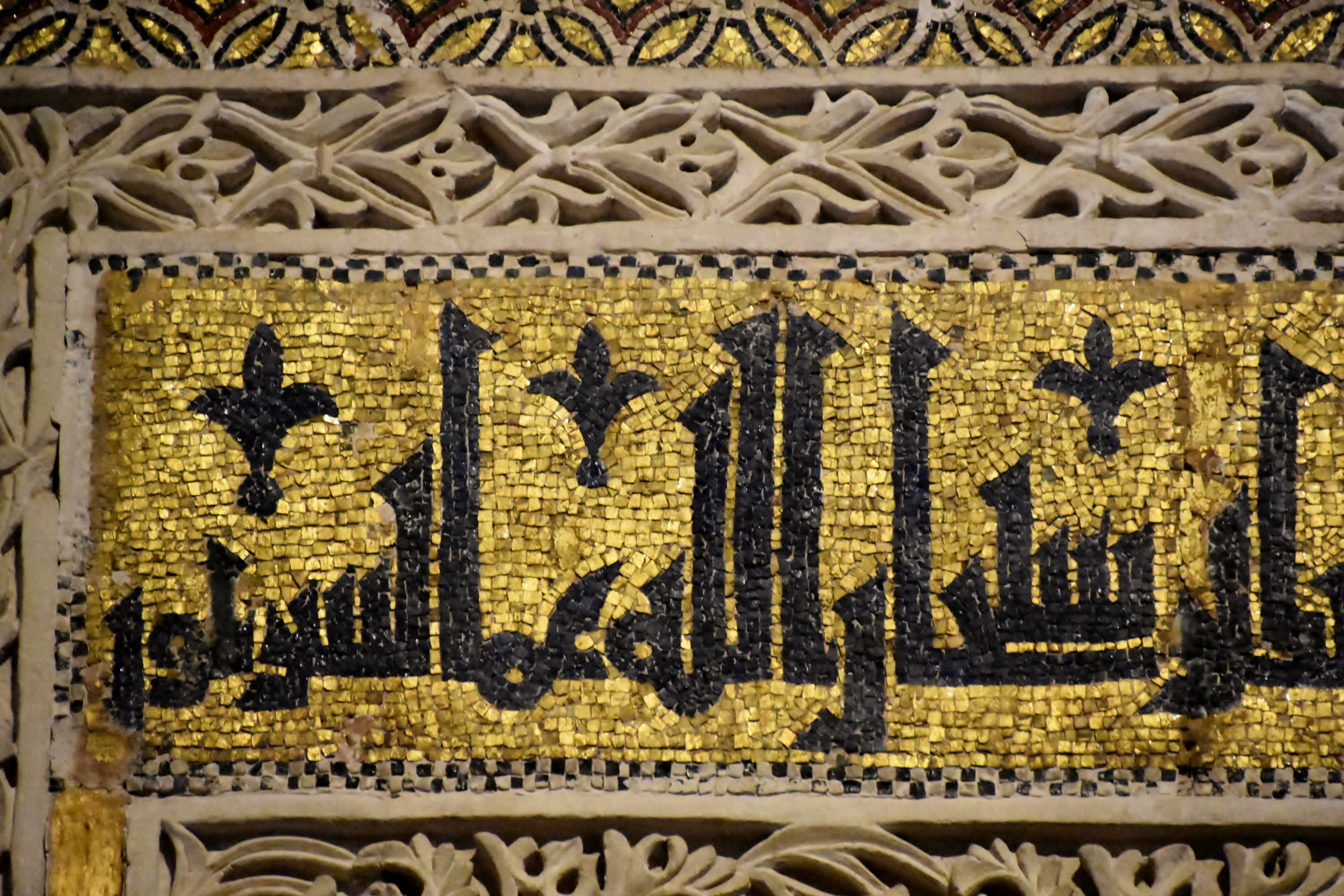
Detail of the second, shorter inscription above the mihrab

Immediately inside this rectangular inscription frame is a shorter inscription in a horizontal mosaic band above the mihrab, in dark letters against a gold background, which quotes Surah 59:23, translated as:

God is He, than Whom there is no other god. The Sovereign, the Holy One, the Source of Peace (and Perfection), the Guardian of Faith; the Preserver of Safety, the Exalted in Might, the Irresistible, the Supreme. Glory be to God! (High is He) above the partners they attribute to Him.

More inscriptions are carved into the stone imposts on either side of the mihrab niche's arch, above the small engaged columns. They include a commemoration of al-Hakam II's command to "set up these two supports of what he has founded upon purity and with sanction from God", along with a portion of Surah 7:43. The "two supports" may be a reference to the columns of the mihrab, but the wider text likely adds a metaphorical and more religious interpretation.

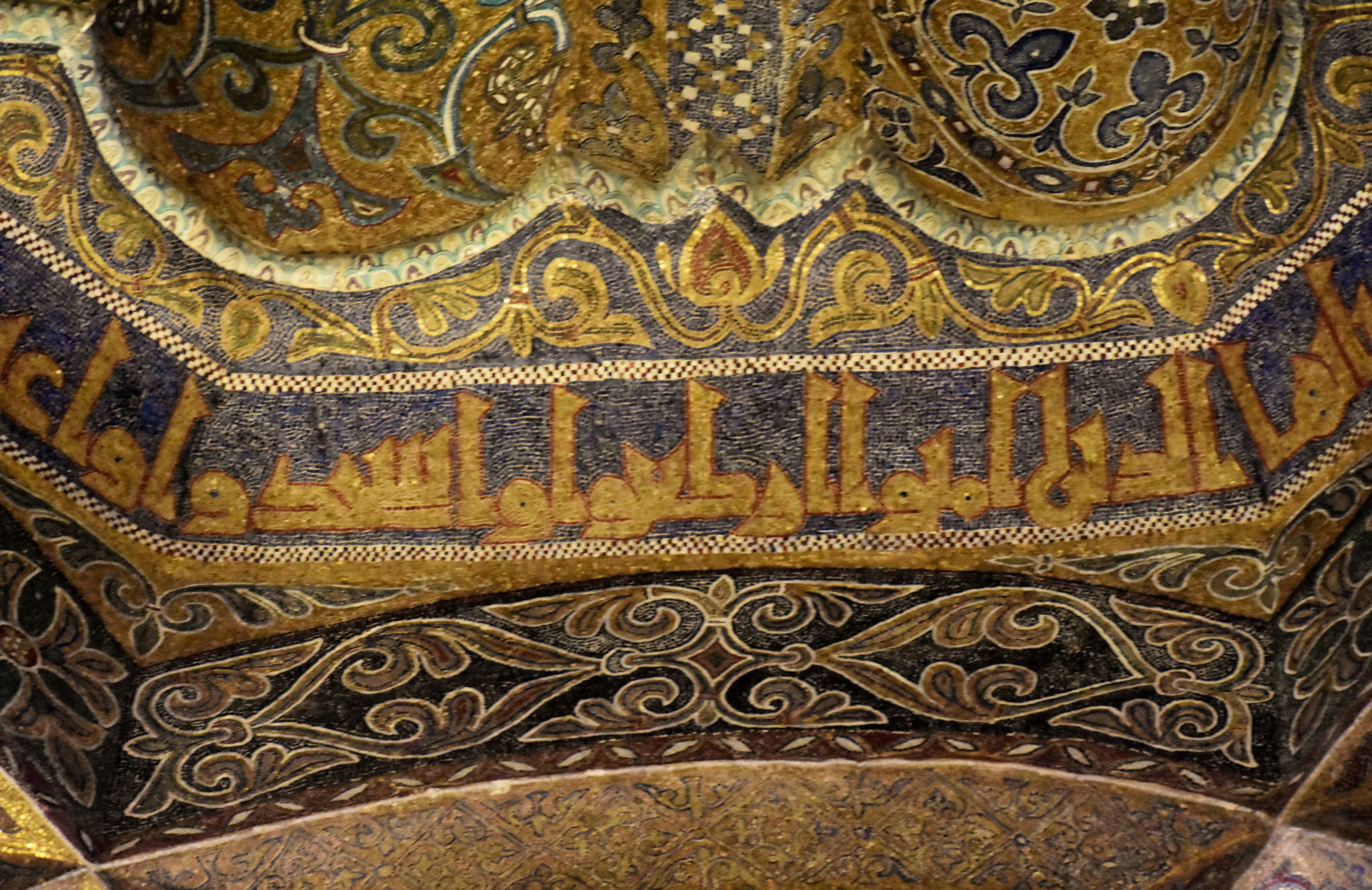
Part of the inscription around the central dome of the maqsura

An inscription is also included in the mosaics of the middle dome of the maqsura, in front of the mihrab. It runs around the base of the central octagonal cupola and contains verses from the Qur'an (Surah 22: 77–78). The translation reads:

O ye who believe! Bow down, prostrate yourselves, and adore your Lord; and do good; that ye may prosper. And strive in His cause as ye ought to strive, (with sincerity and under discipline). He has chosen you, and has imposed no difficulties on you in religion; it is the culture of your father Abraham. It is He Who has named you Muslims, both before and in this (Revelation); that the Apostle may be a witness for you, and ye be witnesses for mankind!

Nuha N. N. Khoury, a scholar of Islamic architecture, has interpreted this collection of inscriptions in al-Hakam II's expansion of the building as an attempt to present the mosque as a "universal Islamic shrine", similar to the mosques of Mecca and Medina, and to portray Caliph al-Hakam II as the instrument through which God built this shrine. This framed the official history of the Umayyad dynasty in prophetic terms, promoting the idea of the new Umayyad caliphs in Cordoba as having a universal prerogative in the Islamic world.

=== The courtyard ===
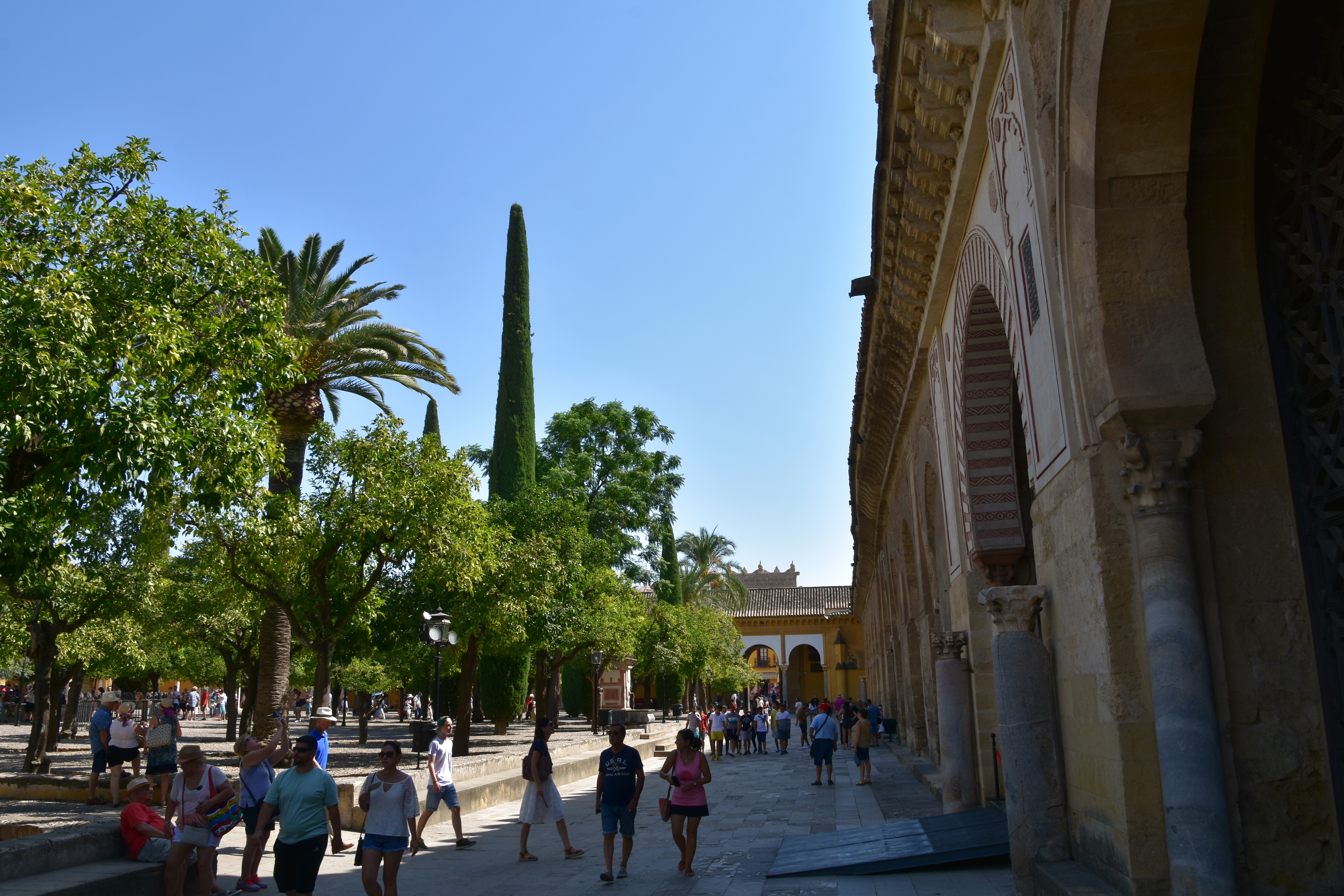
The Courtyard of the Orange Trees today

The courtyard is known today as the Patio de los Naranjos or "Courtyard of the Orange Trees". Until the 11th century, the mosque courtyard (also known as a sahn) was unpaved earth with citrus and palm trees irrigated at first by rainwater cisterns and later by aqueduct. Excavation indicates the trees were planted in a pattern, with surface irrigation channels. The stone channels visible today are not original. As in most mosque courtyards, it had fountains or water basins to help Muslims perform ritual ablutions before prayer. The arches that marked the transition from the courtyard to the interior of the prayer hall were originally open and allowed natural light to penetrate the interior, but most of these arches were walled up during the Christian period (after 1236) as chapels were built along the northern edge of the hall. The courtyard of the original mosque of Abd ar-Rahman I had no surrounding gallery or portico, but it is believed that one was added by Abd ar-Rahman III between 951 and 958. The current gallery, however, was rebuilt with a similar design by architect Hernán Ruiz I under Bishop Martín Fernández de Angulo between 1510 and 1516. The current layout of the gardens and trees is the result of work carried out under Bishop Francisco Reinoso between 1597 and 1601. Today the courtyard is planted with rows of orange trees, cypresses, and palm trees.

=== Bell tower and former minaret ===
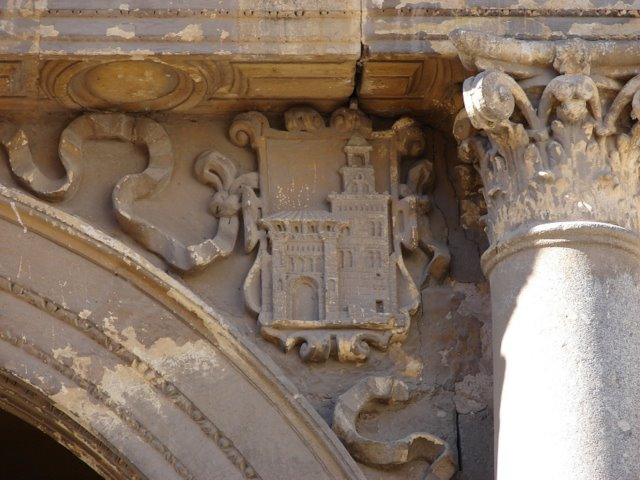
One of the coat-of-arms on the Puerta de Santa Catalina (gate on the east side of the courtyard today) which depicts the minaret tower (serving as a bell tower) before its reconstruction in 1593

Abd al-Rahman III added the mosque's first minaret (tower used by the muezzin for the call to prayer) in the mid-10th century. The minaret has since disappeared after it was partly demolished and encased in the Renaissance bell tower that is visible today. It was designed by Hernán Ruiz III and built between 1593 and 1617. The minaret's original appearance, however, was reconstructed by modern Spanish scholar Félix Hernández Giménez with the help archeological evidence as well as historical texts and representations. (For example, the two coat-of-arms on the present-day cathedral's Puerta de Santa Catalina depict the tower as it appeared before its later reconstruction.)

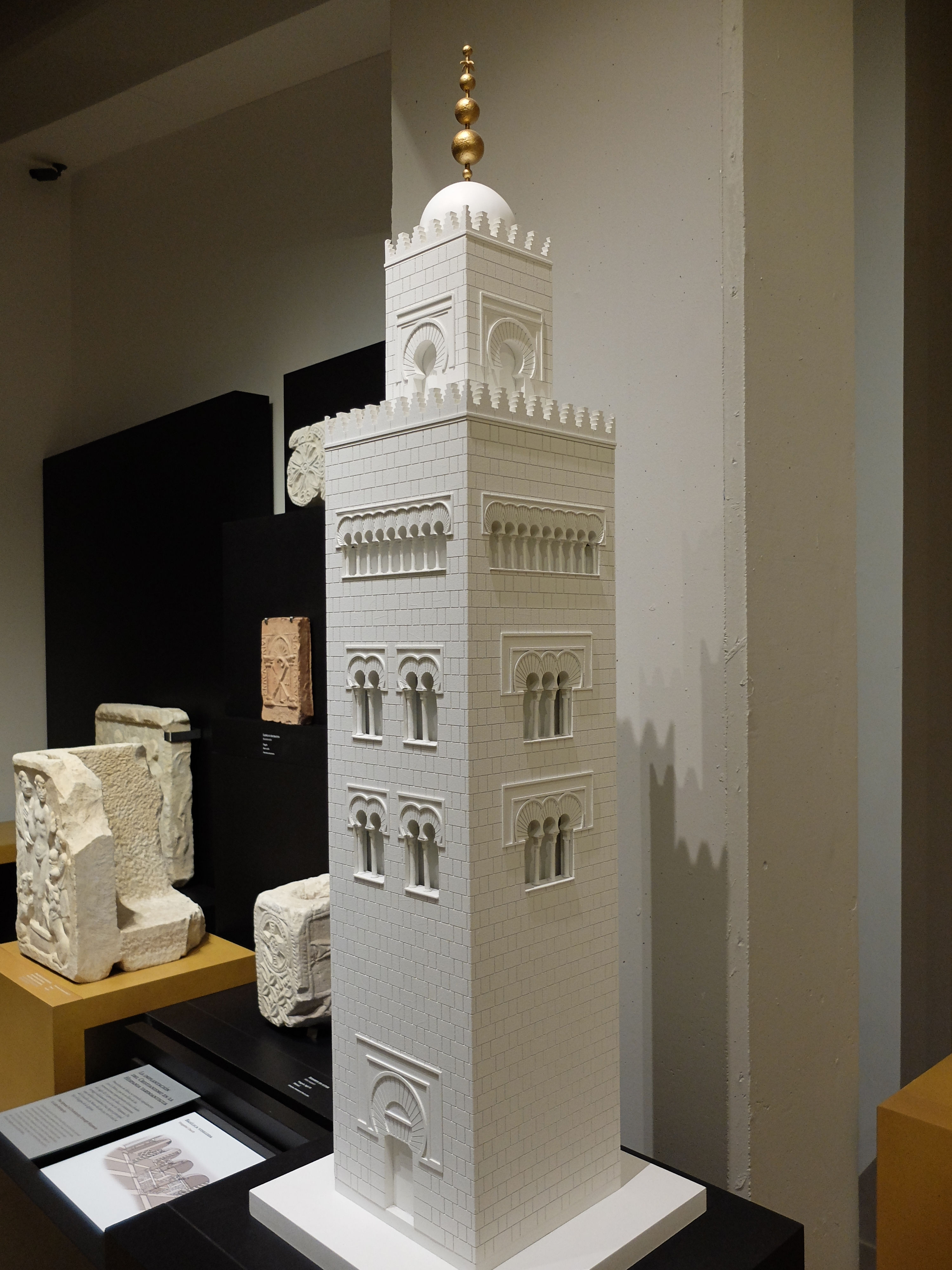
Model of the reconstructed minaret of Abd ar-Rahman III at the Archeological Museum of Cordoba

The original minaret was 47 meters high and had a square base measuring 8.5 meters per side. Like other Andalusi and North African minarets after it, it was composed of a main shaft and a smaller secondary tower or "lantern" (also with a square base) which surmounted it. The lantern tower was in turn surmounted by a dome and topped by a finial in the shape of a metal rod with two golden spheres and one silver sphere (often referred to as "apples") decreasing in size towards the top. The main tower contained two staircases, which were built for the separate ascent and descent of the tower. About half-way up, the stairways were lit by sets of horseshoe-arch windows whose arches were decorated with voussoirs of alternating colours which were in turn surrounded by a rectangular alfiz frame (similar to the decoration seen around the arches of the mosque's outer gates). On two of the tower's façades there were three of these windows side by side, while on the two other façades the windows were arranged in two pairs. These double pairs or triplets of windows were repeated on the level above. Just below the summit of the main shaft on each façade, above the windows, was a row of nine smaller windows of equivalent shape and decoration. The top edge of the main shaft was crowned with a balustrade of sawtooth-shaped merlons (similar to those commonly found in Morocco). The lantern tower was decorated by another horseshoe archway on each of its four façades, again featuring an arch of alternating voussoirs framed within an alfiz.

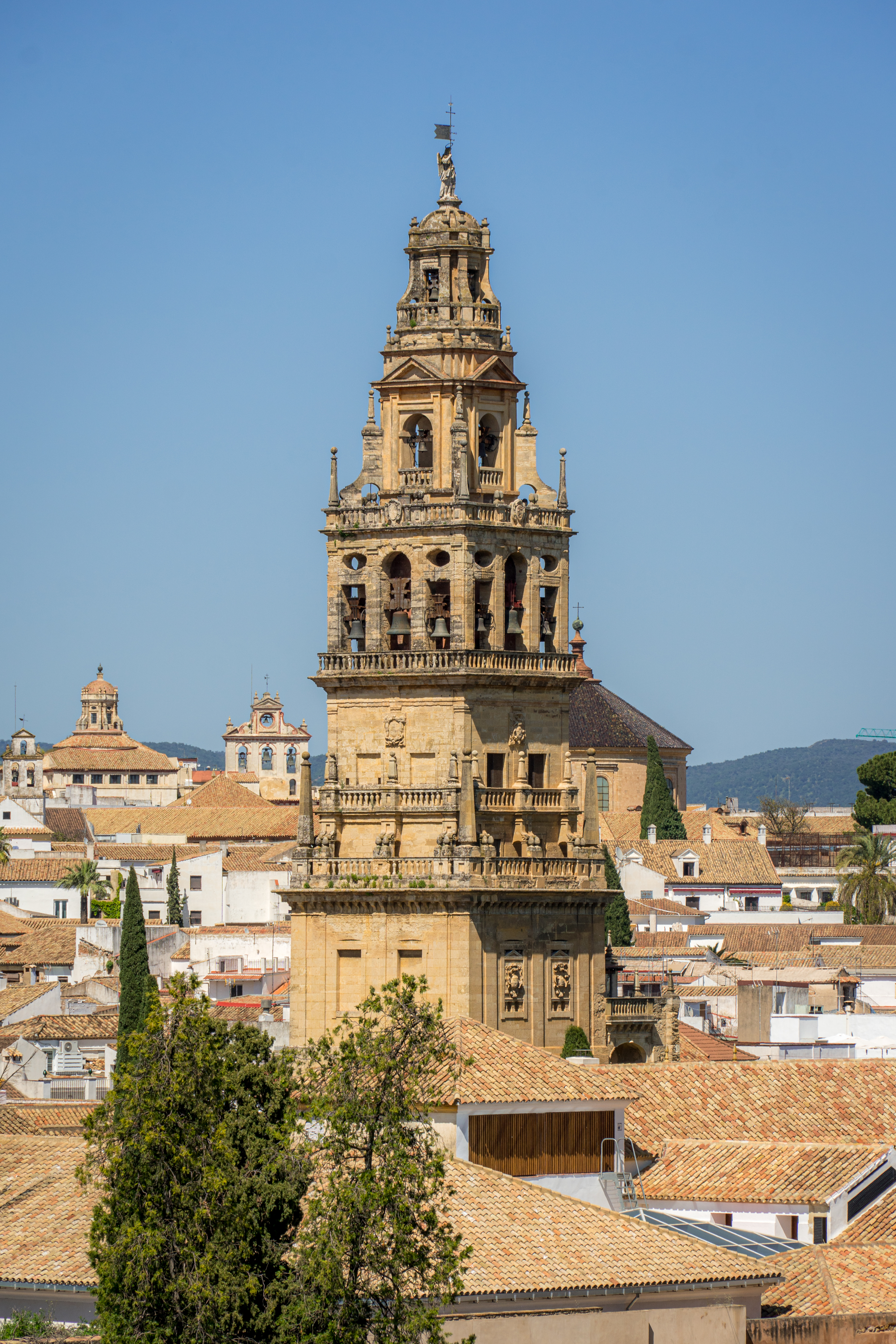
The bell tower today, dating from the late 16th and 17th centuries

Construction of a new cathedral bell tower to encase the old minaret began in 1593 and, after some delays, was finished in 1617. It was designed by architect Hernan Ruiz III (grandson of Hernan Ruiz I), who built the tower up to the bell's level but died before its completion. His plans were followed and completed by Juan Sequero de Matilla. The bell tower is 54 meters tall and is the tallest structure in the city. It consists of a solid square shaft up to the level of the bells, where serliana-style openings feature on all four sides. Above this is a lantern structure which in turn is surmounted by a cupola. The dome at the summit is topped by a sculpture of Saint Raphael which was added in 1664 by architect Gaspar de la Peña, who had been hired to perform other repairs and fix structural problems. The sculpture was made by Pedro de la Paz and Bernabé Gómez del Río. Next to the base of the tower is the Puerta del Perdón ("Door of Forgiveness"), one of the two northern gates of the building.

=== The Capilla Mayor and cruciform cathedral core ===
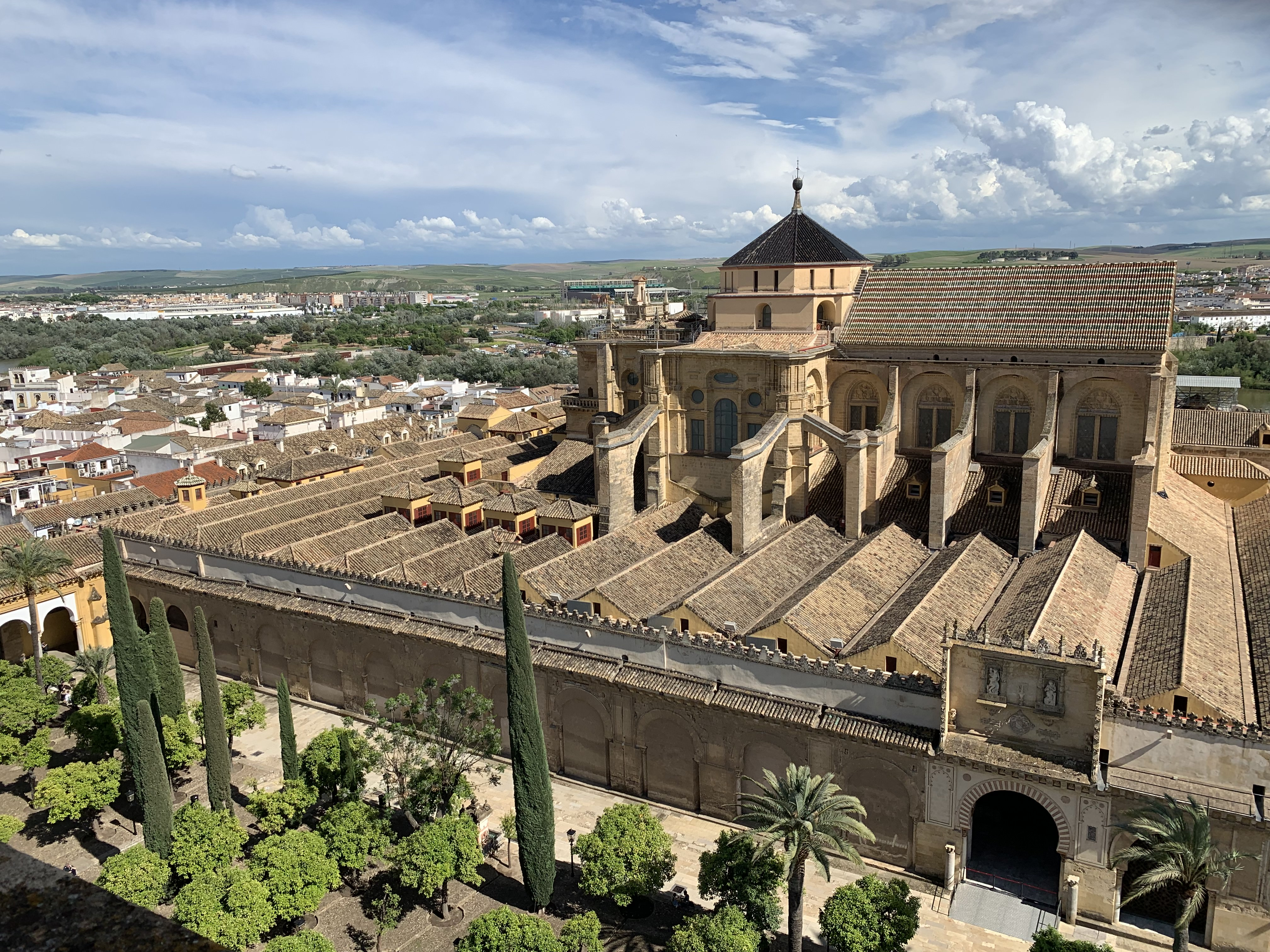
View of the cathedral's roof, with the Capilla Mayor rising above the rest of the structure

The cathedral's main chapel (known from Spanish as the Capilla Mayor) is located at the cruciform nave and transept at the center of the building. This cruciform section was begun in 1523 and finished in 1607. The design was drafted by Hernan Ruiz I, the first architect in charge of the project, and was continued after his death by Hernan Ruiz II (his son) and then by Juan de Ochoa. As a result of this long period and the succession of architects, this cruciform section presents an interesting blend of styles. The first two architects introduced Gothic elements into the design which are visible in the elaborate tracery design of the stone vaults over the transept arms and above the altar. Juan de Ochoa finished the structure in a more Mannerist style typical at the time, finishing the project with an elliptical dome over the crossing and a barrel vault ceiling – with lunettes along the side – over the choir area.

The design and decoration of the ensemble includes extensive iconography. The Gothic-style vault over the main altar is carved with images of musical angels, saints, apostles, and an image of Emperor Charles V (Carlos V), with an image of Mary at the center. The many writings spread amongst the images in turn form a long litany to Mary. The elliptical dome of the crossing rests on four pendentives which are sculpted with images of the four evangelists. On the dome itself, are the images of the eight Fathers of the Church along the outer edge and an image of the Holy Trinity at its center, which together are part of a Counter-Reformist iconographic program. Over the choir area, the central area of the barrel vault ceiling is occupied by images of the Assumption, Saint Acisclus and Saint Victoria, while the sides feature images of David, Solomon, Daniel and Samuel along with the theological virtues.

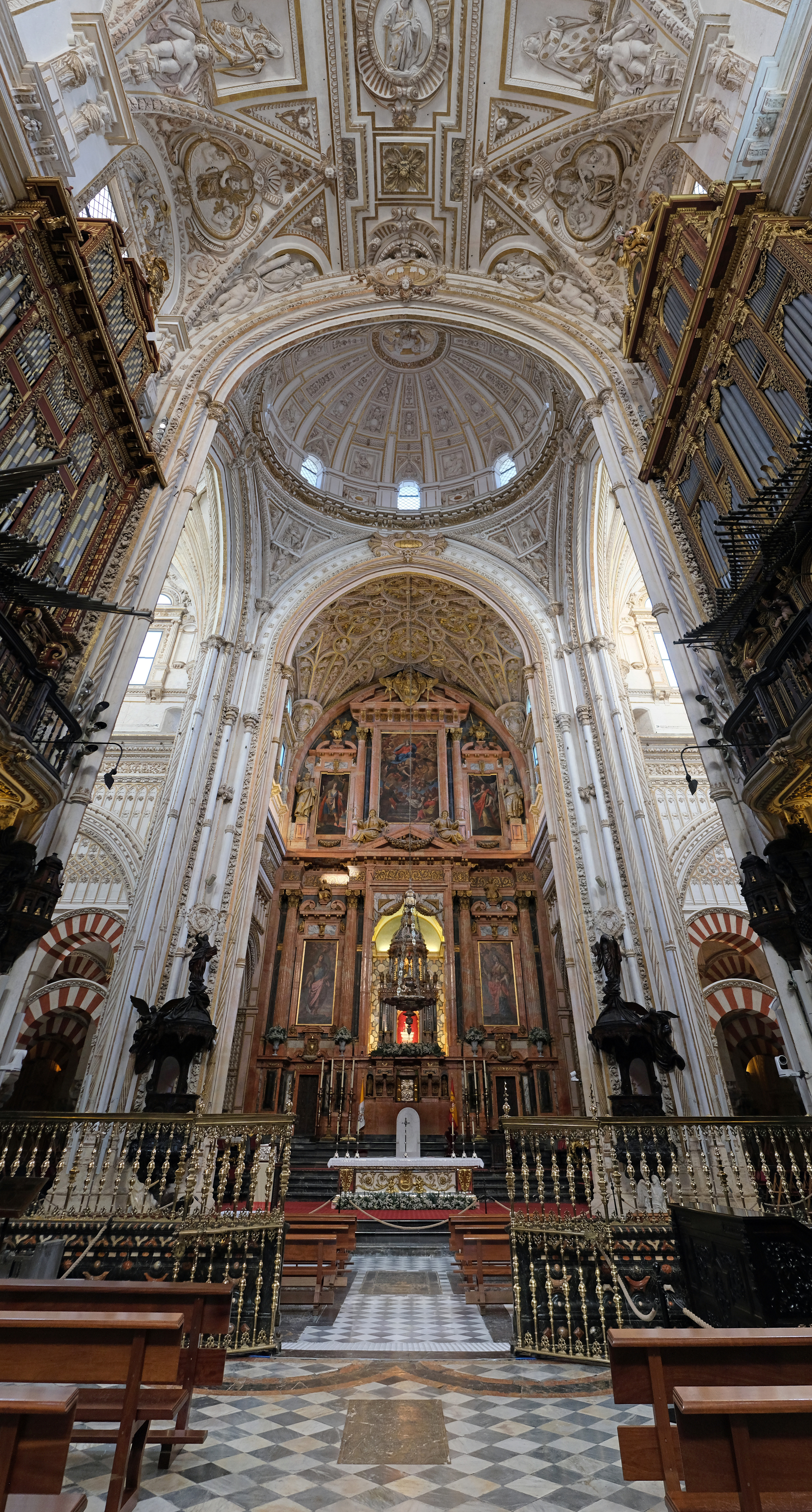
The nave of the cruciform core of the cathedral or Capilla Mayor, looking towards the altar

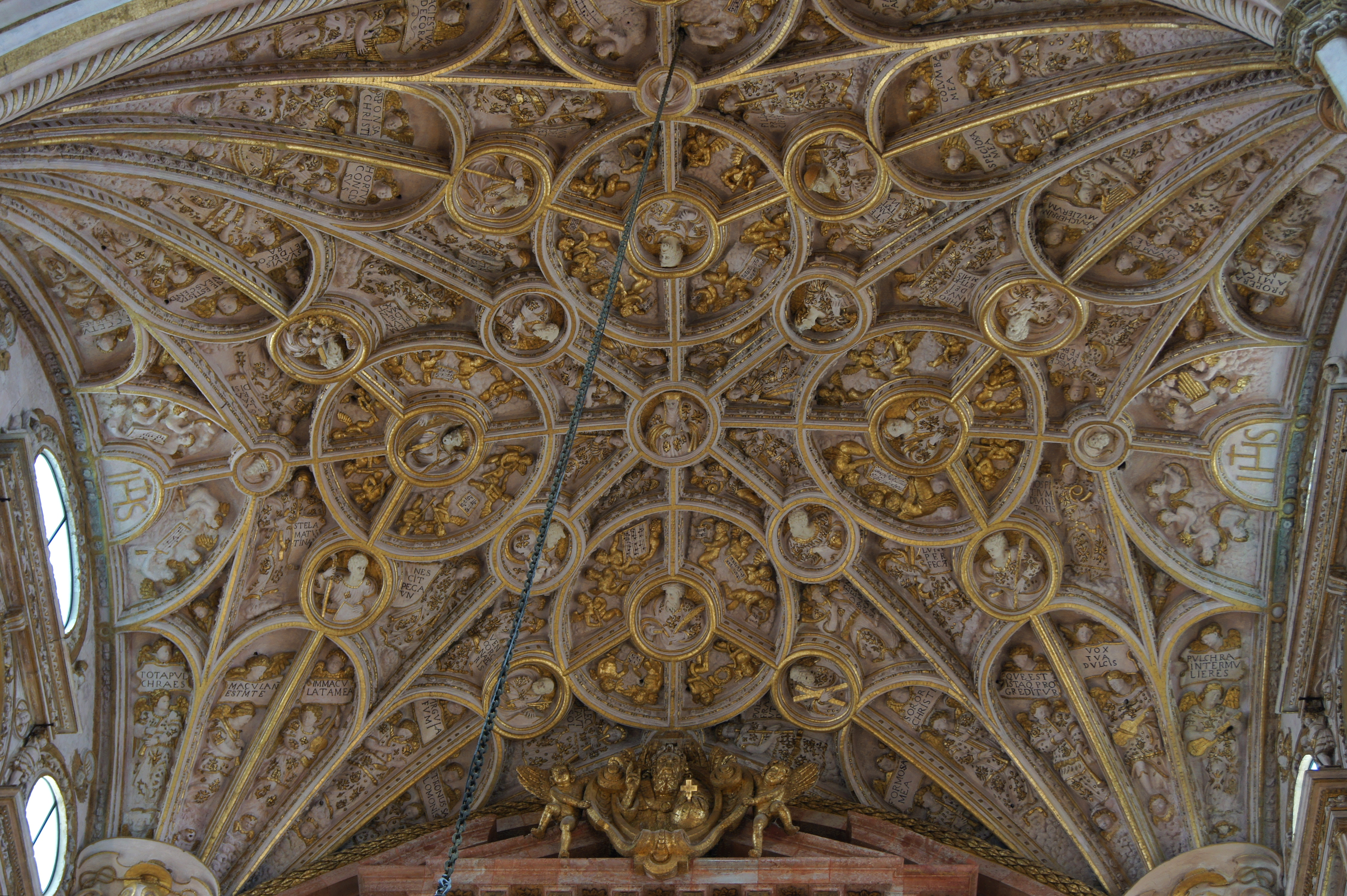
Details of the Gothic lines and iconographic sculpting over the altar of the Capilla Mayor

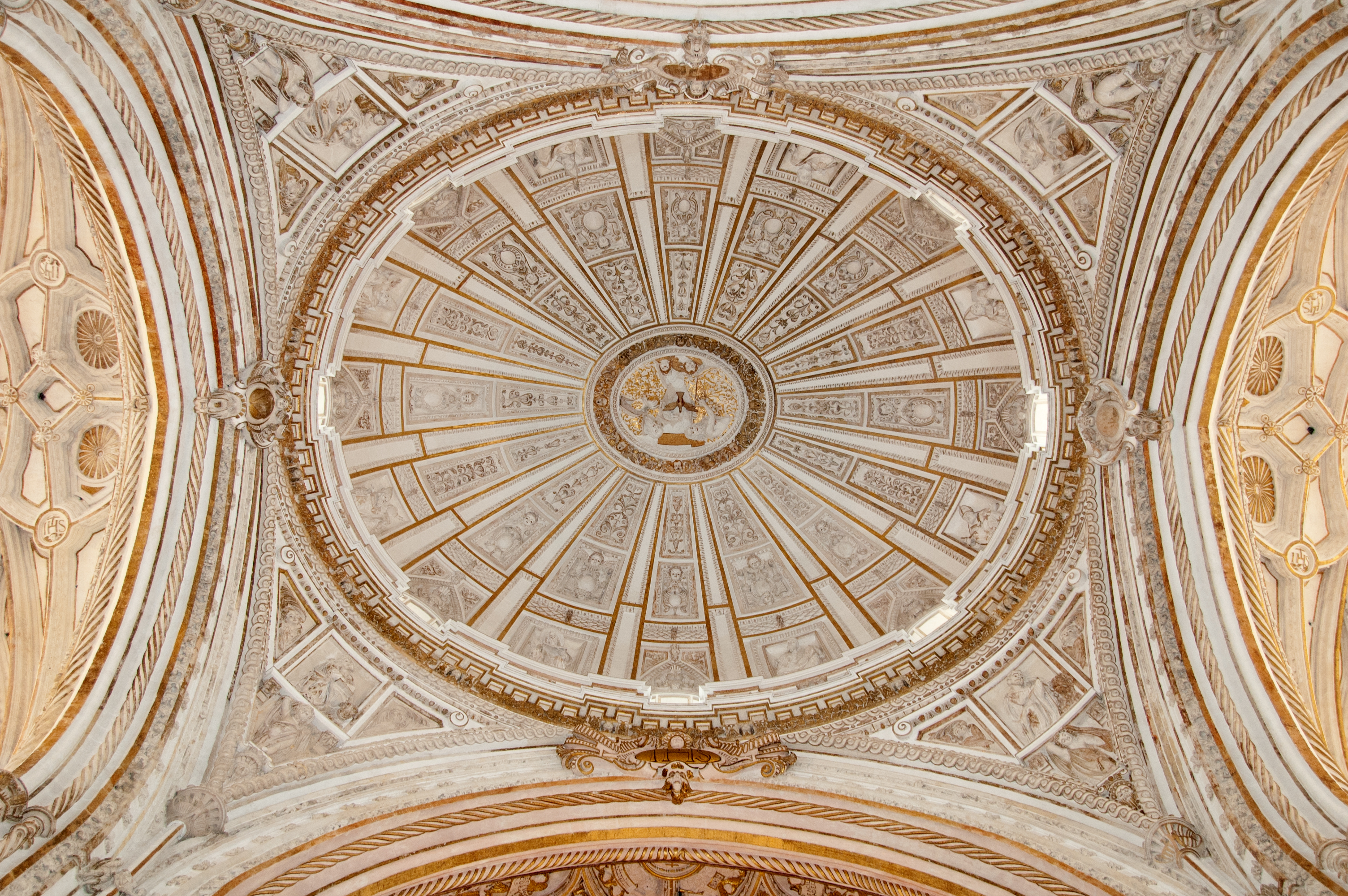
Elliptical dome over the crossing

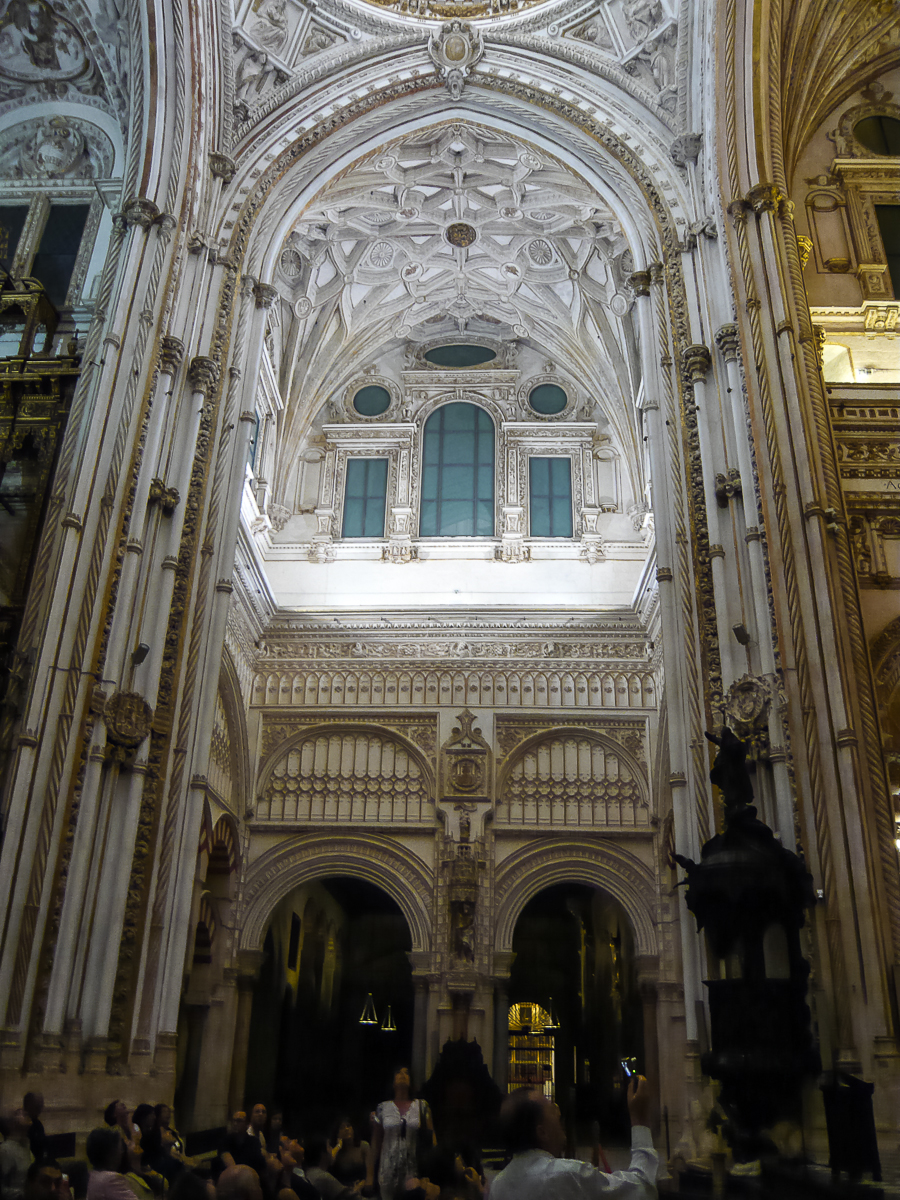
One of the arms of the transept

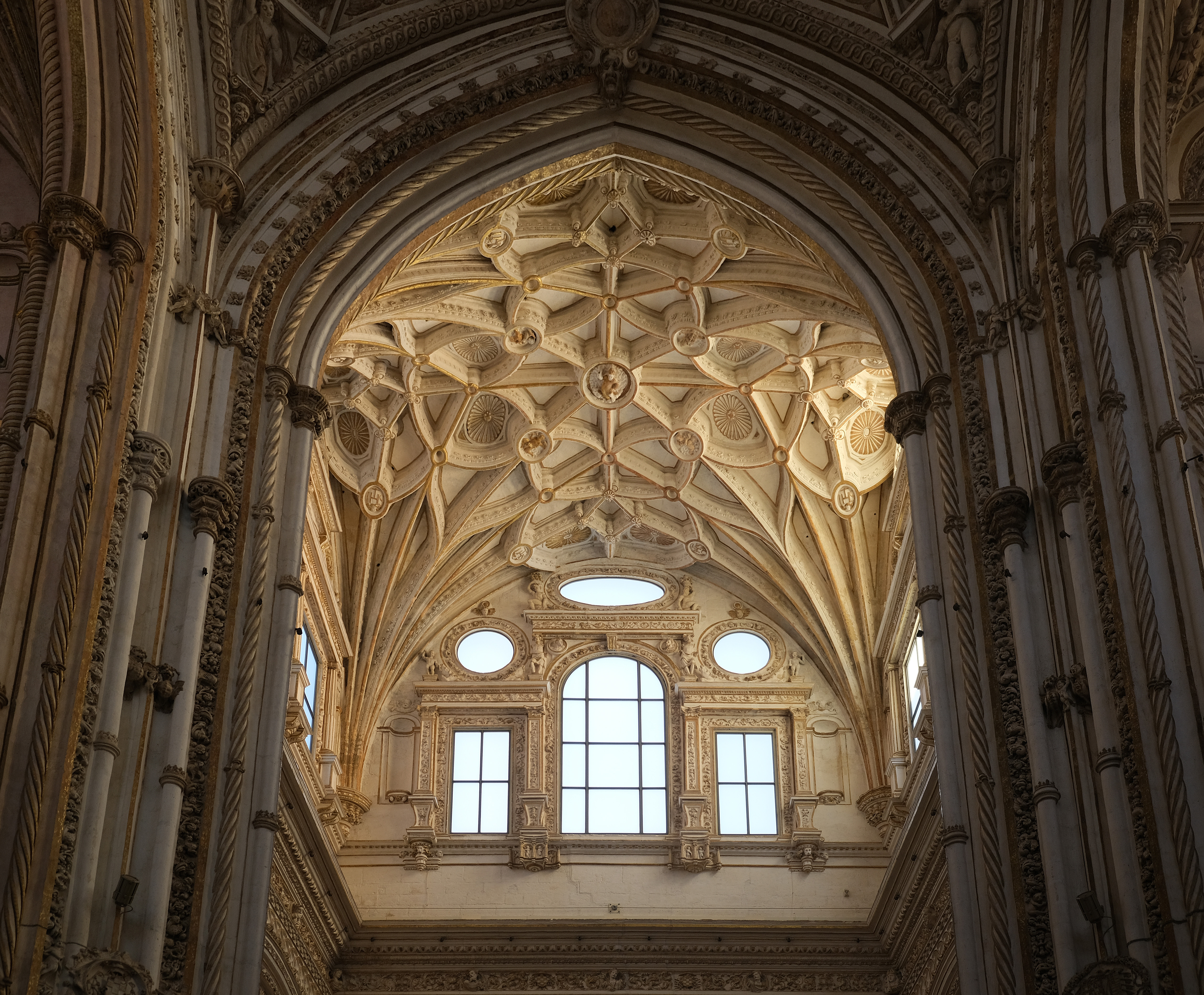
Gothic decoration on the ceilings of the transept arms

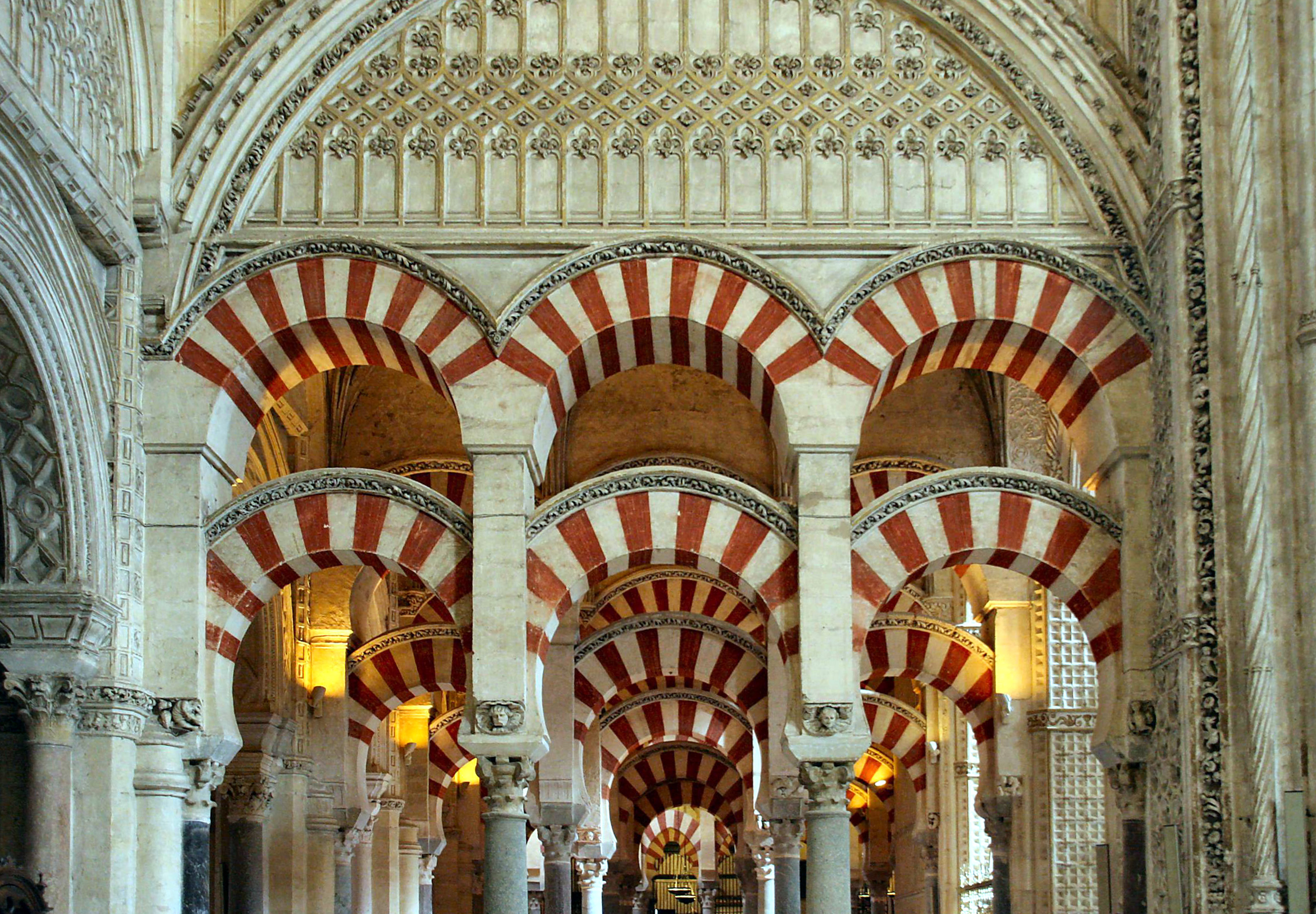
Example of the arches of the former mosque incorporated into the sides of the transept

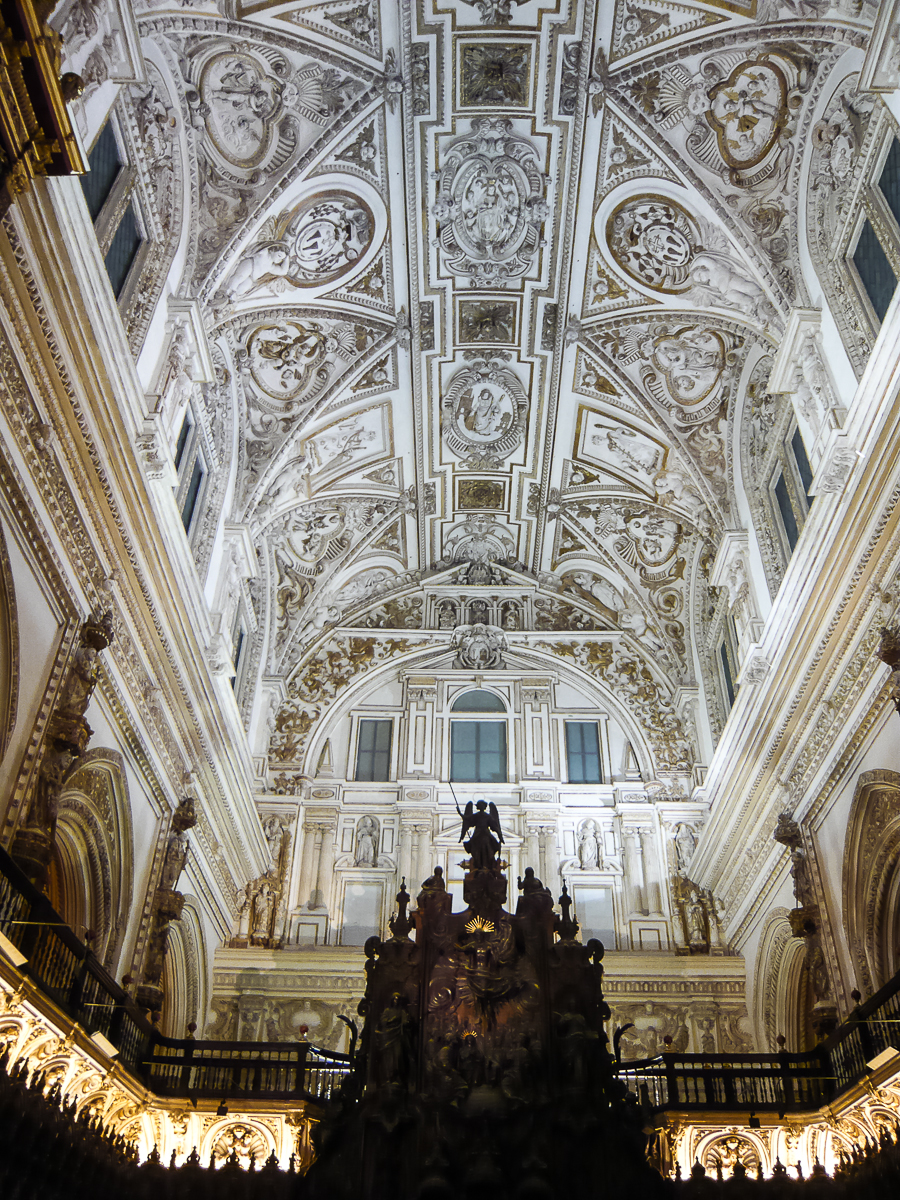
The choir section and ceiling

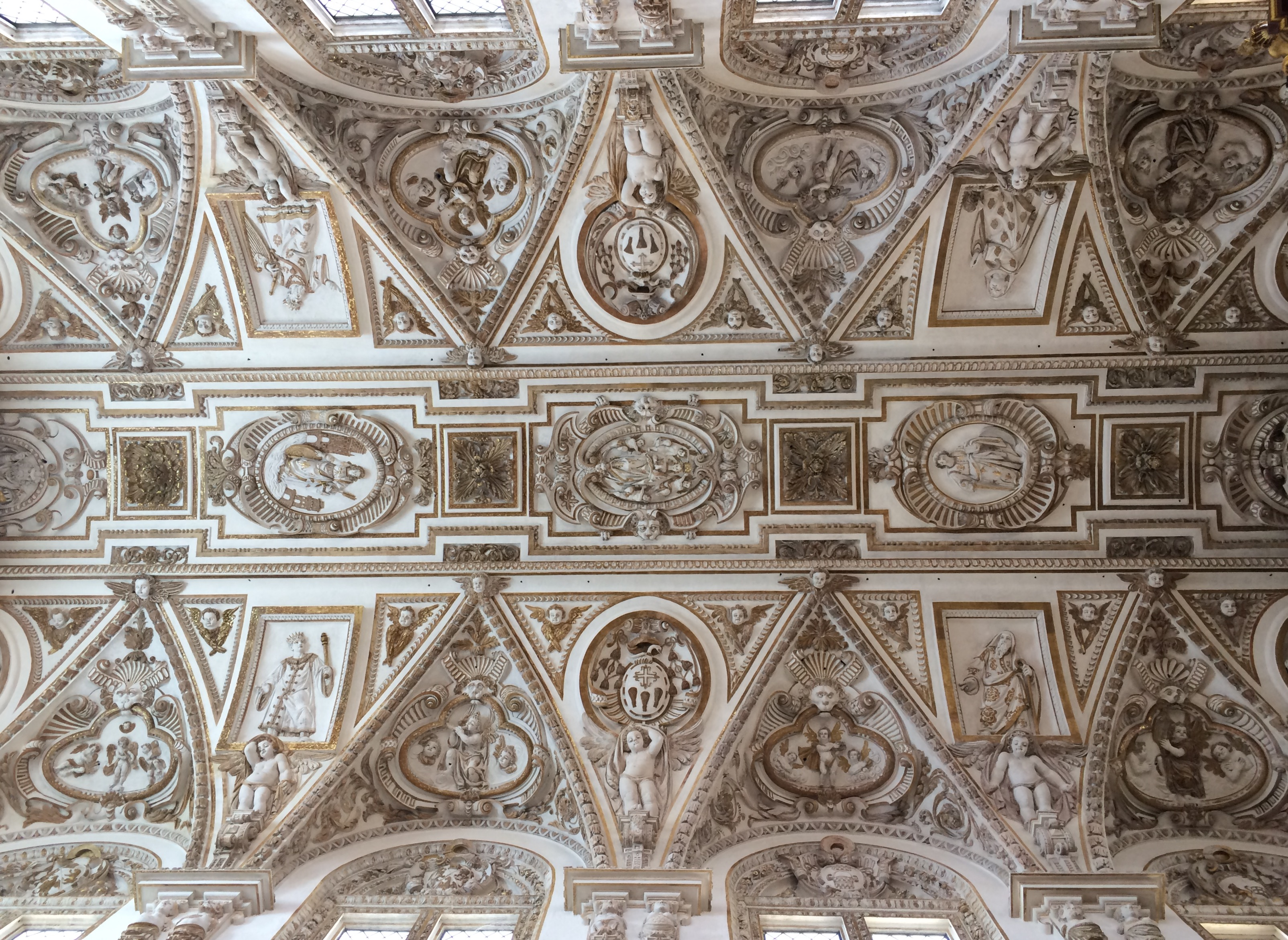
Details of the barrel vault ceiling over the choir

==== Main altar ====
The altar of the Capilla Mayor was begun in 1618 and designed in a Mannerist style by Alonso Matías. After 1627 the works were taken over by Juan de Aranda Salazar, and the altar was finished in 1653. The sculpting was executed by the artists Sebastián Vidal and Pedro Freile de Guevara. The original paintings of the altar were executed by Cristóbal Vela Cobo but they were replaced in 1715 by the current paintings by Antonio Palomino. The altar consists of three vertical "aisles" flanked by columns with composite capitals. The central aisle houses the tabernacle (executed by Pedro Freile de Guevara) at its base, while its upper half is occupied by a canvas of the Assumption. The two aisles on the side contain four more canvases depicting four martyrs: Saint Acisclus and Saint Victoria on the bottom halves and Saint Pelagius and Saint Flora in the upper halves. The upper canvases are flanked by sculptures of Saint Peter and Saint Paul, and the central portion is topped by a relief sculpture of God the Father.

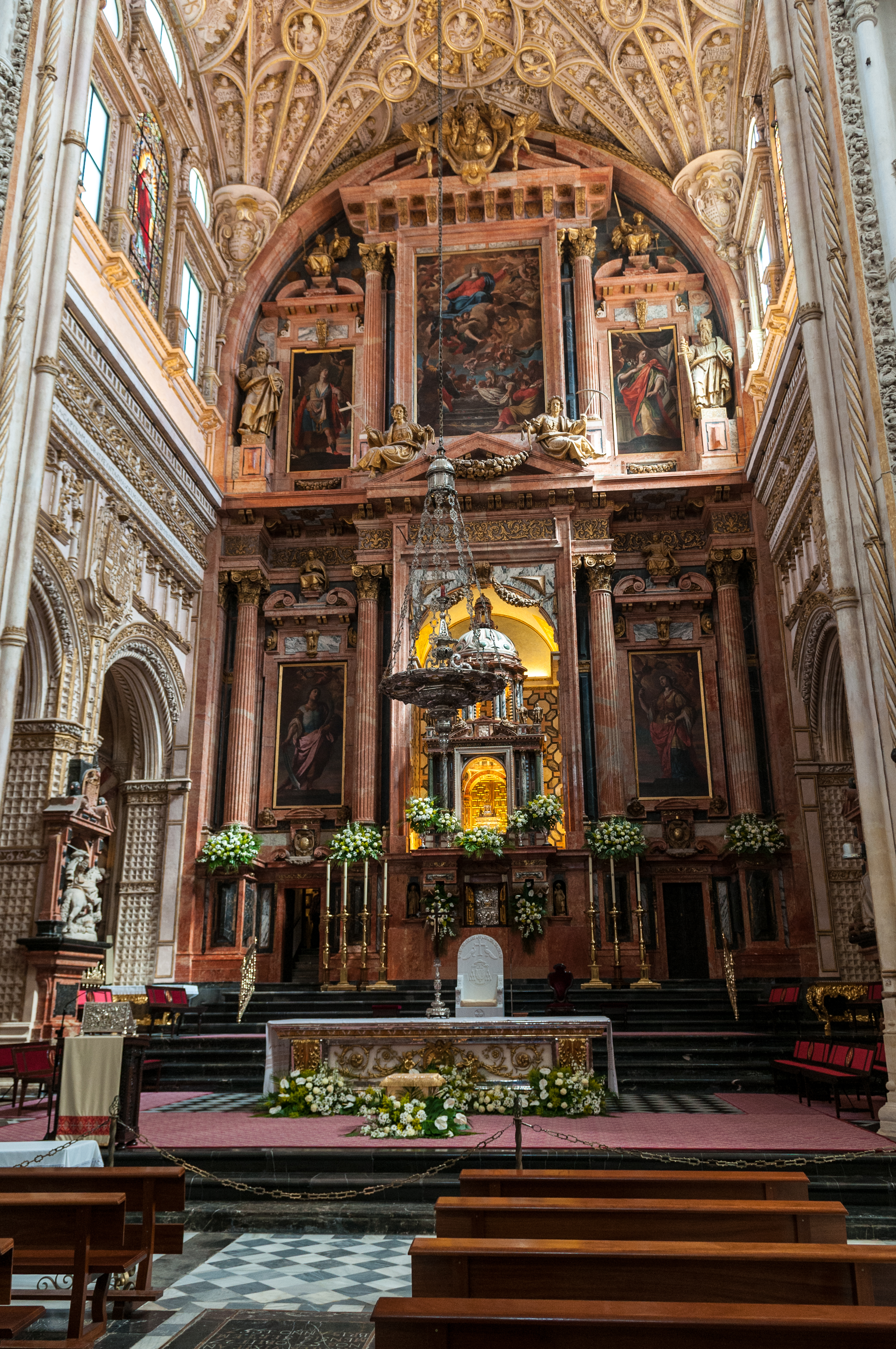
The main altar

The tabernacle (center) and the lower region of the altar

The upper region of the altar, with the central canvas of the Assumption

==== Choir stalls ====
The choir stalls, located across from the altar, were crafted from 1748 to 1757 and were executed by Pedro Duque Cornejo. The ensemble was carved mainly out of mahogany wood and features a row of 30 upper seats and a row of 23 lower seats, all intricately decorated with carvings, including a series of iconographic scenes. At the centre of the ensemble on the west side is a large episcopal throne, commissioned in 1752, that resembles the design of an altarpiece. The lower part of the thrones has three seats, but the most significant element is the upper part which features a life-size representation of the Ascension of Jesus. The last figure which stands above the summit of the ensemble is a sculpture of the Archangel Raphael.

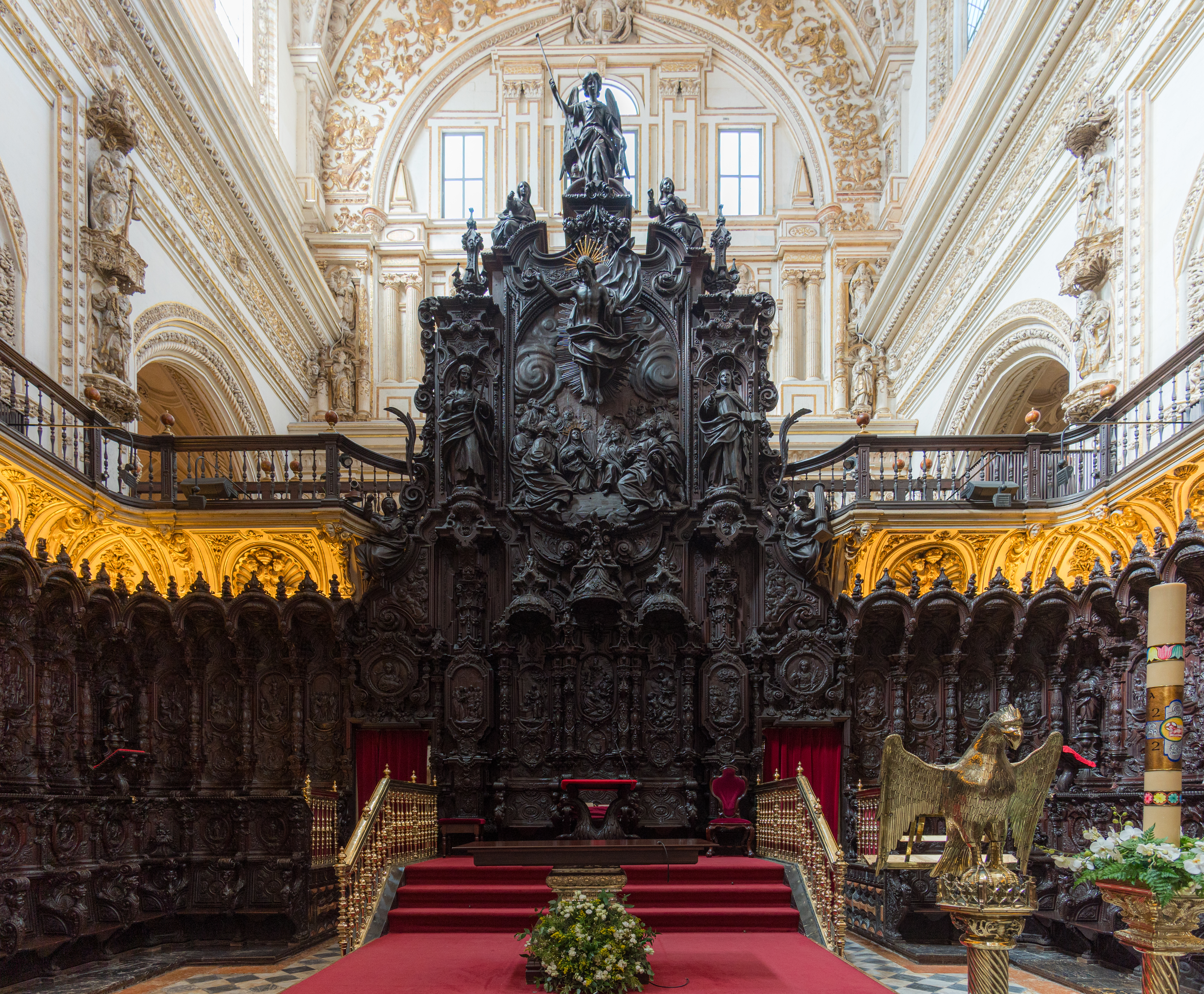
The choir

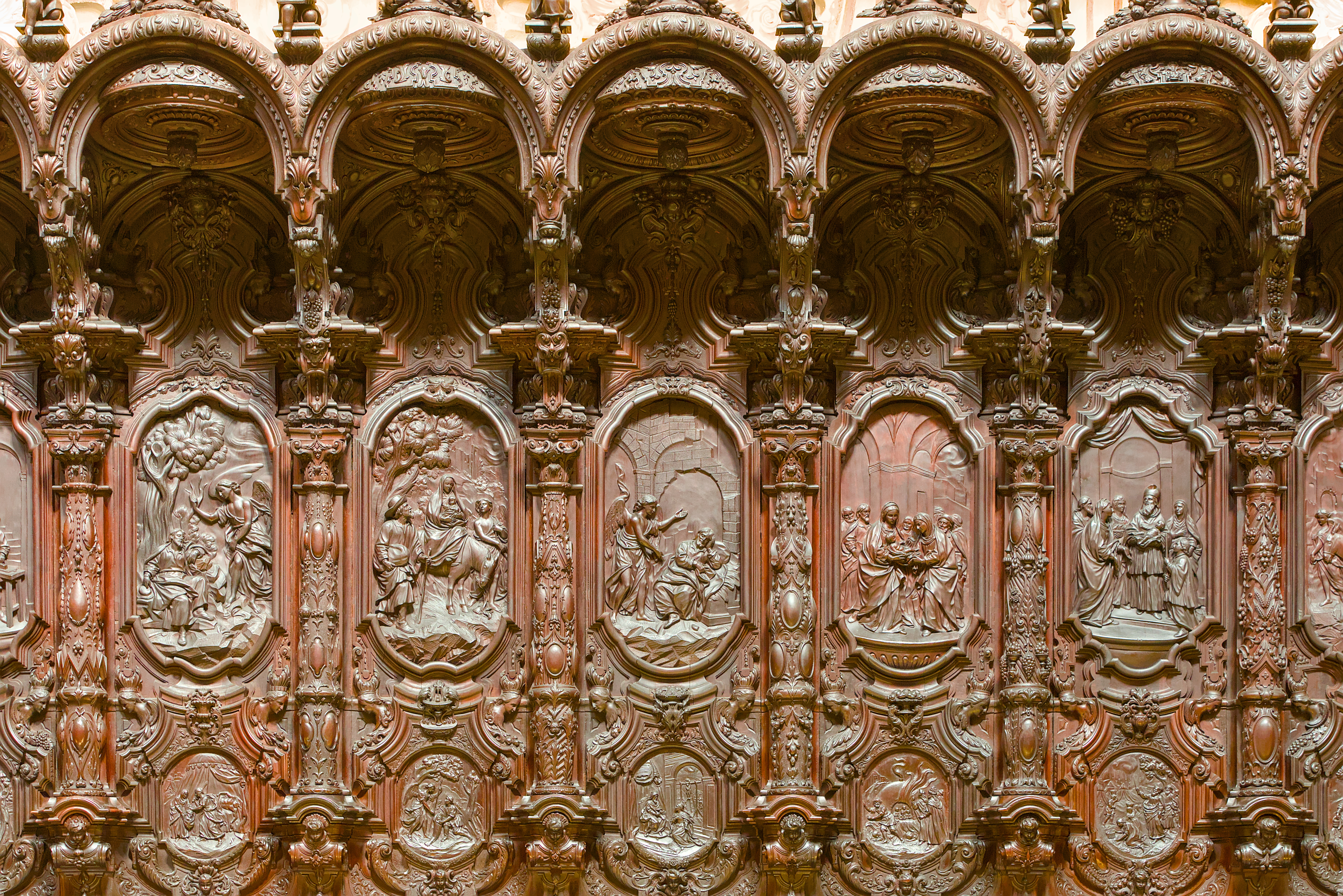
View of the seats on the upperrow

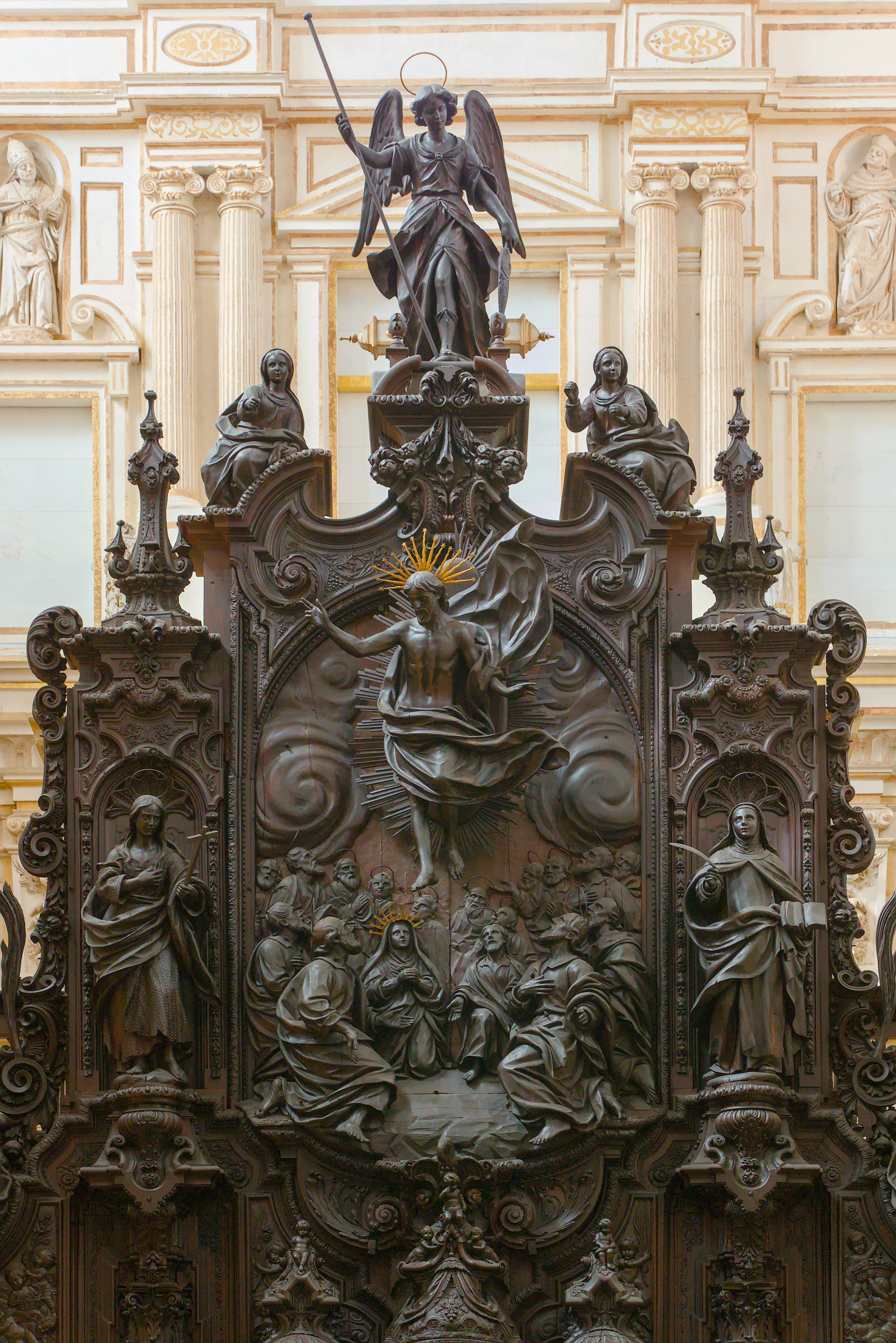
The upper part of the episcopal throne of the choir, featuring a life-size representation of the Ascension

=== List of chapels ===
West wall, from north to south:

- Capilla de San Ambrosio
- Capilla de San Agustín
- Capilla de Nuestra Señora de las Nieves y San Vicente Mártir
- Capilla de los Santos Simón y Judas de la Mezquita-Catedral de Córdoba
- Capilla de la Concepción de Salizanes o del Santísimo Sacramento
- Capilla de San Antonio Abad
- Capilla de la Trinidad
- Capilla de San Acacio
- Capilla de San Pedro y San Lorenzo
- Museo de San Vicente

South wall, from west to east:

- Capilla de San Bartolomé
- Capilla de Santa Teresa
- Capilla de Santa Inés
- Capilla del Sagrario

East wall, from north to south:

- Capilla de San Antonio de Padua
- Capilla de San Marcos, Santa Ana y San Juan Bautista
- Capilla de San Mateo y Limpia Concepción de Nuestra Señora
- Capilla de San Juan Bautista
- Capilla de Santa Marina, de San Matías y del Baptisterio
- Capilla de San Nicolás de Bari
- Capilla de la Expectación
- Capilla del Espíritu Santo
- Capilla de la Concepción Antigua
- Capilla de San José
- Capilla de la Natividad de Nuestra Señora
- Capilla de Santa María Magdalena

North wall, from west to east:

- Capilla de San Eulogio
- Capilla de San Esteban
- Capilla de Nuestra Señora del Mayor Dolor
- Capilla de la Virgen de la Antigua
- Capilla de San Andrés
- Capilla de la Epifanía
- Capilla de Nuestra Señora del Rosario
- Capilla de las Benditas Ánimas del Purgatorio
- Capilla de los Santos Varones
- Capilla de Santa Francisca Romana y Santa Úrsula
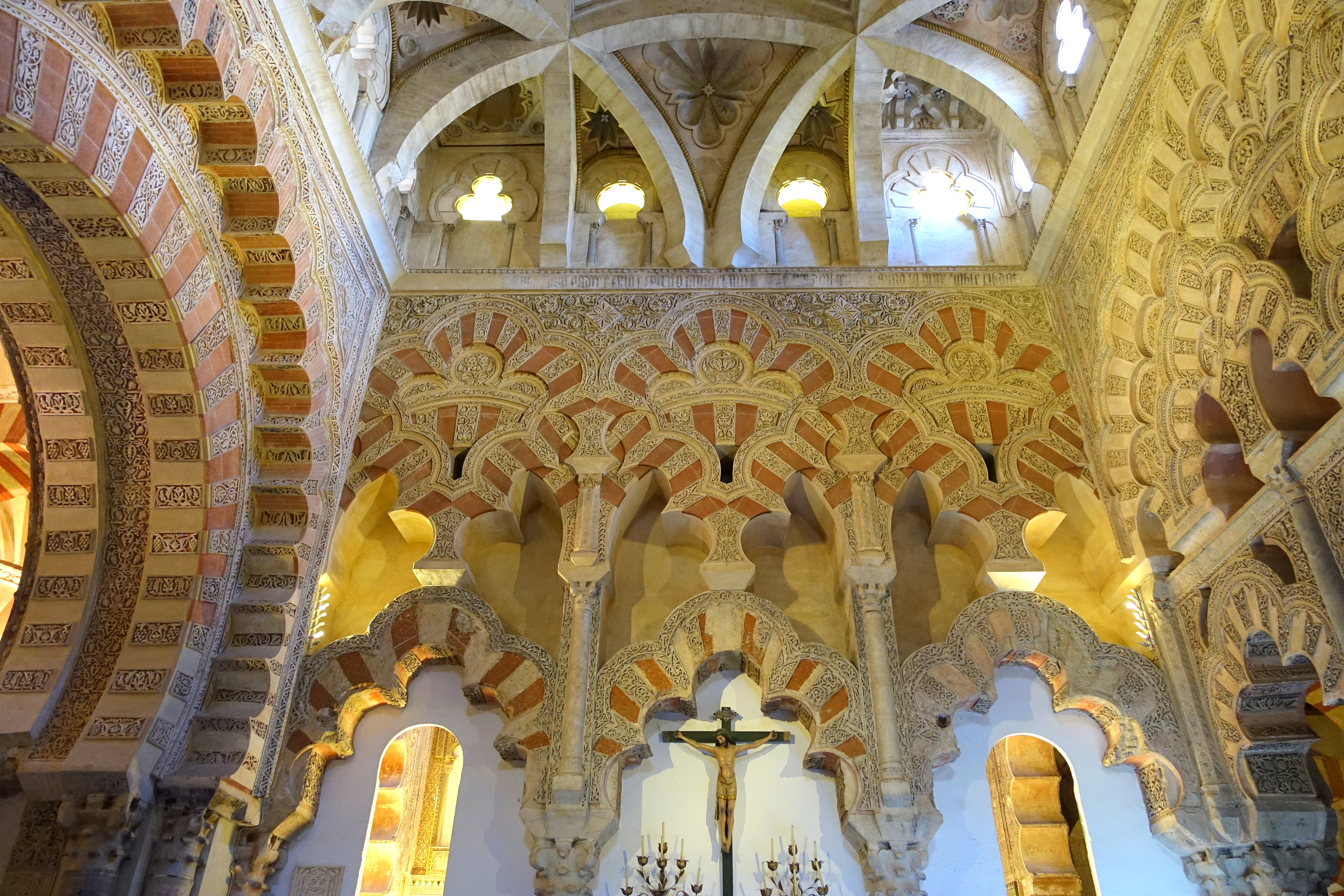
Capilla de Villaviciosa

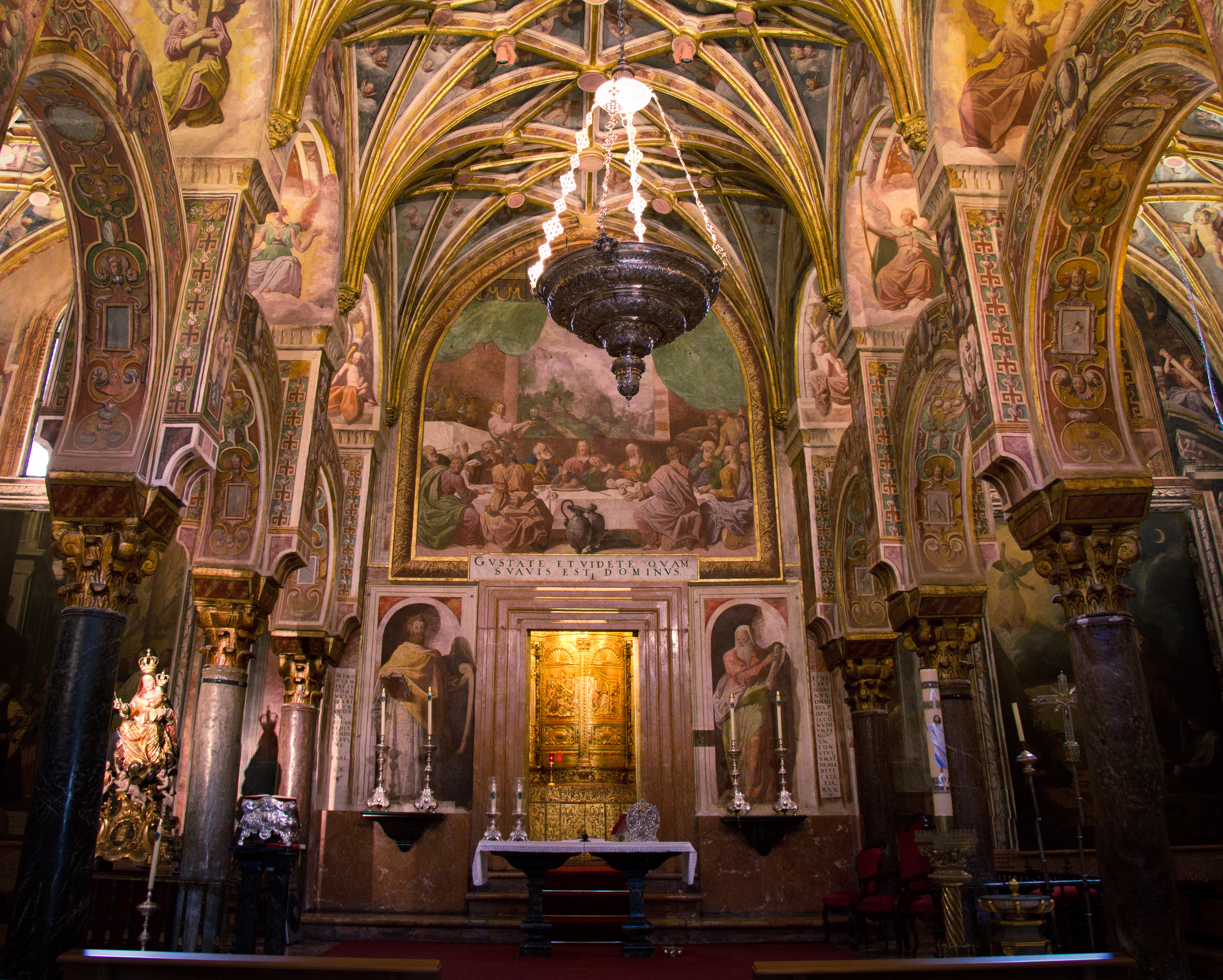
Capilla Sagrario

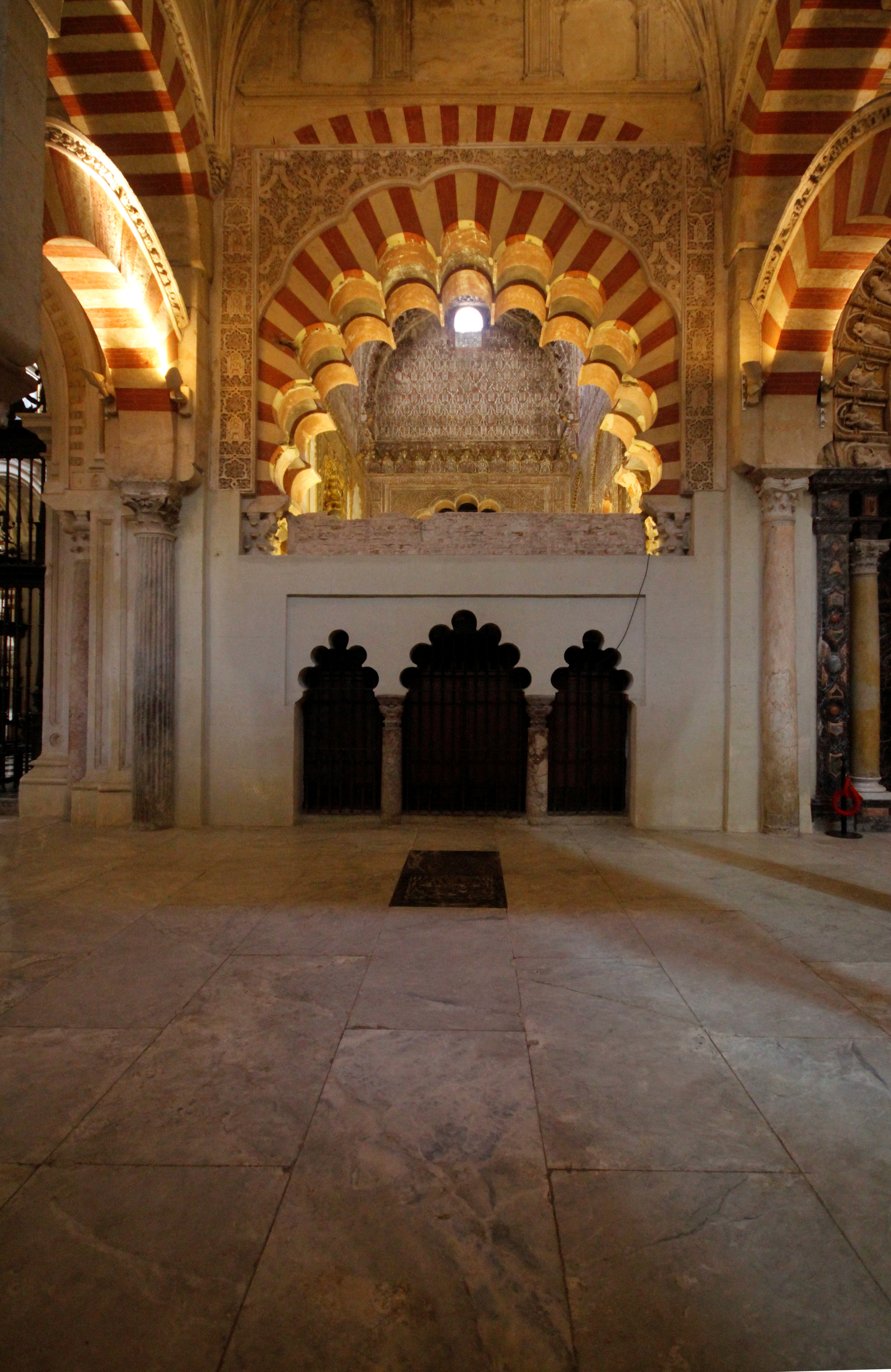
Capilla Real

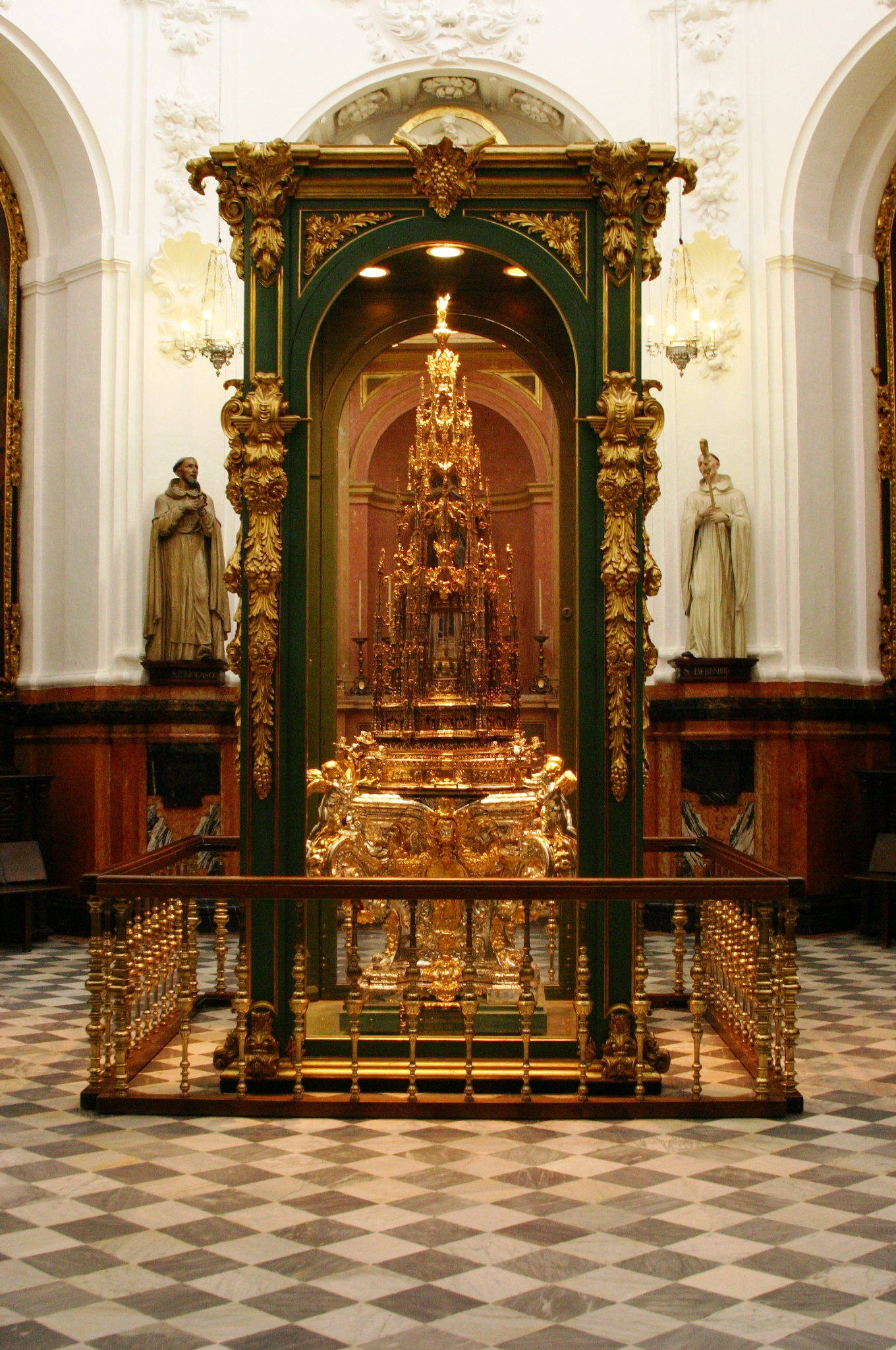
Capilla Teresa

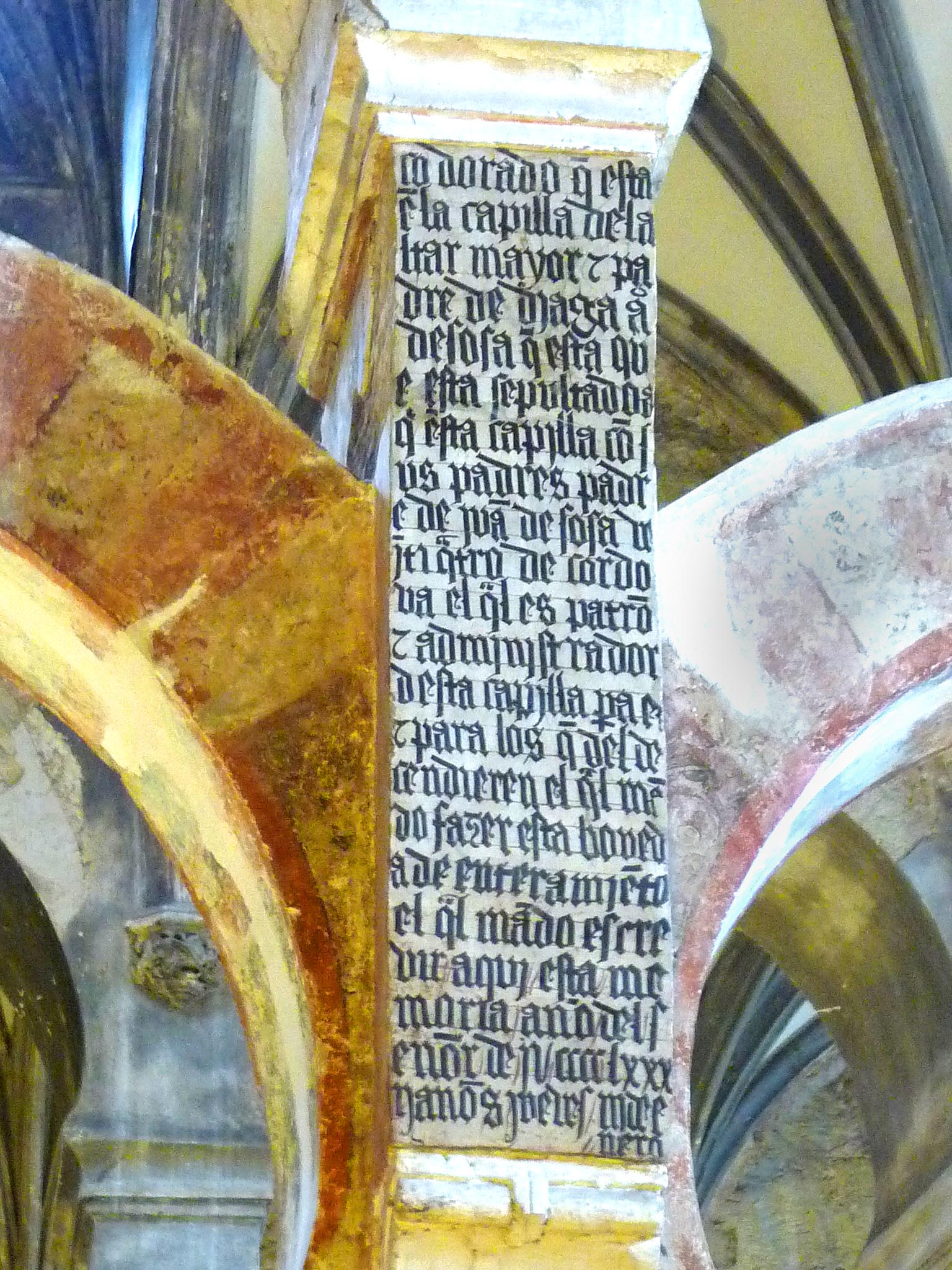
Capilla San Clemente

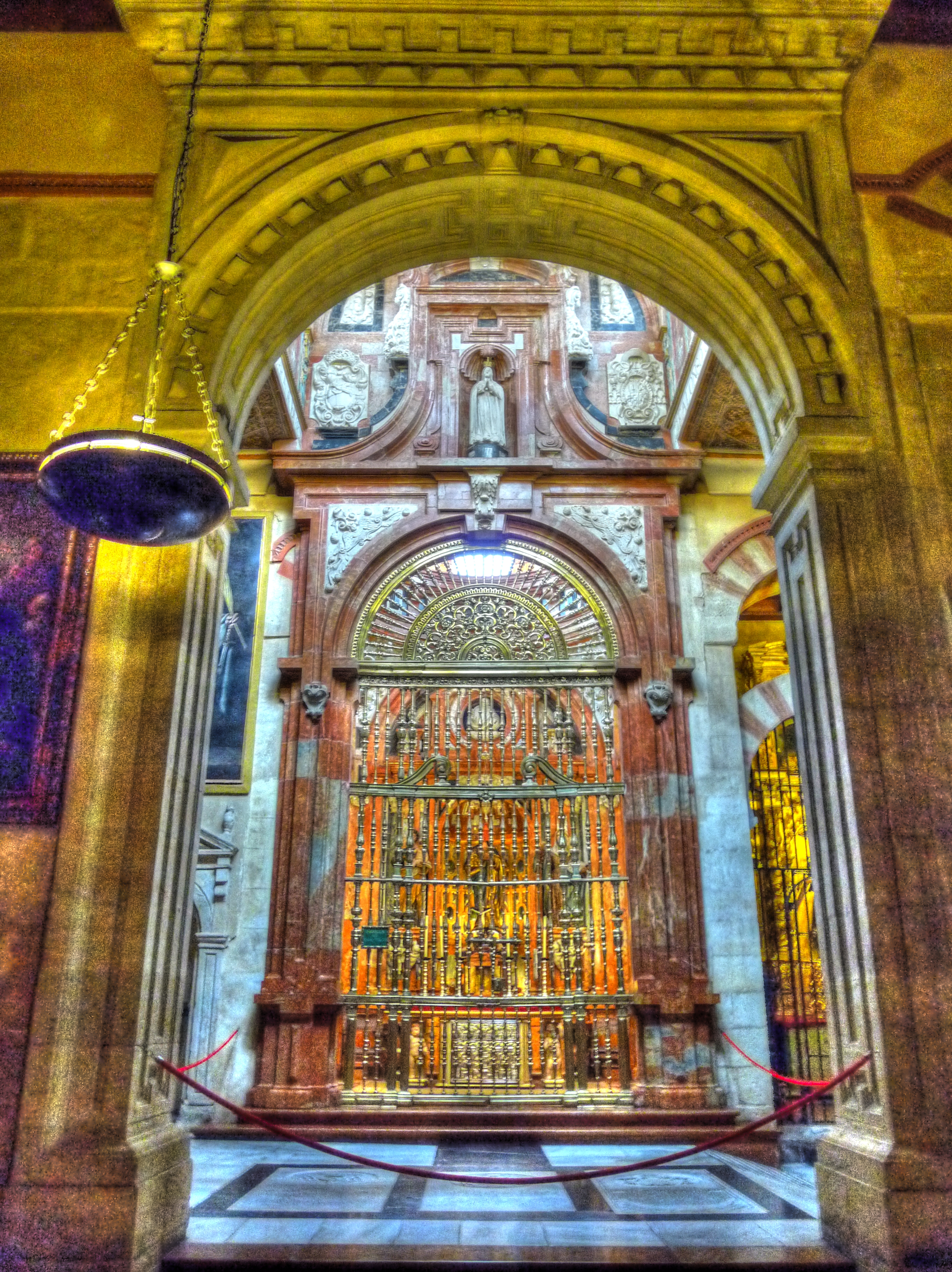
Capilla de la Concepción

=== Doors ===
==== Doors of the Islamic period ====
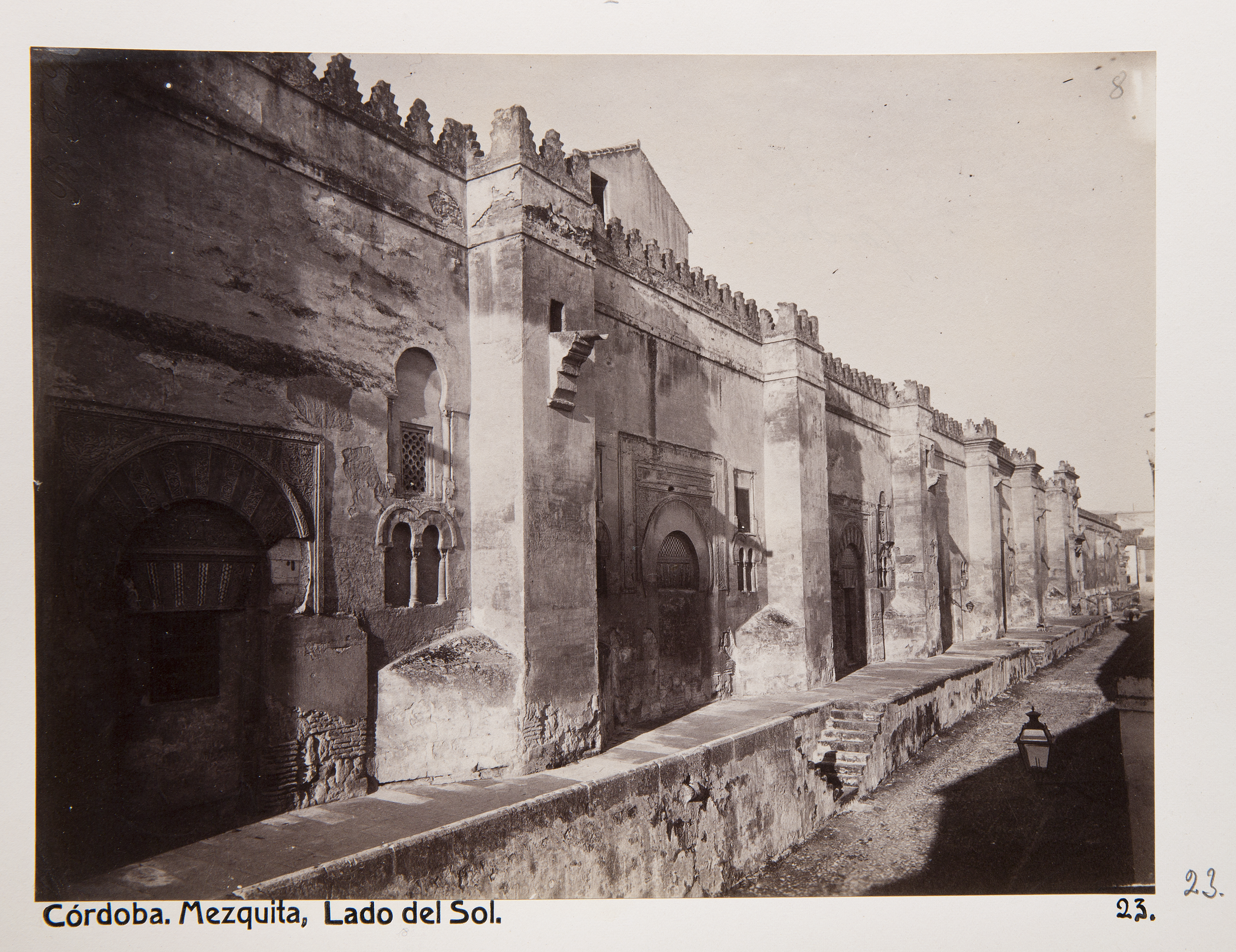
Doors on the eastern façade of the Mosque-Cathedral in 1895, prior to 20th-century restorations

The Puerta de San Esteban (formerly the Bab al-Wuzara in Arabic) is one of the oldest well-preserved and historically significant gateways of Moorish architecture. It was originally the gate by which the Muslim emir and his officials entered the mosque and it presumably existed since the mosque's first construction by Abd ar-Rahman I in the 8th century. However, its decoration was completed by Muhammad I in 855. Centuries of slow deterioration and restoration attempts have erased some elements of its decoration, but major original aspects of it remain. Its historical-architectural significance derives from being the earliest surviving example to display the classic ornamental features of Moorish gateways: a door topped by a horseshoe arch with voussoirs of alternating color, which in turn is framed by a rectangular alfiz.

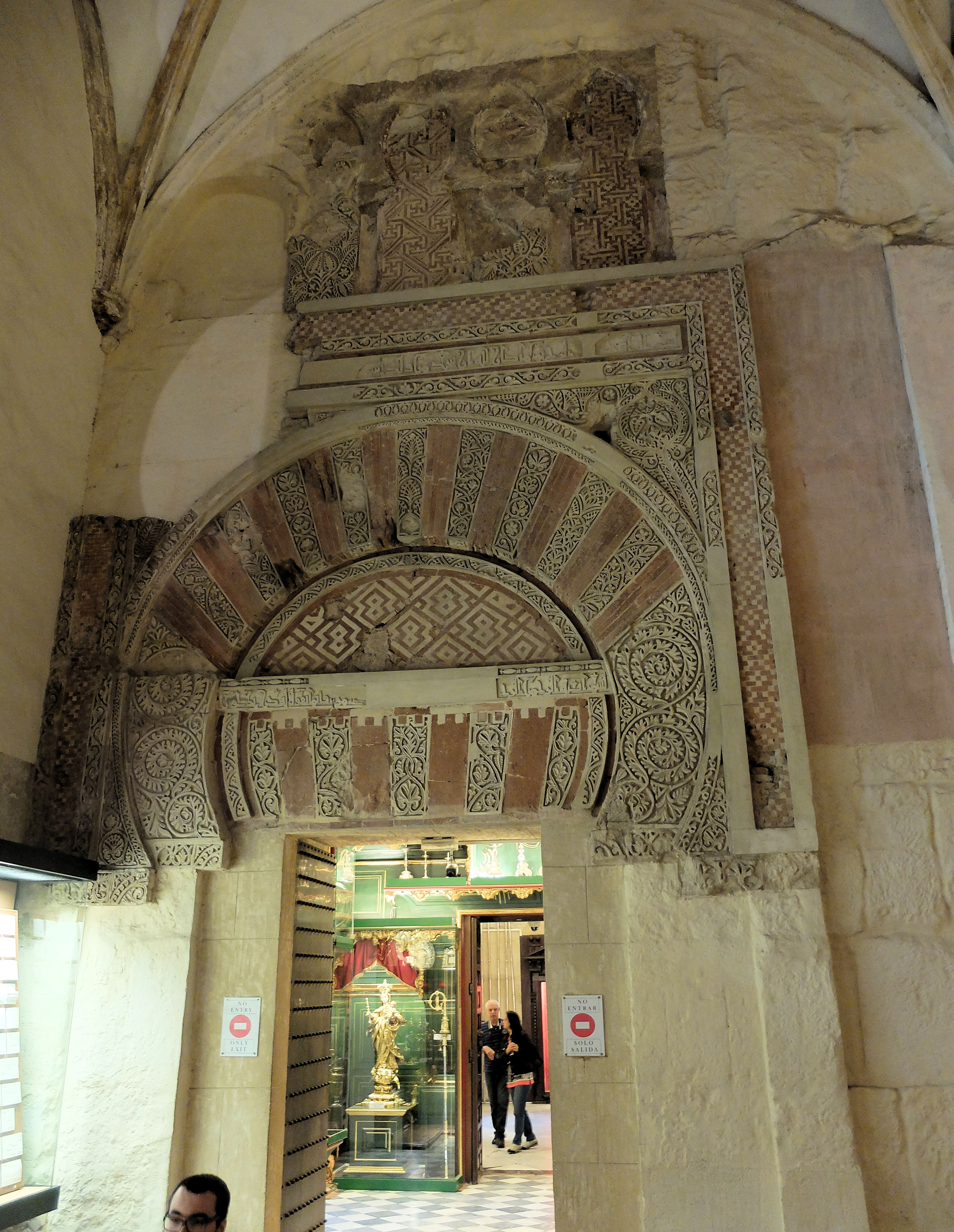
Remains of the Puerta del Chocolate (or del Punto), a former eastern gate of the mosque from Al-Hakam II's 10th-century expansion (prior to Al-Mansur's eastward extension of the building)

Many other gates were added over the course of subsequent expansions of the mosque. These later gates have even more elaborate decoration, particularly from the 10th century during Al-Hakam II's expansion (starting in 961), visible today on the western exterior façade of the former prayer hall. Al-Mansur's final expansion of the mosque a few decades later (starting in 987–988), which extended the mosque laterally to the east, copied the design of the earlier gates of Al-Hakam II's expansion. Al-Mansur's doors are visible on the building's current eastern façade. Some remains of the original eastern doors of Al-Hakam II's expansion, before Al-Mansur's displacement of the eastern wall, are still visible inside the mosque-cathedral today. The best-preserved example is the door popularly known as Puerta del Chocolate or Puerta del Punto, located next to the southern wall and serving today as the visitors' exit from the cathedral's treasury rooms, which was formerly a door to the mosque's treasury as well.

Many of the exterior gates have undergone various periods of decay and restoration. The most elaborate gates on the eastern wall today are in large part the work of 20th-century restorations. Many of the original Arabic inscriptions on these doors have nonetheless been preserved. Susana Calvo Capilla has noted that many of the inscriptions on the 10th-century gates have eschatological and proselytizing connotations, possibly reflecting a conscious rebuttal of heterodox religious currents that the authorities deemed threats at the time. Three of the doors, for example, include Qur'anic verses that deny Christian beliefs on the divinity of Christ.

==== Doors of the Christian period ====
After the mosque's conversion to a cathedral in 1236, Spanish Christian designs were increasingly added to new or existing gates. The small Postigo de la Leche ("Door of the Milk") on the west side of the building has Gothic details dating from 1475. Among the most notable monumental Christian-era portals are the Puerta de las Palmas, the Puerta de Santa Catalina, and the Puerta del Perdón.

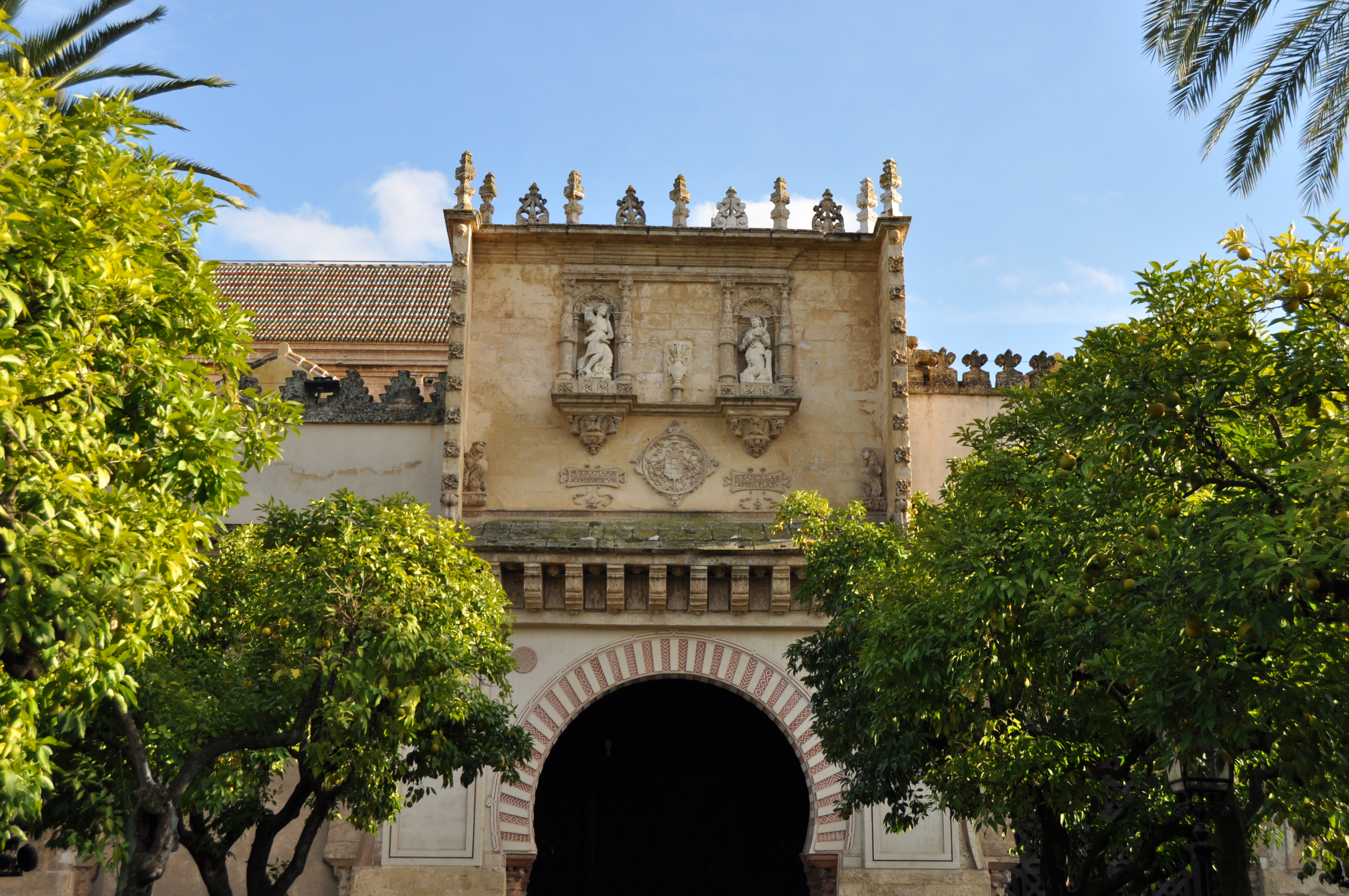
Puerta de las Palmas, seen from the Courtyard of the Oranges

The Puerta de las Palmas (Door of the Palms) is the grand ceremonial gate from the Courtyard of the Oranges to the cathedral's interior, built on what was originally a uniform façade of open arches leading to the former mosque's prayer hall. Originally called the Arco de Bendiciones (Arch of the Blessings), it was the setting for the ceremonial blessing of the royal flag, a ritual which was part of a Spanish monarch's coronation ceremony. Its current form dates from the restoration and remodelling done by Hernán Ruiz I in 1533, who created a plateresque façade above the doorway. The facade's statues depict the Annunciation while, unusually, the smaller figures in the lower corners depict mythological creatures.

Holy Week procession by the door of Santa Catalina

The Puerta de Santa Catalina (Door of Saint Catherine) is the main eastern entrance to the Courtyard of the Oranges. Its name referred to the presence of a nearby Convent of Saint Catherine. Its current appearance dates from the work of Hernán Ruiz II, who took over work on the cathedral in 1547 after the passing of his father (Hernán Ruiz I). The gate has a Renaissance façade on its exterior: the doorway is flanked by two columns and is surmounted by a serliana-style composition of columns forming three alcoves topped by a curved lintel. Within the three alcoves are the remains of three murals depicting Saint Catherine (Santa Catalina), Saint Acisclus (San Acisclo) and Saint Victoria (Santa Victoria).

The Puerta del Perdón (Door of Forgiveness) is one of the most ritually important doors of the cathedral, located at the base of the bell tower and directly opposite the Puerta de las Palmas. A gate existed here since the Islamic period; its location is aligned with the mihrab of the mosque and with the central axis of the building before Al-Mansur's expansion. Its first reconstruction in the Christian period of the building dates to 1377, but it has been modified several times since, notably by Sebastián Vidal in 1650. The faded mural paintings inside the blind arches above the outer doorway include a depiction of Our Lady of the Assumption in the middle, with Saint Michel and Saint Raphael on the sides.

==== List of doors ====
West façade, along Calle Torrijos, north to south:

- Postigo de la leche
- Puerta de los Deanes
- Puerta de San Esteban
- Puerta de San Miguel
- Puerta del Espíritu Santo
- Postigo del Palacio
- Puerta de San Ildefonso
- Puerta del Sabat
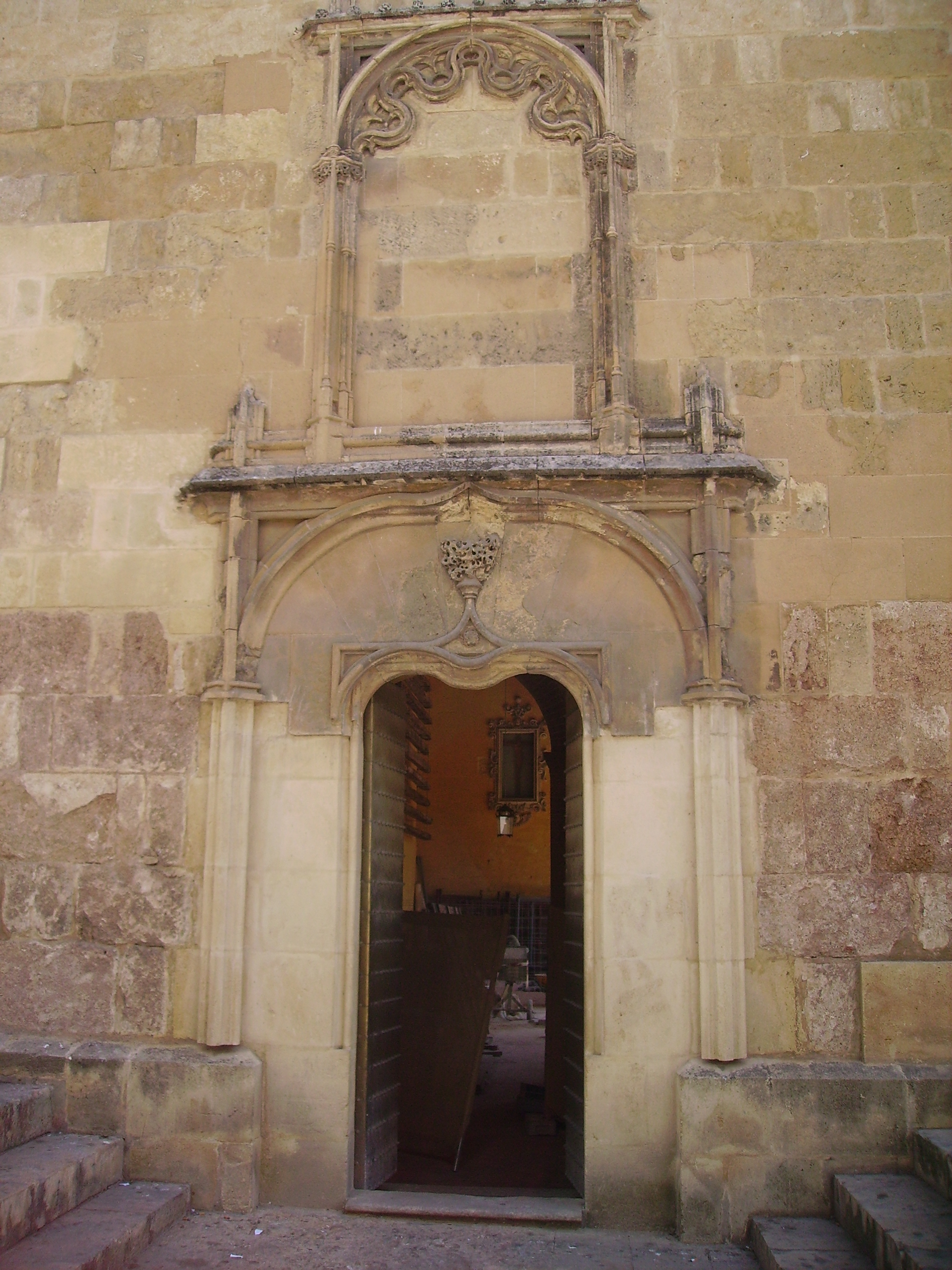
Postigo de la Leche

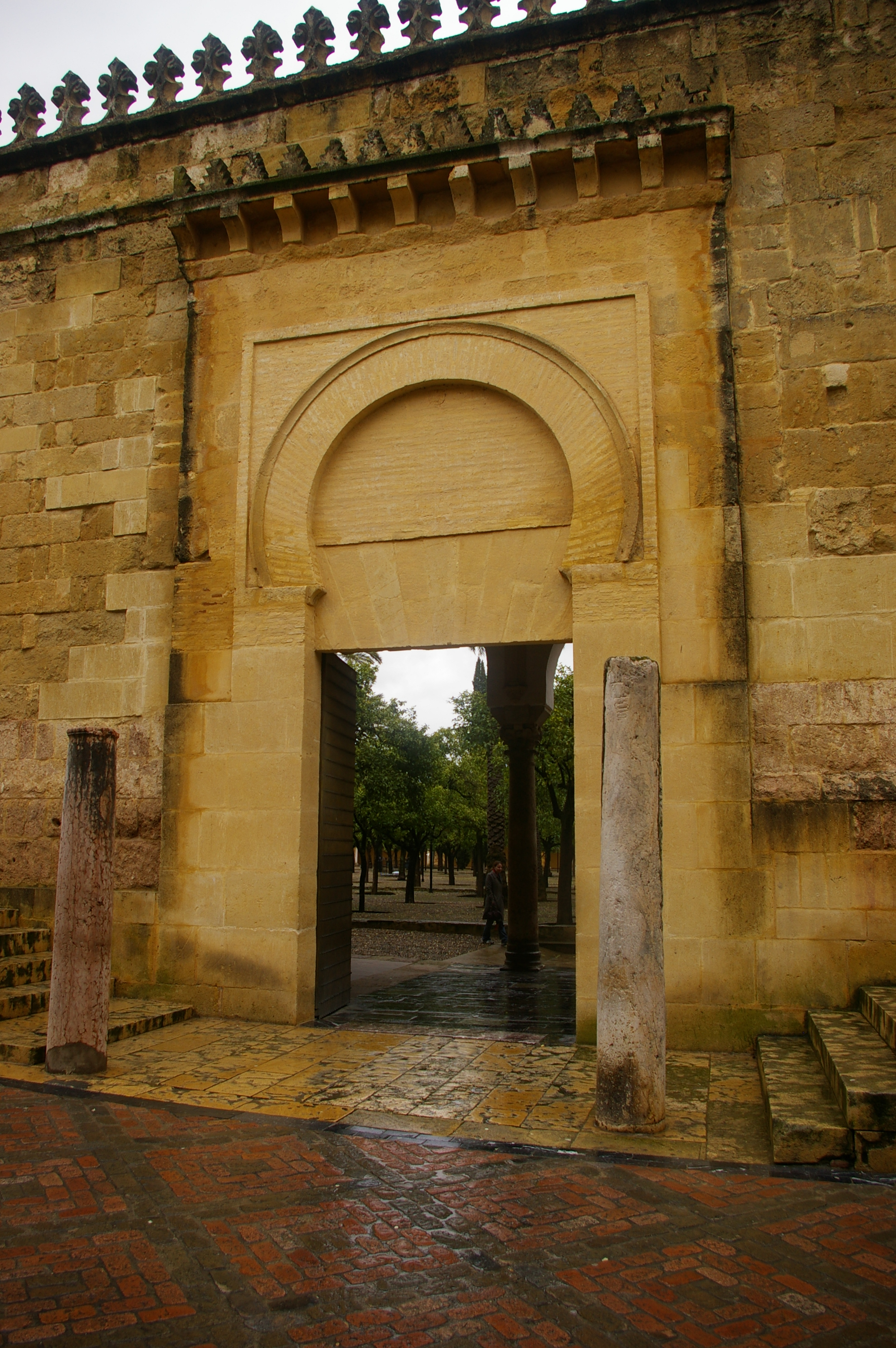
Puerta de los Deanes

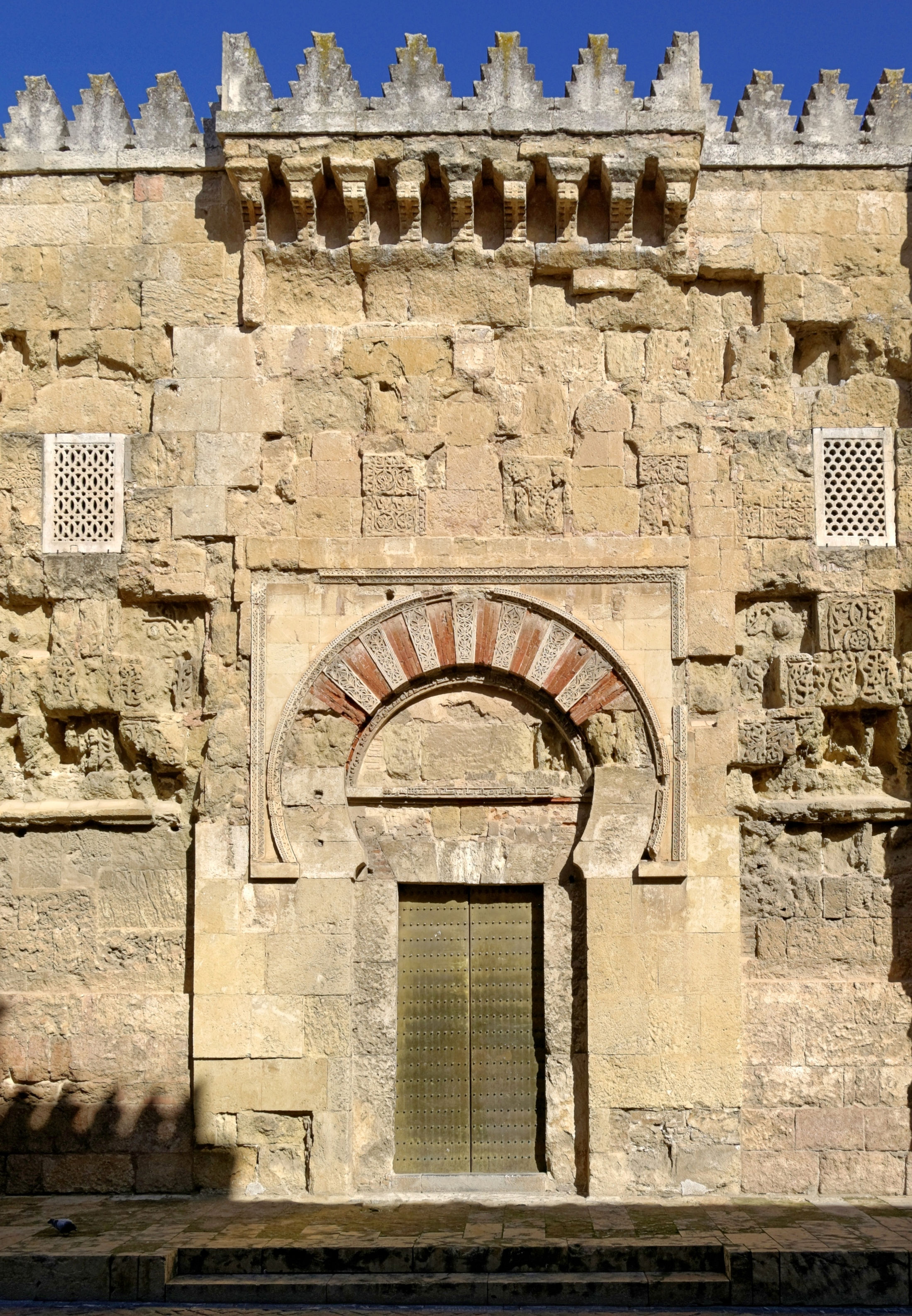
Puerta de San Esteban

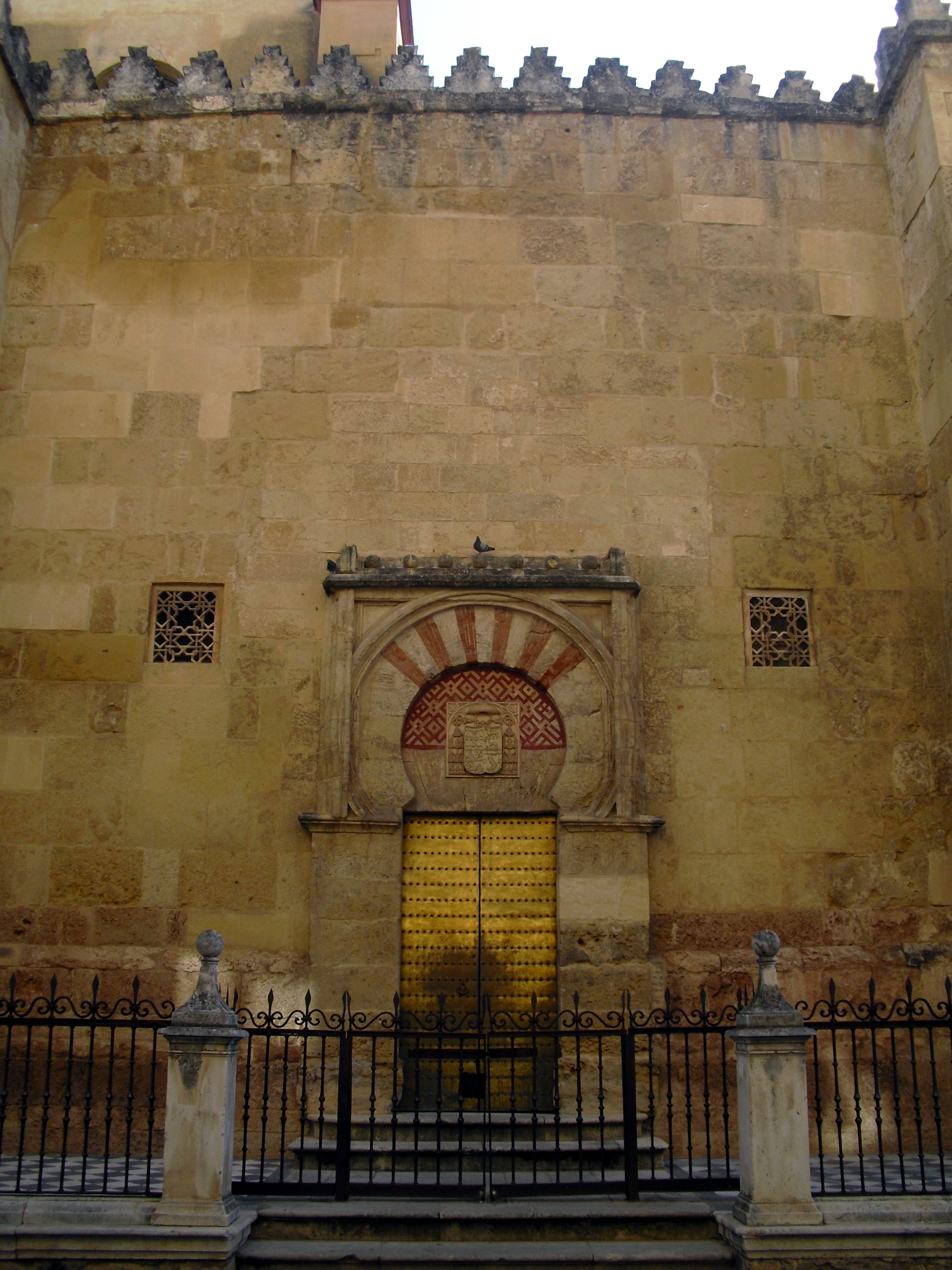
Puerta de San Miguel

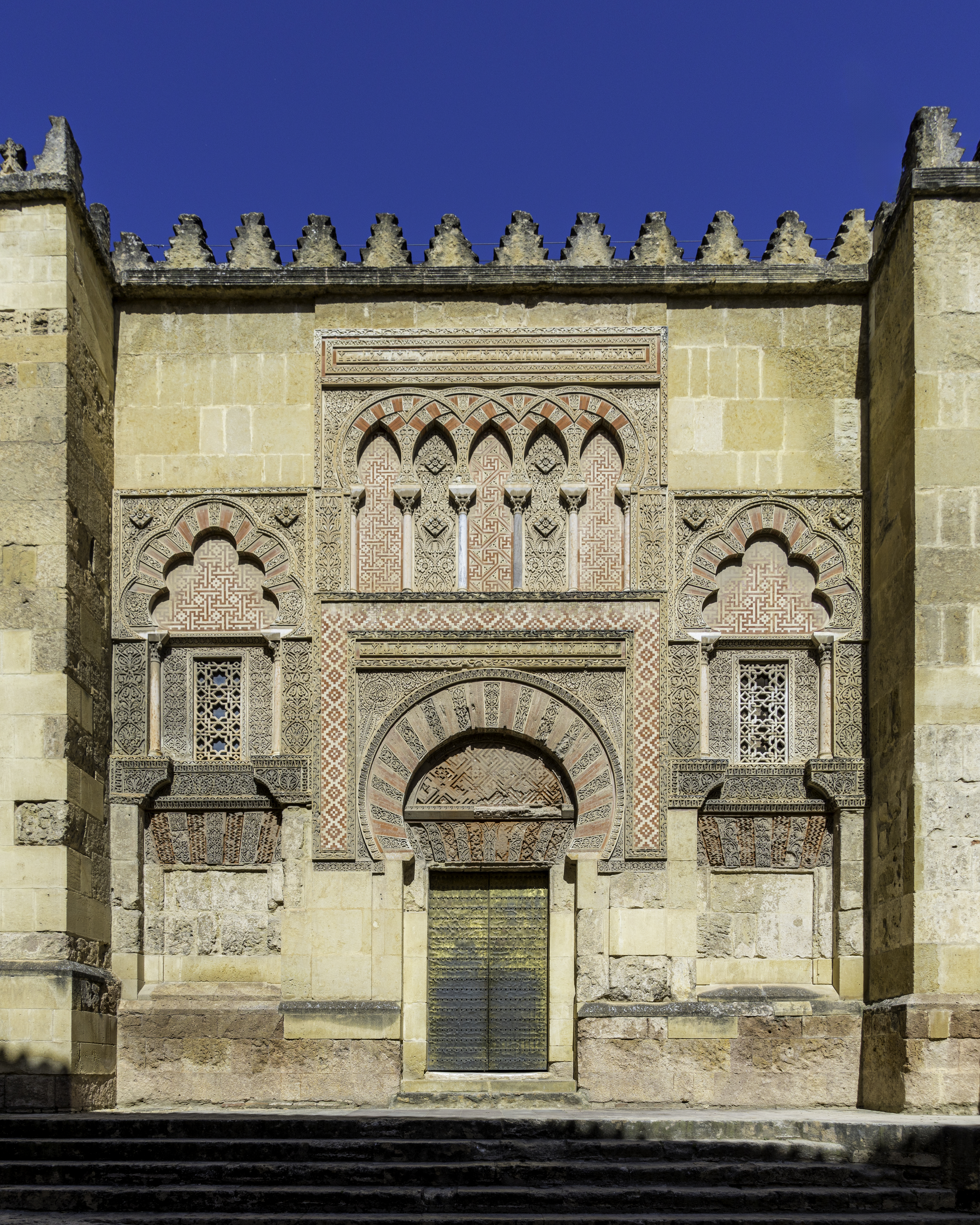
Puerta del Espíritu Santo

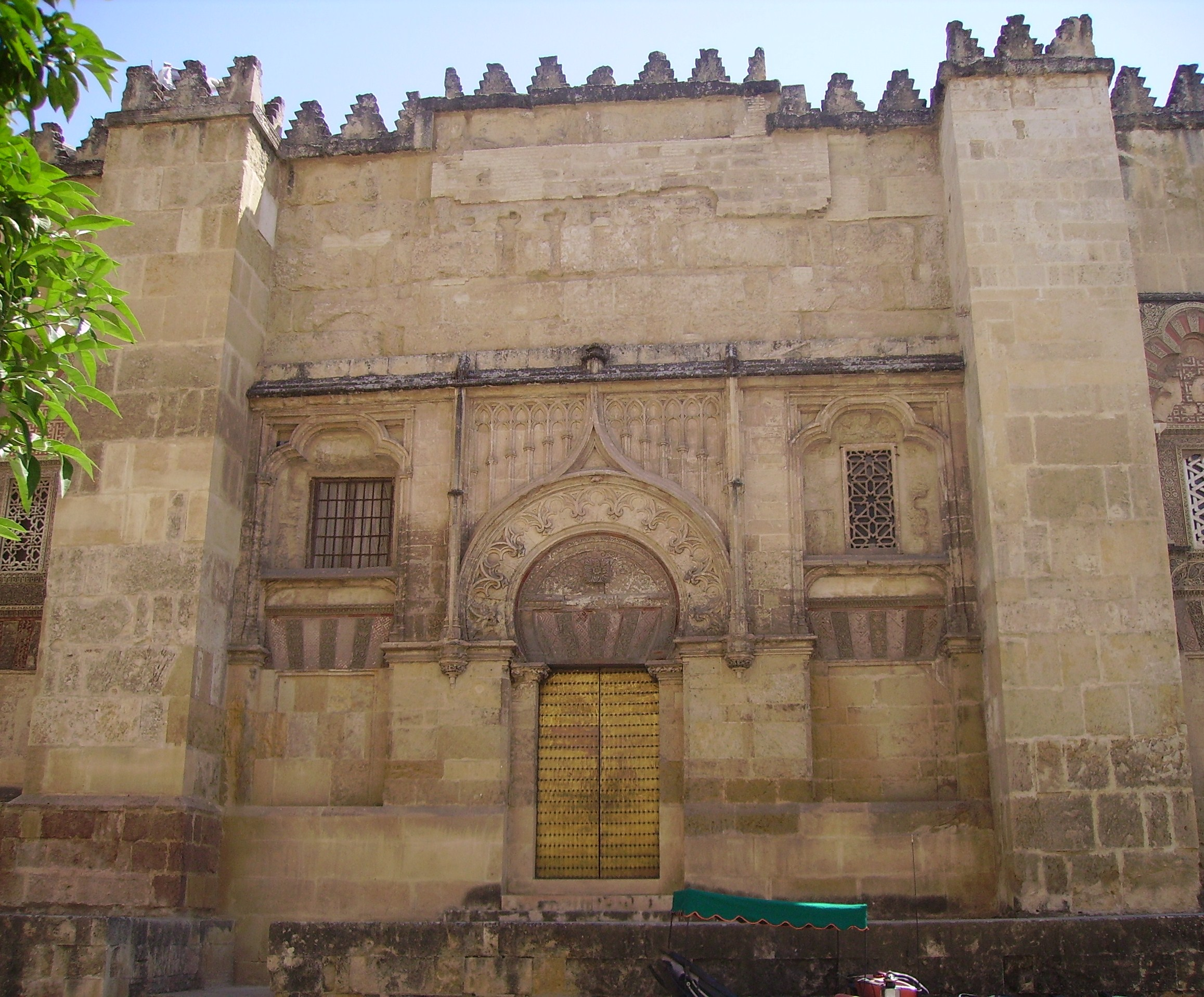
Postigo del Palacio

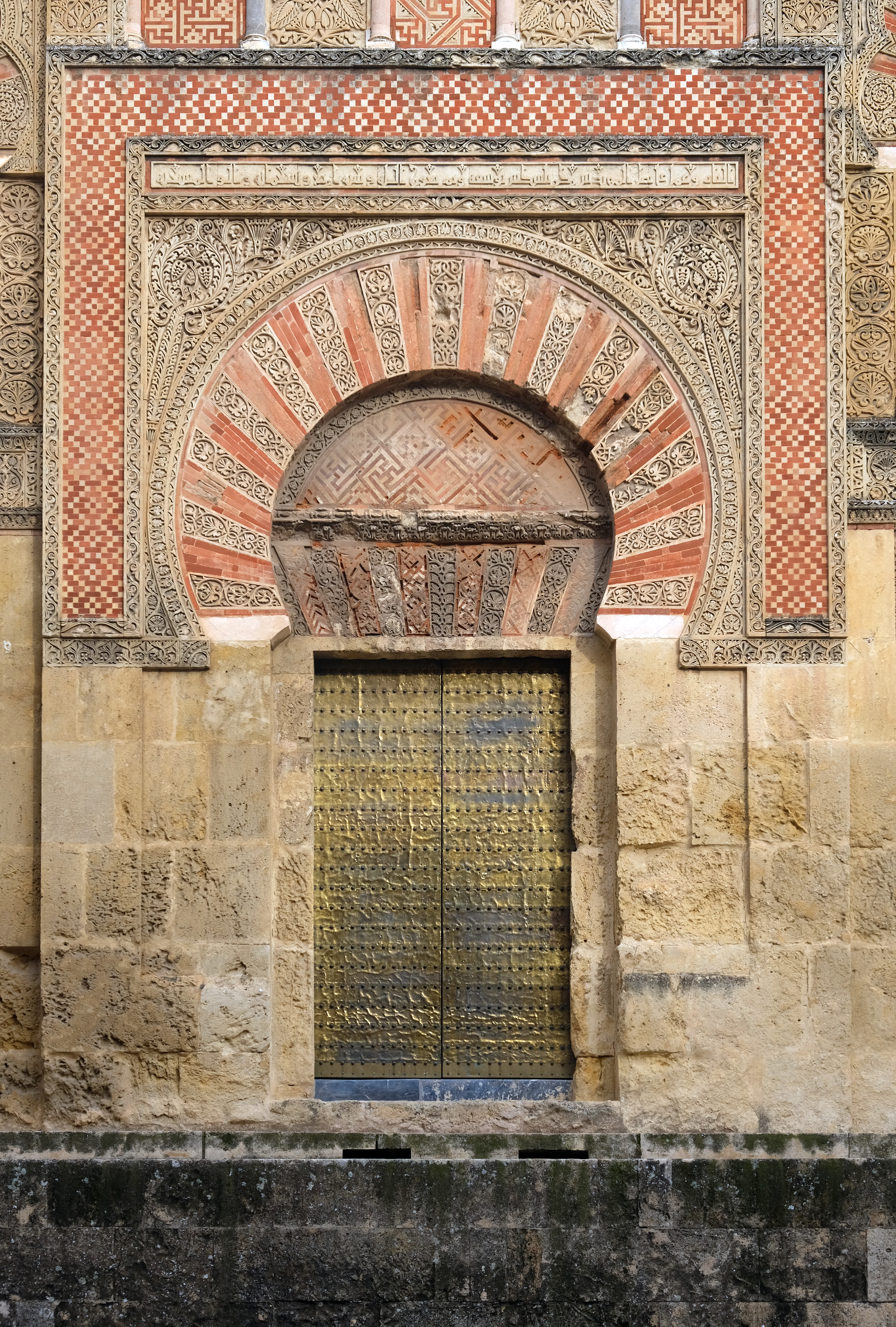
Puerta de San Ildefonso

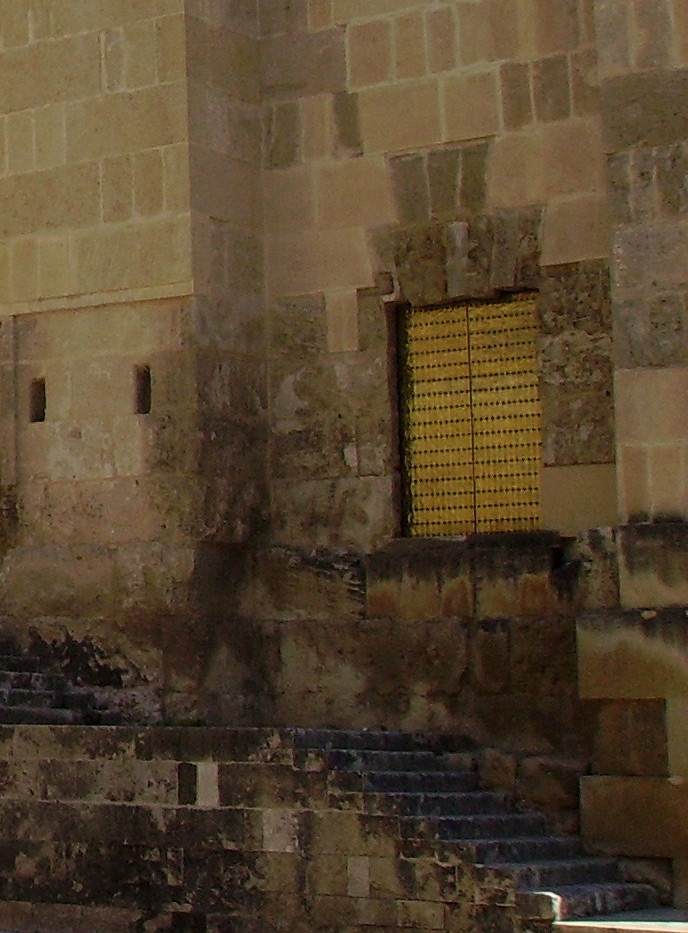
Puerta del Sabat

East façade, along Calle del Magistrado González Francés, north to south:

- Puerta de la Grada Redonda
- Fuente de Santa Catalina
- Puerta de Santa Catalina
- Puerta de San Juan
- Puerta del Baptisterio
- Puerta de San Nicolás
- Puerta de la Concepción Antigua
- Puerta de San José
- Puerta del Sagrario
- Puerta de Jerusalén
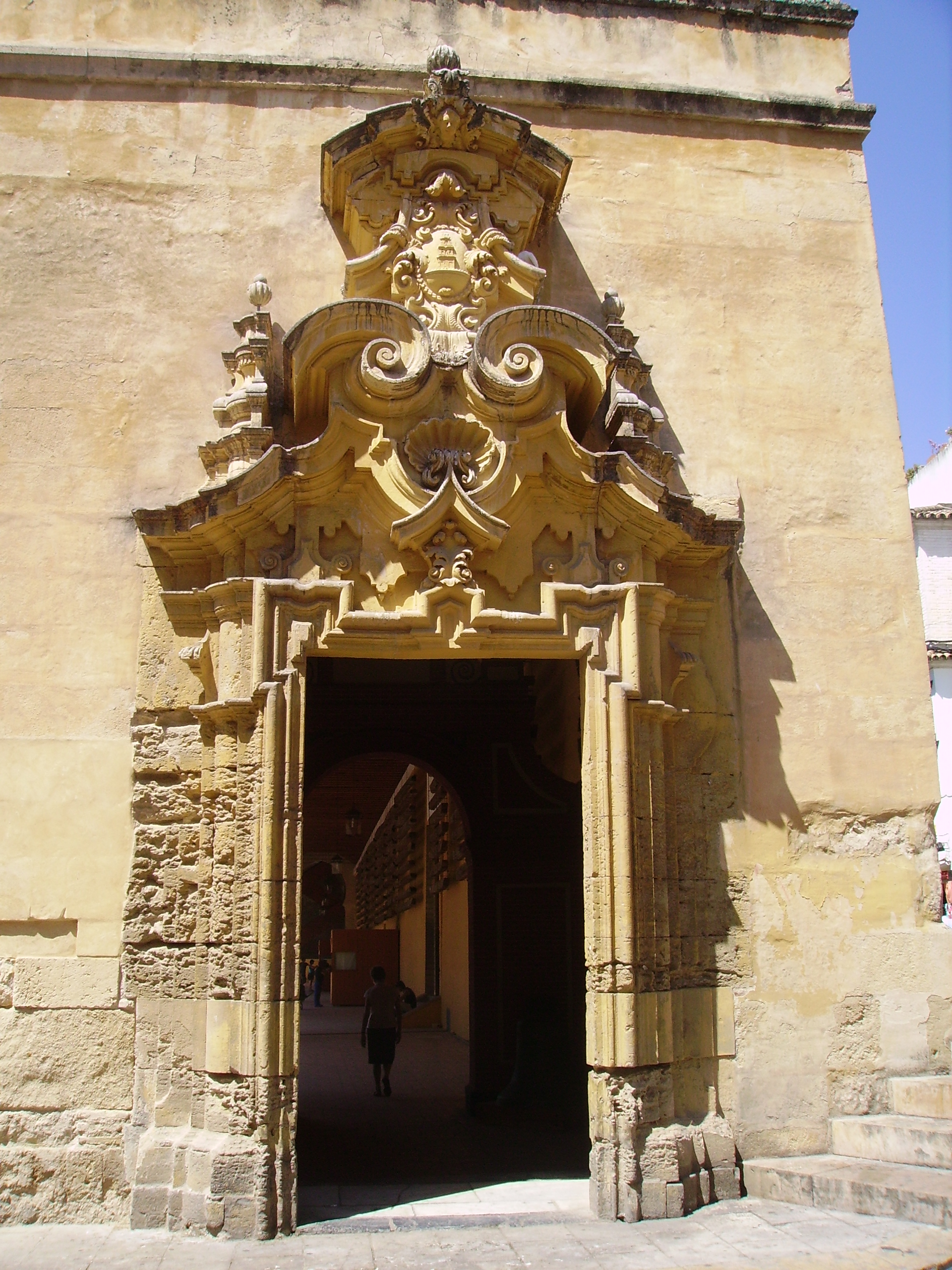
Puerta de la Grada Redonda

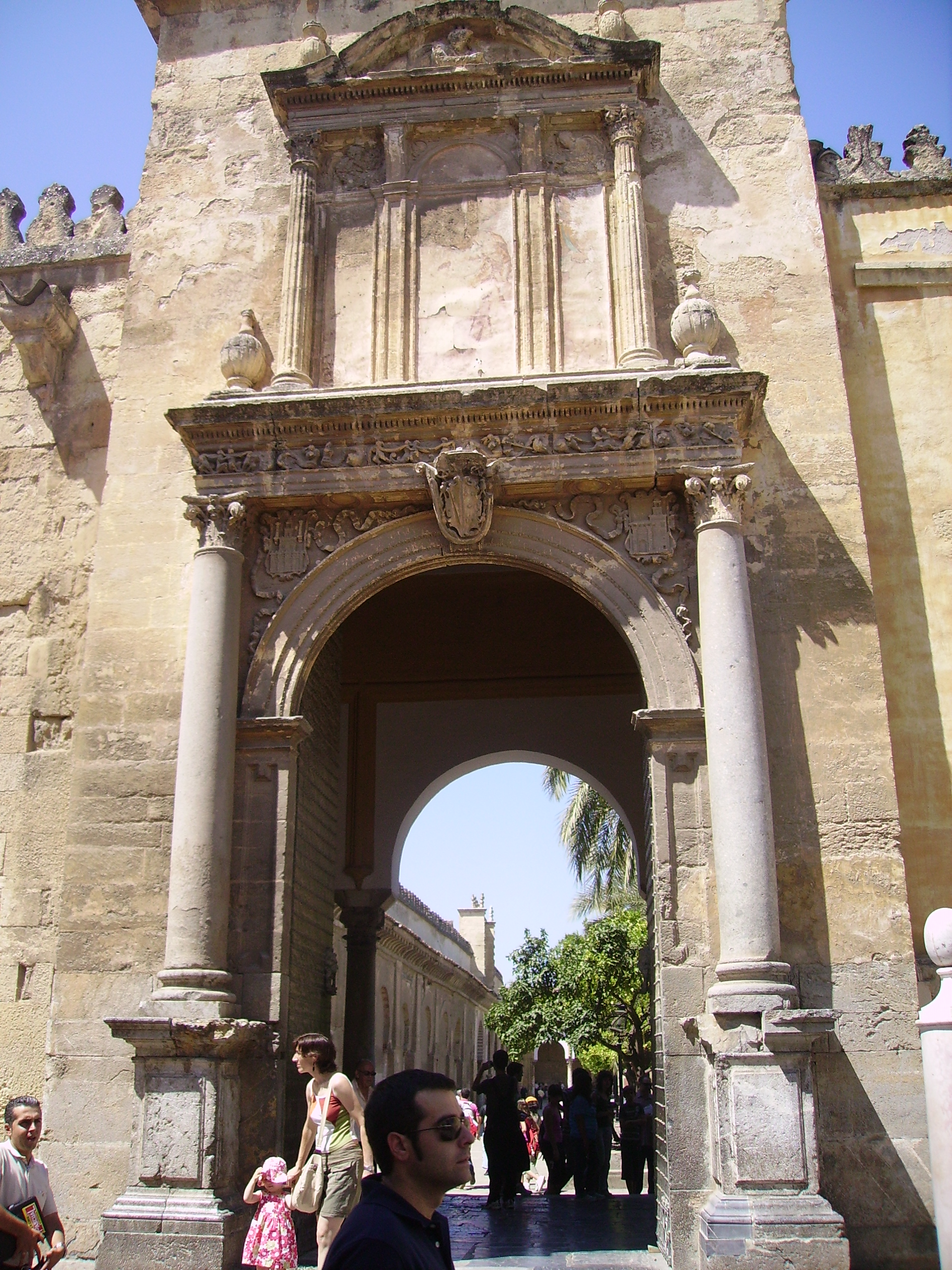
Puerta de Santa Catalina

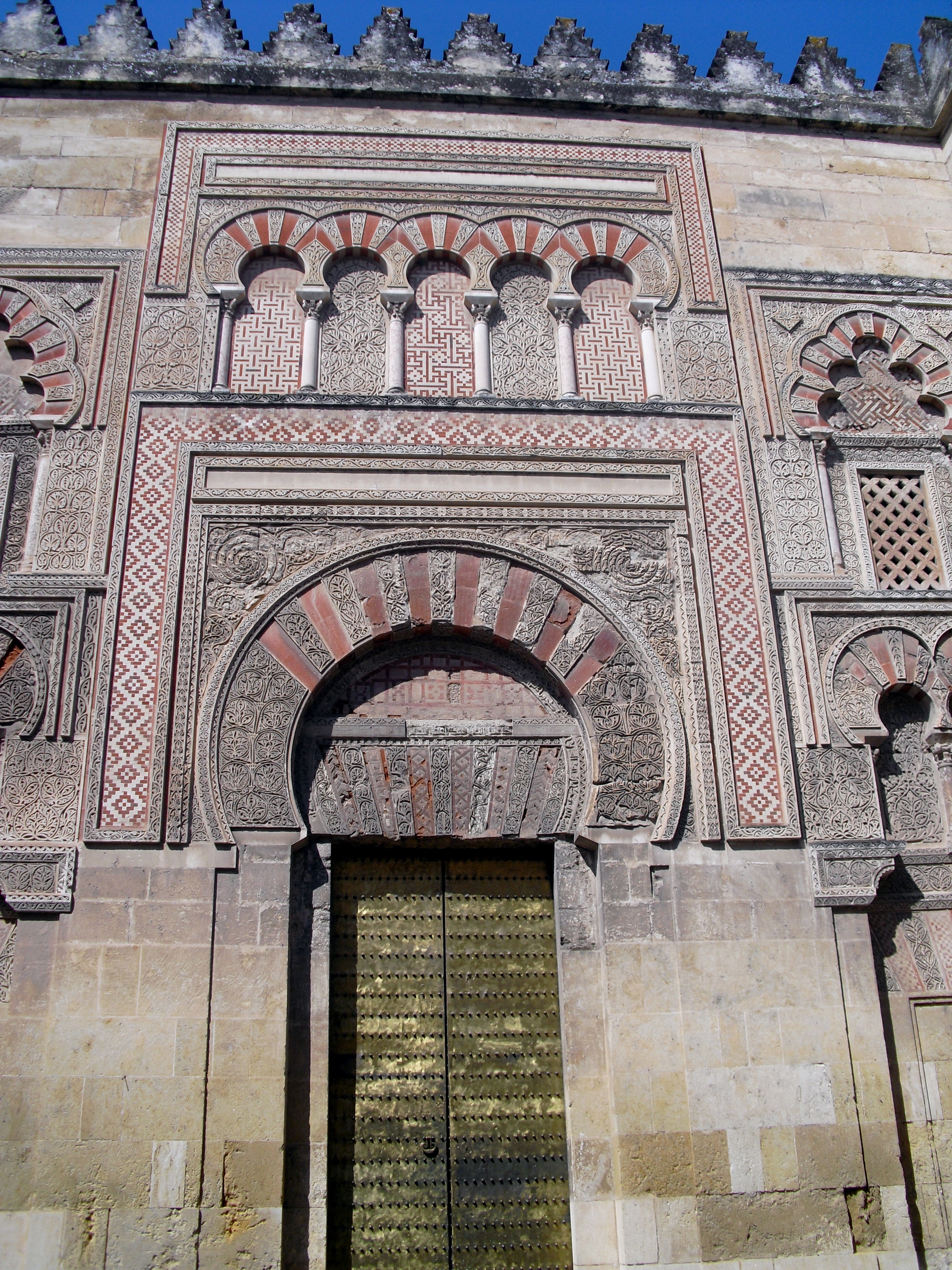
Puerta de San Juan

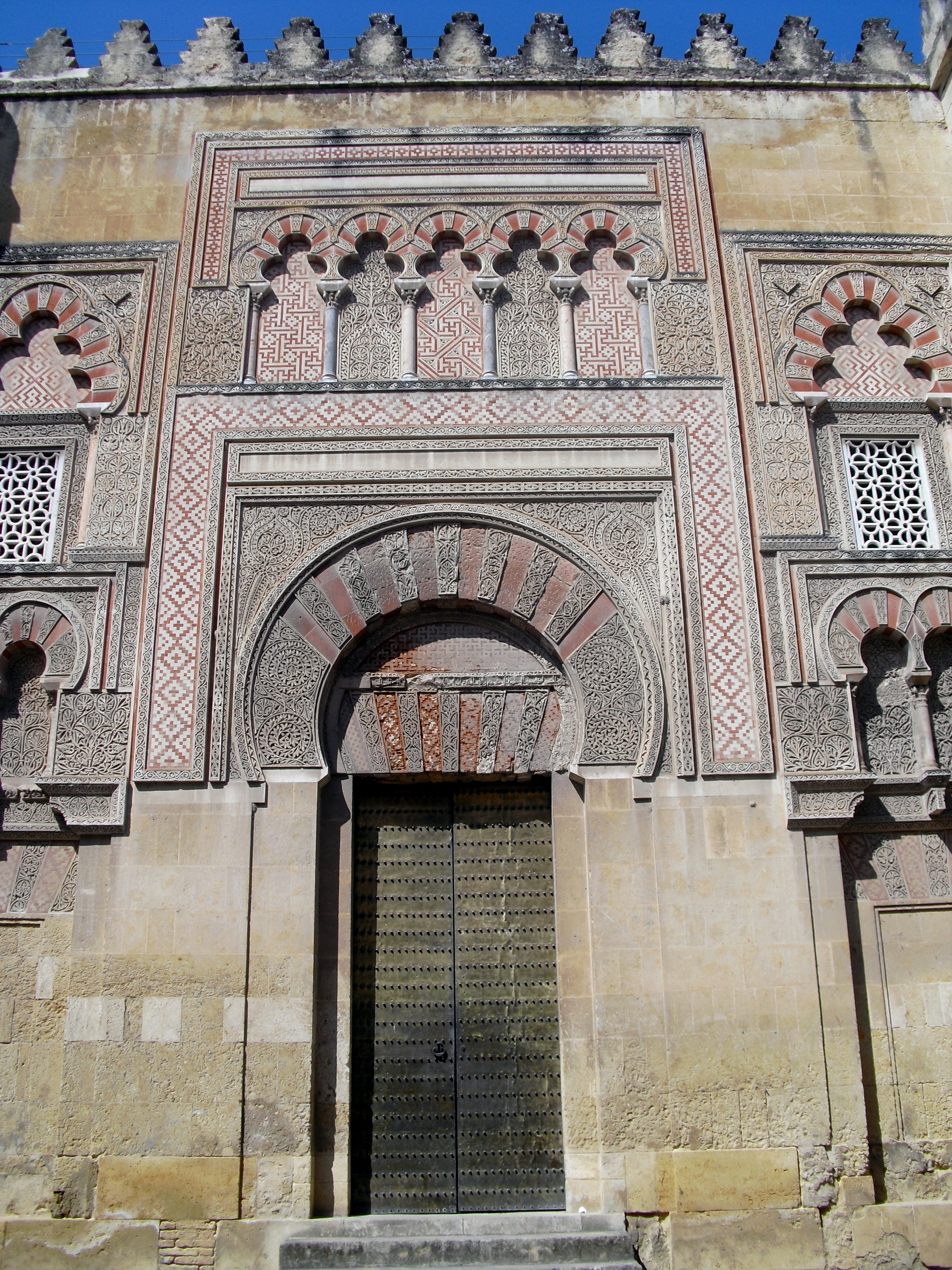
Puerta del Baptisterio

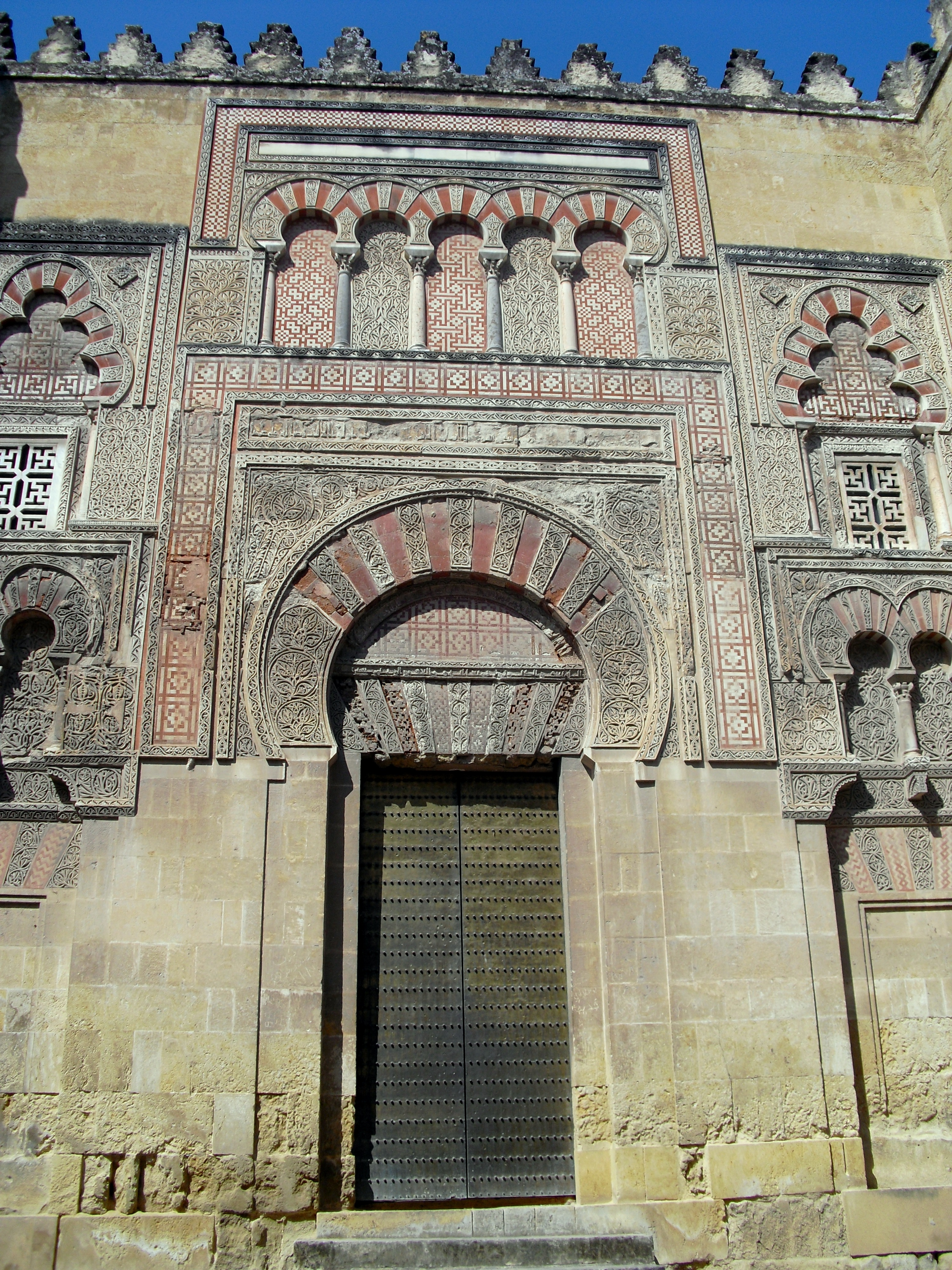
Puerta de San Nicolás

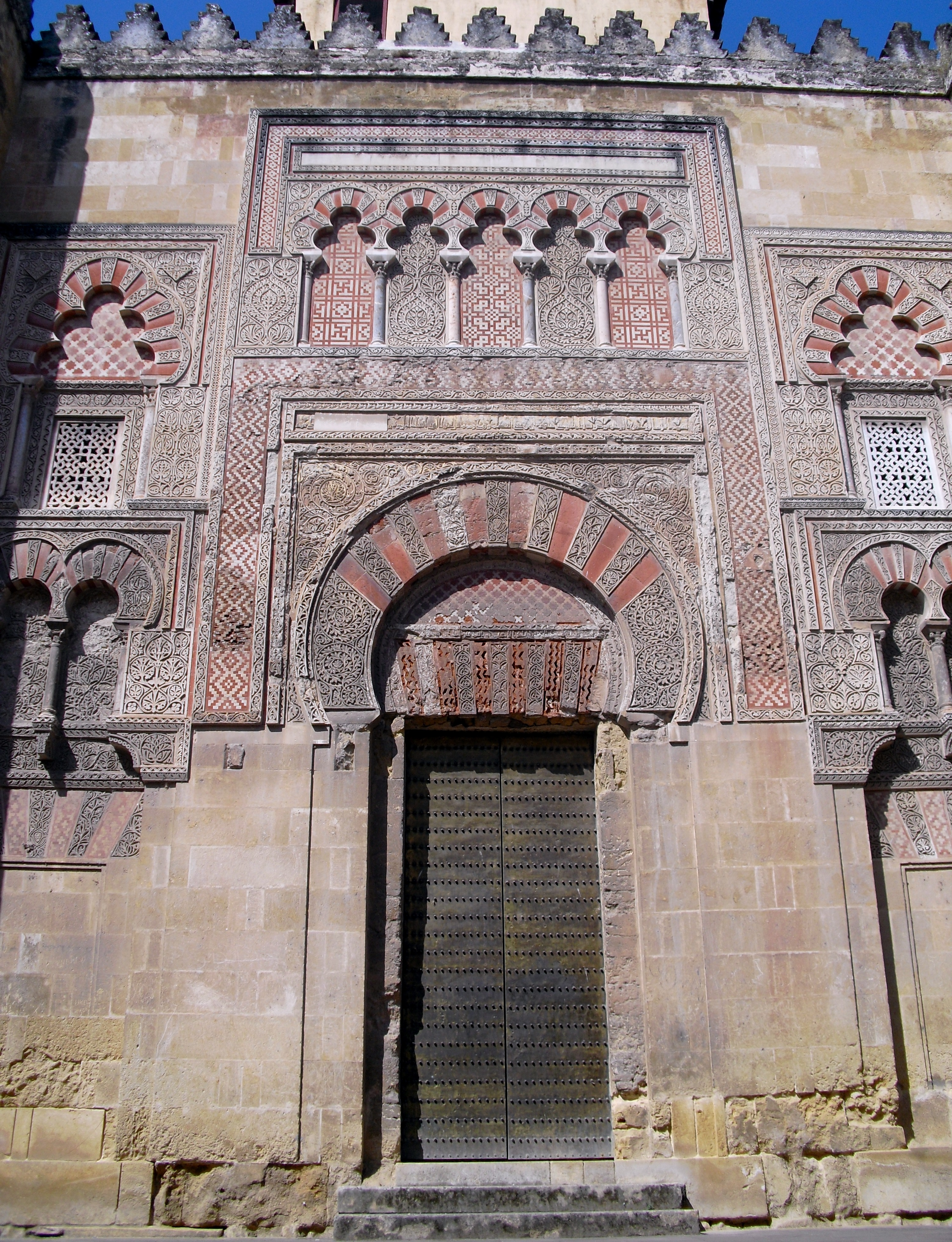
Puerta de la Concepción Antigua

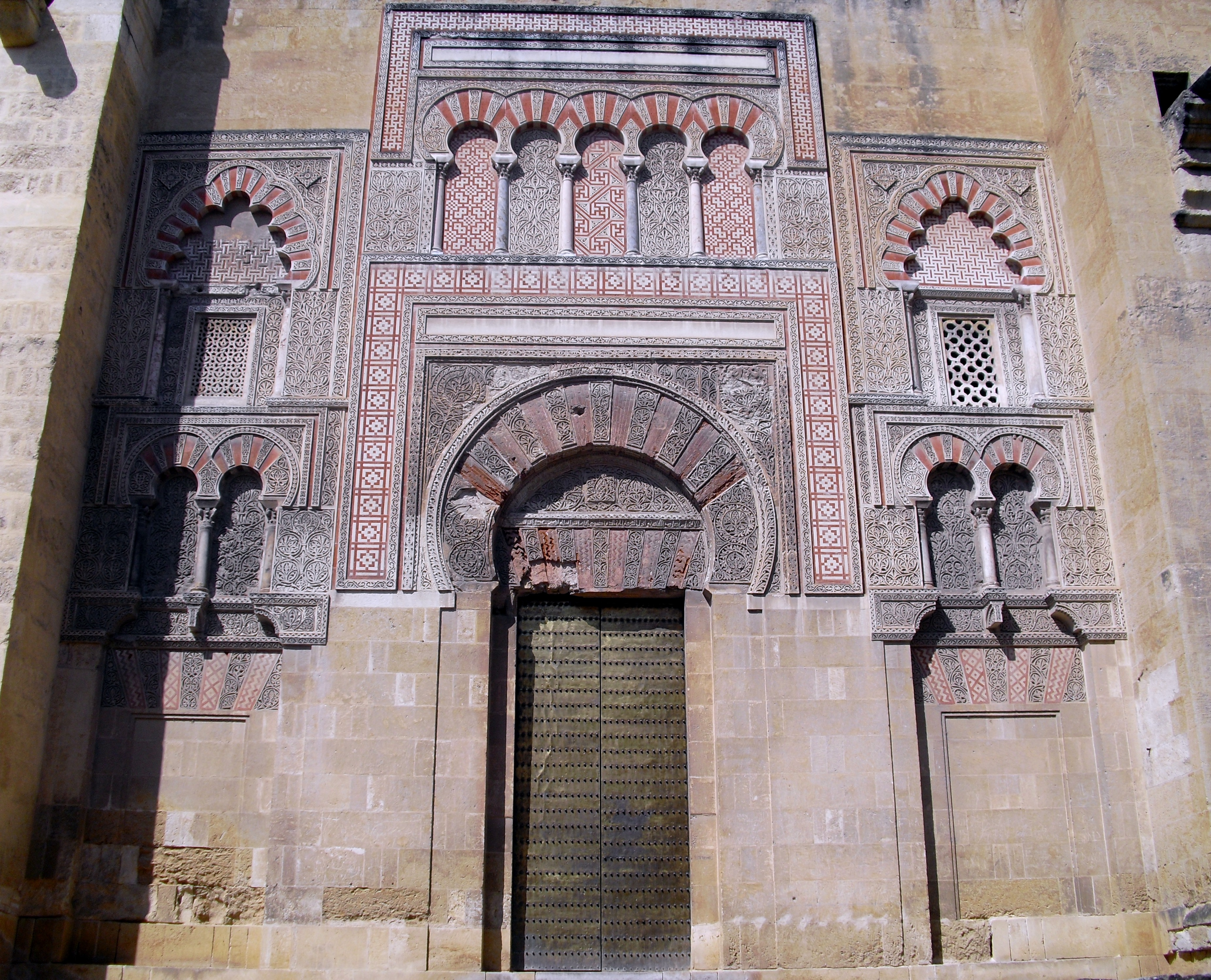
Puerta de San José

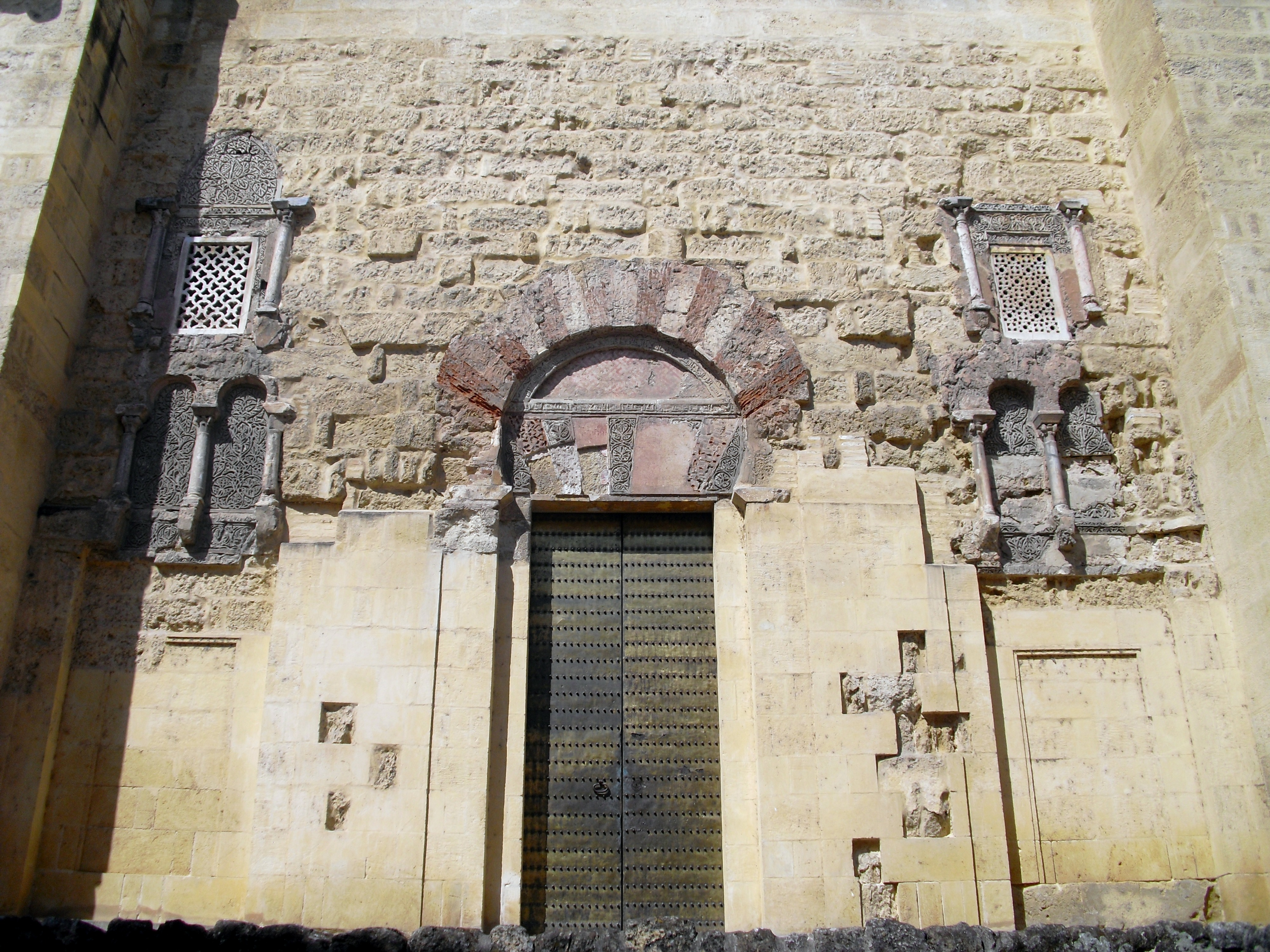
Puerta del Sagrario

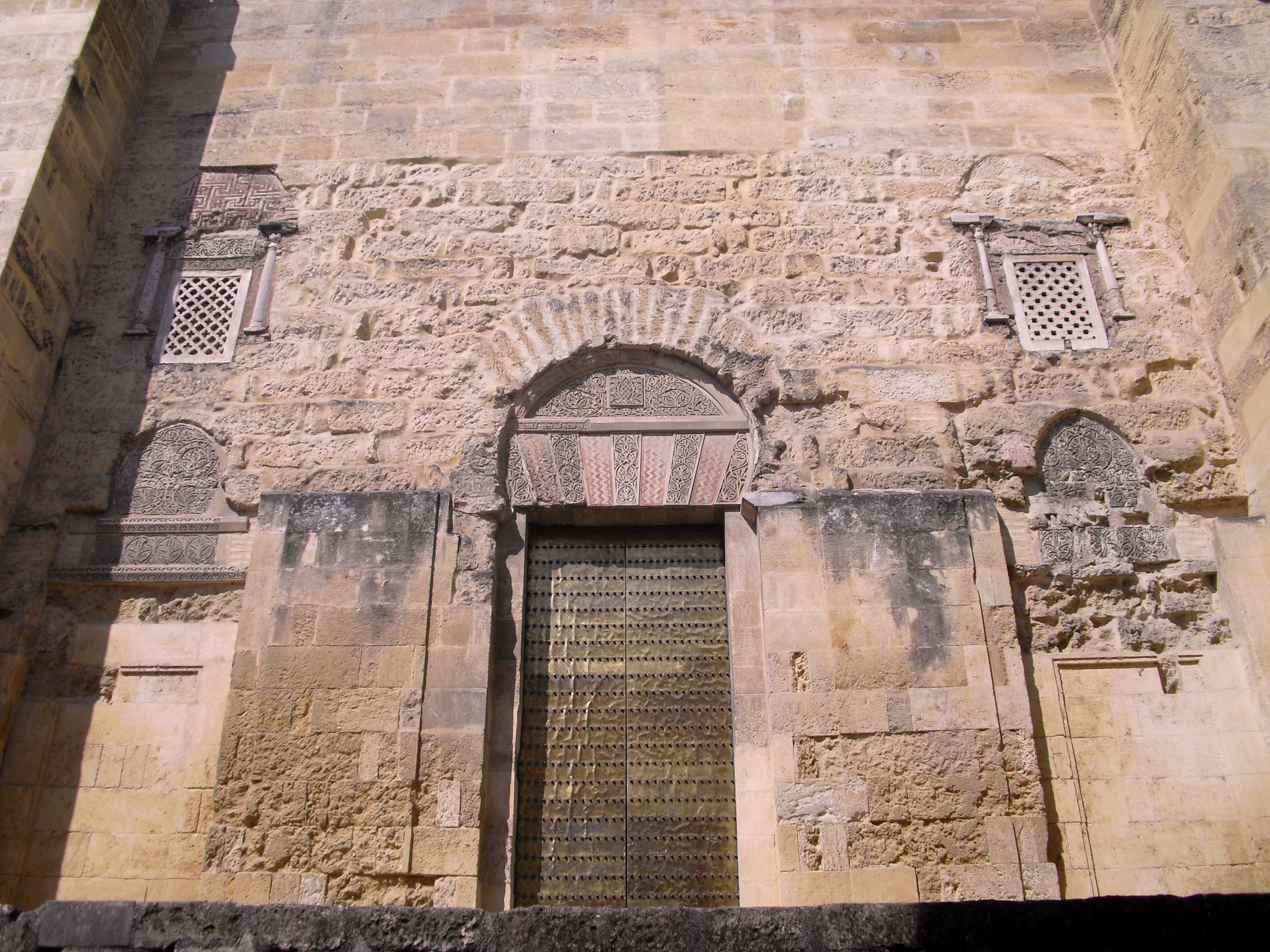
Puerta de Jerusalén

North façade, along calle Cardenal Herrero, west to east:

- Puerta del Perdón
- Puerta del Caño Gordo
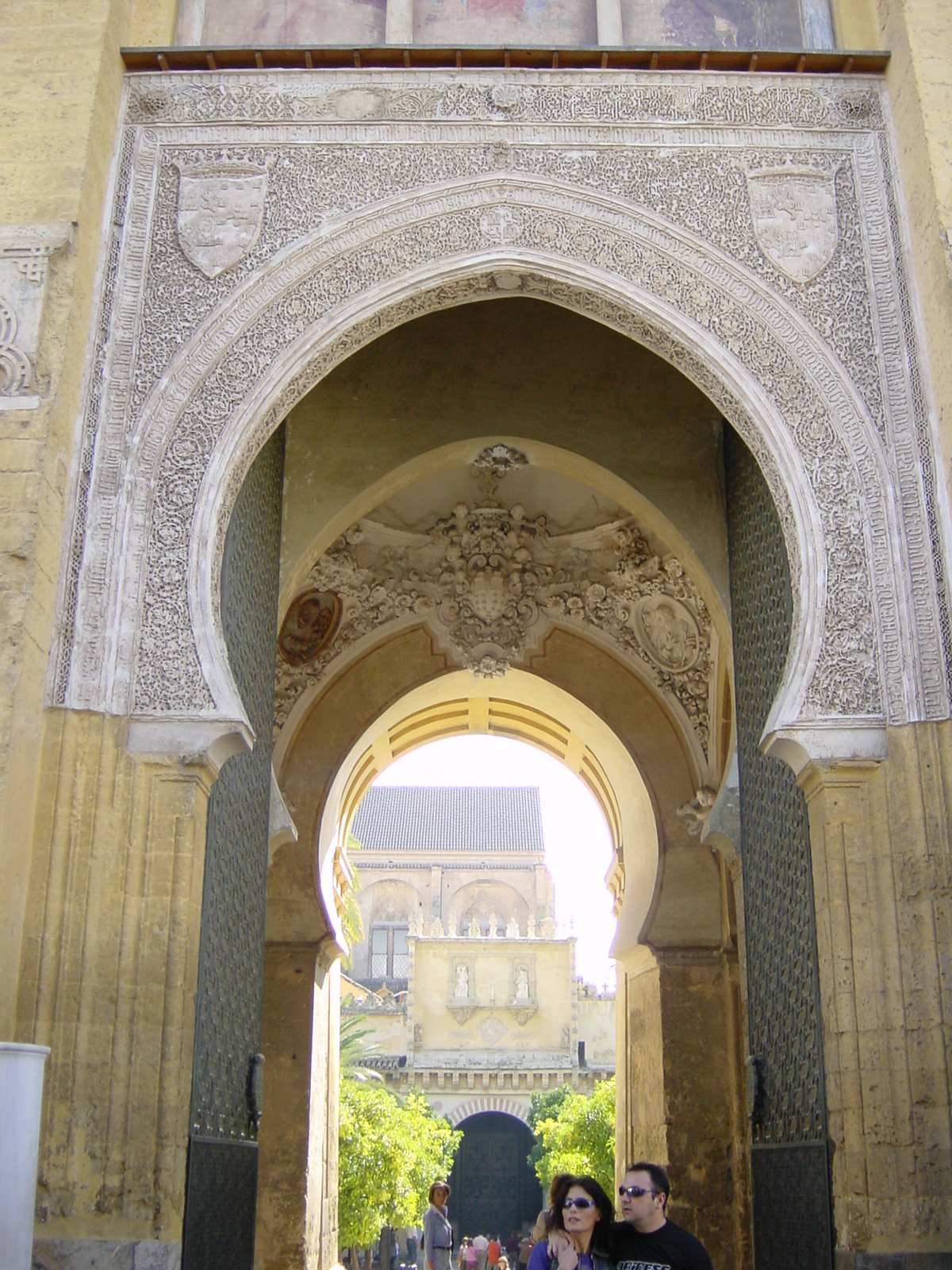
Puerta del Perdón

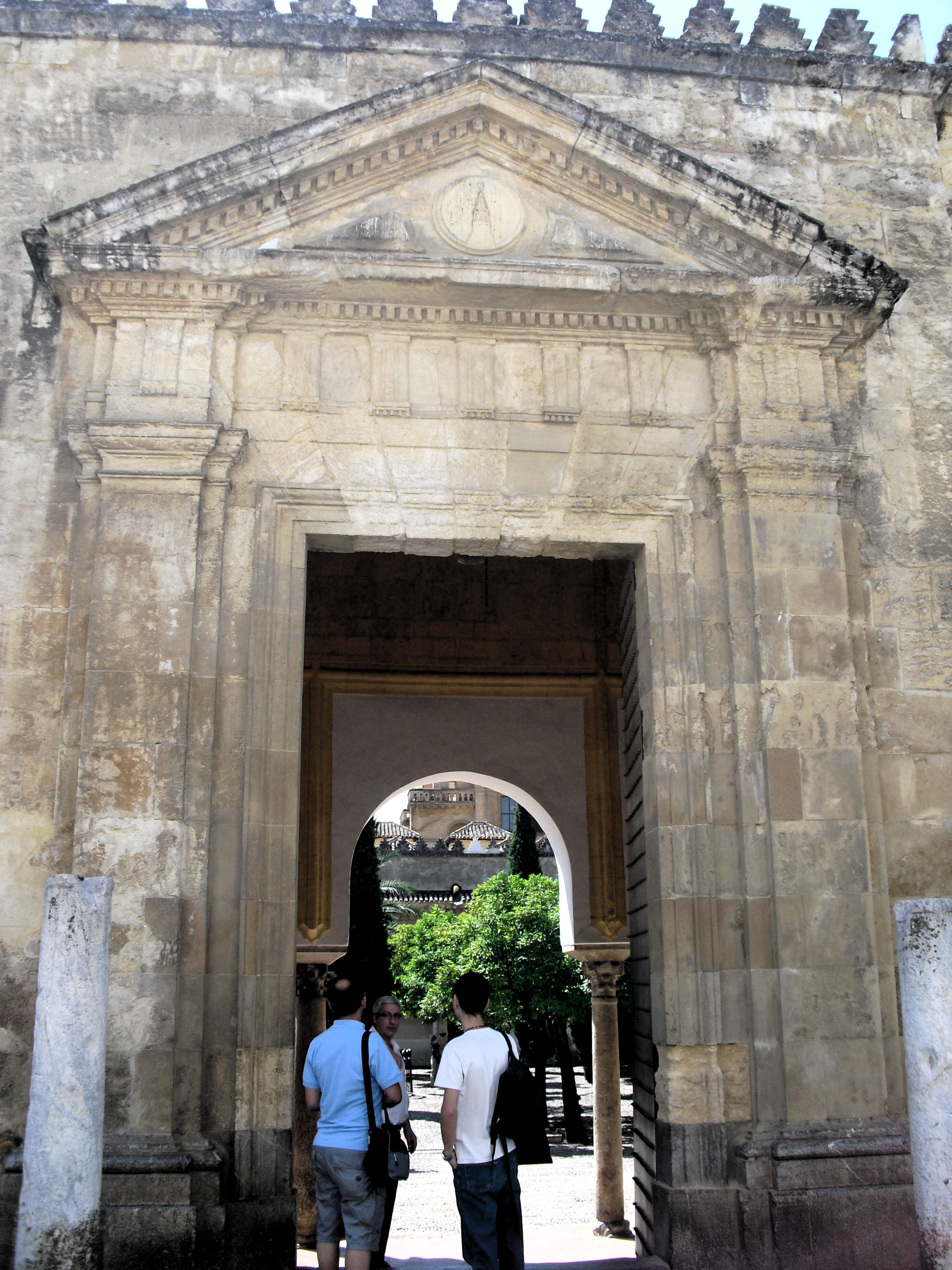
Puerta del Caño Gordo

== 2000s Muslim campaigns ==
Muslims across Spain have lobbied the Catholic Church to allow them to pray in the complex, with the Islamic Council of Spain lodging a formal request with the Vatican. However, Spanish church authorities and the Vatican have opposed this move. Muslim prayer has not been always banned outright and there are some cases of token concessions in the past, including Saddam Hussein's prayer at the Mihrab in December 1974.

== Ownership dispute ==
The building was formally registered for the first time by the Córdoba's Cathedral Cabildo in 2006 on the basis of the article 206 of the Ley Hipotecaria from 1946 (whose constitutionality has been questioned). The diocese never presented a formal title of ownership nor did provide a judicial sentence sanctioning the usurpation on the basis of a long-lasting occupation, with the sole legal argument being that of the building's "consecration" after 1236, as a cross-shaped symbol of ash was reportedly drawn on the floor at the time. Defenders of the ecclesial ownership argue on the basis of continuous and peaceful occupation of the building by the Church whereas defenders of the public ownership argue that the mosque-cathedral never ceased to be a State's property, initially belonging to the Crown of Castile (and henceforth the Spanish State). Advocates of ecclesiastical ownership reject the later argument, pointing to historical evidence that King Ferdinand III of Castile donated the cathedral to the Church in 1236.

PSOE's Isabel Ambrosio, Mayor of Córdoba from 2015 to 2019, defended a model of public and shared management. In July 2019, the subsequent mayor of Córdoba, José María Bellido, closed down a commission investigating ownership rights, saying it should be reserved for Catholic worship. He noted, "There are no administrative tasks arising from this commission and I've no intention of reactivating it."

== Legacy ==
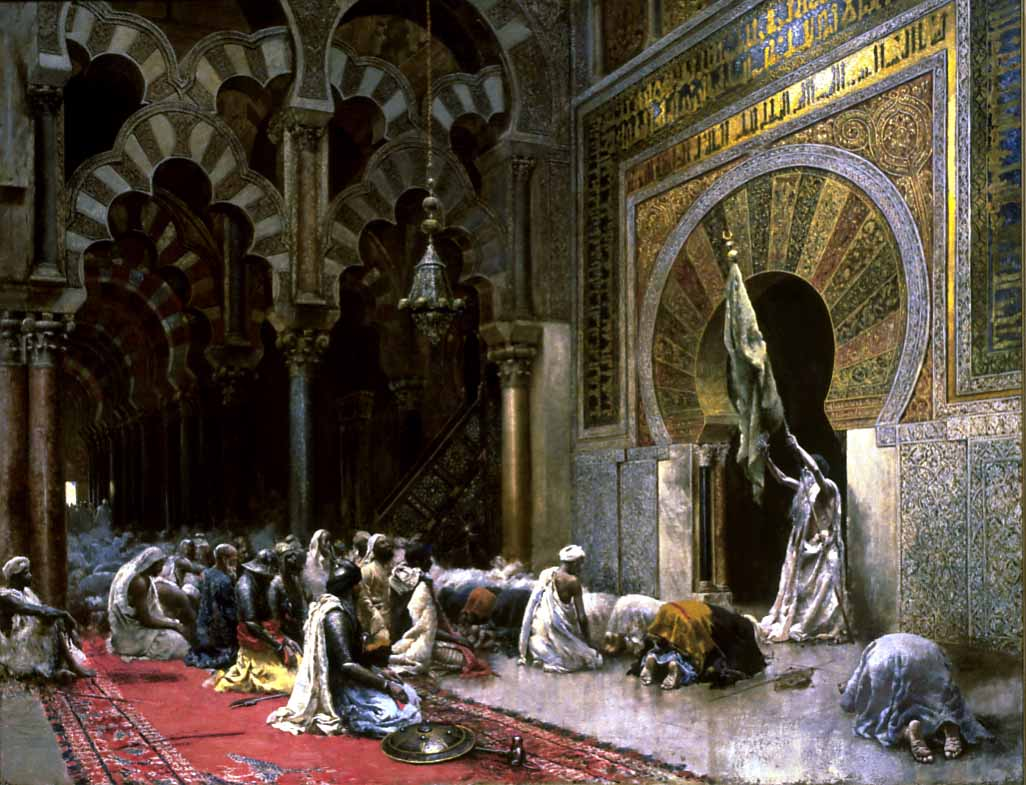
This painting by Edwin Lord Weeks (c. 1880) depicts an old Moor preaching holy war against Christians at the mosque's mihrab. "Despite the painting's illusion of reality, such a jihad, or holy war, would never have been called for in a mosque." Walters Art Museum

By leaving the mosque to coexist with the cathedral, the building is a physical repository of power struggles in Spain. Additionally, it is a showcase of architectural hybridity, representing ideological intersections between Christianity and Islam.

=== Architectural influence ===
The Great Mosque of Cordoba is a high point of the architecture of al-Andalus and one of the most important monuments of early Islamic architecture. It had a major influence on the subsequent architecture of Al-Andalus and of the Maghreb – what is known as "Moorish" architecture or western Islamic architecture – due to both its architectural innovations and its symbolic importance as the religious heart of the region's historic Cordoban Caliphate. Amira Bennison, for example, goes on to comment:

Despite the demise of the Umayyad caliphate and the concomitant decline of Córdoba's political status, its great mosque remained one of the most thoroughly described and lauded Islamic buildings for centuries to come. Al-Idrisi, writing in the Almohad era, devoted almost his entire entry on Córdoba, several pages in all, to describing the great mosque, giving almost forensic detail about its constituent parts. The key elements in this respect were its marble columns, its polygonal mihrab chamber, its Qur'an and its minbar, all of which went on to have long histories in the Maghrib, appropriated and adapted by the Almoravids and the Almohads in turn.

Jonathan Bloom also comments:

The prestige of the Córdoba mosque ensured that in subsequent centuries many of its features would be emulated in one way or another, becoming part of the emerging canon of architectural forms and decoration in the western lands of Islam.

Among other examples of important precedents, the overall form of the 8th or 9th-century Bab al-Wuzara gate (Puerta de San Esteban today), with its horseshoe arch, voussoirs of alternating colours, and rectangular alfiz frame, became one of the most recurring motifs of Islamic architecture in the region. The minaret commissioned by Abd ar-Rahman III in 951–952 was also highly influential and became the model for later minarets in the Maghreb and al-Andalus. Georges Marçais traces the possible origins of some later architectural motifs to the complex arches of Al-Hakam II's expansion, most notably the interlacing arches of the Aljafería in Zaragoza (11th century), the polylobed arches found throughout the region after the 10th century, and the sebka motif which became ubiquitous in Marinid, Zayyanid and Nasrid architecture after the Almohad period (12th-13th centuries). One exception to this legacy of influences was the mosaic decoration of the mosque's 10th-century mihrab, which, although admired, was not emulated by later architects.

The ribbed domes of al-Hakam II's expansion are also a curious innovation whose origins have been debated, but the appearance of similar (though simpler) domes in the small Bab al-Mardum Mosque in Toledo demonstrates that this feature spread into architectural designs beyond Cordoba. The domes also served as inspiration for the intricate ribbed dome made of plaster in the Great Mosque of Tlemcen (present-day Algeria), built by the Almoravids in the early 12th century, which in turn probably inspired similar domes built by the Marinids in the Great Mosque of Fes el-Jdid and the Great Mosque of Taza (present-day Morocco) in the late 13th century.

=== In popular culture ===
A posthumous poetical illustration by Letitia Elizabeth Landon to an engraving of a painting by David Roberts, was published in Fisher's Drawing Room Scrap Book, 1840. Entitled The Mosque at Cordova, this harks back to 'the Moslem rule in Spain'.

The South Asian Muslim philosopher and poet Muhammad Iqbal, who is widely regarded as having inspired the Pakistan Movement, visited the Great Cathedral of Córdoba in 1931–32. He asked the authorities to offer adhan at the cathedral and was even allowed to offer his prayers there. The deep emotional responses that the mosque evoked in him found expression in his poem called "The Mosque of Cordoba". Allama Iqbal saw it as a cultural landmark of Islam and described it as:

Sacred for lovers of art, you are the glory of faith,
You have made Andalusia pure as a holy land!

Louis L'Amour's The Walking Drum features a detailed description of the Court of Oranges in the 12th century.

== See also ==
- List of former mosques in Spain
- Early medieval domes
- Late medieval domes
- 16th-century Western domes
- Timeline of Muslim history
- 12 Treasures of Spain
- List of the oldest mosques
