= Aljafería =

Fortified palace in Zaragoza, Spain

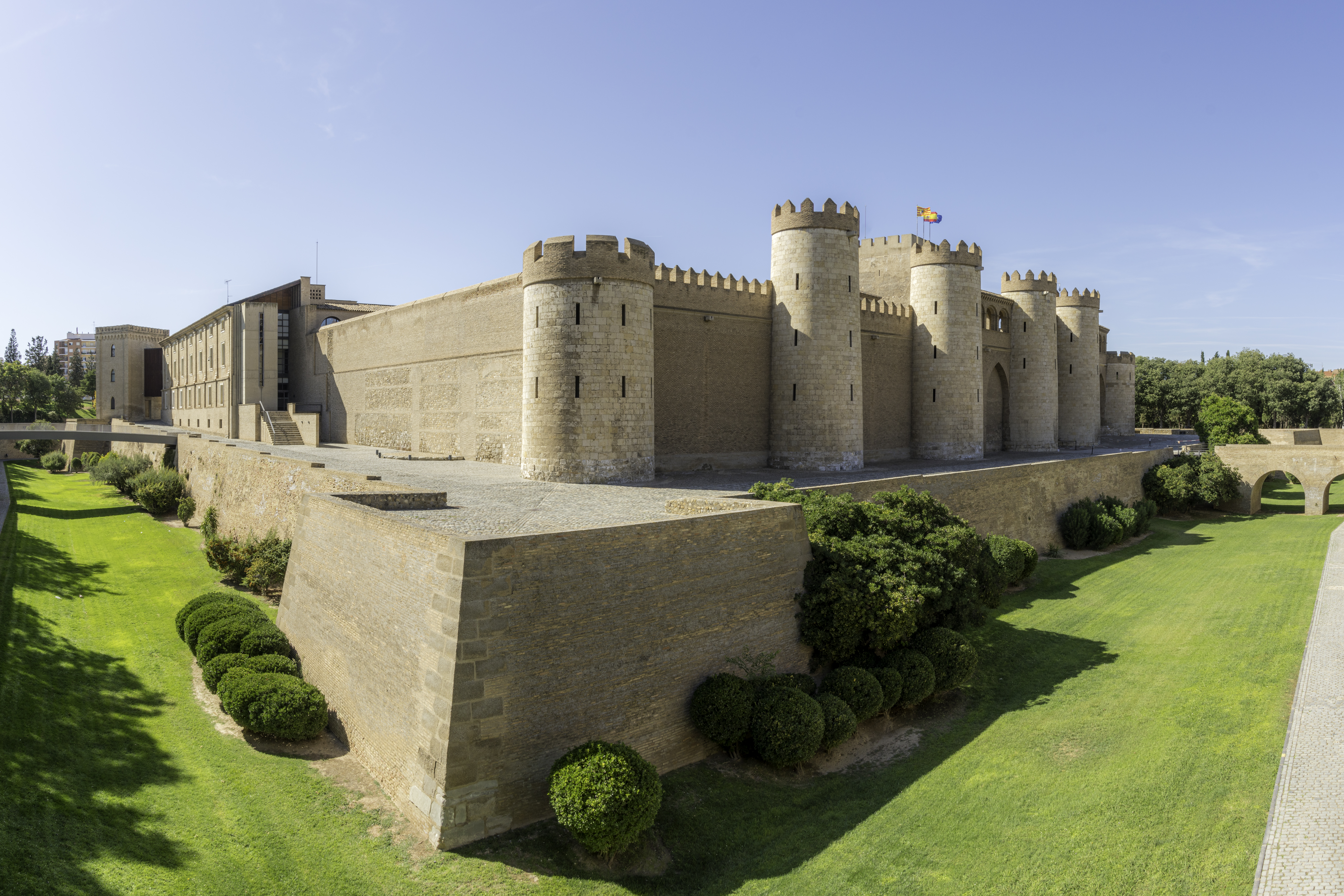
- South east corner

General information
- Location: Zaragoza, Spain
- Coordinates: 41°39′23″N 0°53′48″W
- Current tenants: Cortes of Aragon

UNESCO World Heritage Site
- Official name: Mudéjar remains of the Palace of Aljafería
- Type: Cultural
- Criteria: iv
- Designated: 2001 (25th session)
- Part of: Mudéjar Architecture of Aragon
- Reference no.: 378-008
- Region: Europe and North America

Spanish Cultural Heritage
- Official name: Palacio de la Aljafería
- Type: Non-movable
- Criteria: Monument
- Designated: 3 June 1931
- Reference no.: RI-51-0001033

The southern façade of the Aljafería Palace in Zaragoza, Spain. (2026)

Viewing the south east corner above the moat of the Aljafería Palace in Zaragoza, Spain. (2026)

The southern façade of the Aljafería Palace in Zaragoza, Spain. (2026) .02

The Aljafería Palace (Spanish: Palacio de la Aljafería; Arabic: قصر الجعفرية, tr. Qaṣr al-Jaʿfariyah) is a fortified medieval palace built during the second half of the 11th century in the Taifa of Zaragoza in Al-Andalus, present day Zaragoza, Aragon, Spain. It was the residence of the Arab Banu Hud dynasty during the era of Abu Jaffar Al-Muqtadir. The palace reflects the splendor attained by the Taifa of Zaragoza at its height. It currently houses the Cortes (regional parliament) of the autonomous community of Aragon.

The structure is the only conserved large example of Spanish Islamic architecture from the era of the taifas (independent kingdoms). The Aljafería, along with the Mosque–Cathedral of Córdoba and the Alhambra, are the three best examples of Hispano-Muslim architecture and have special legal protection. In 2001, the original restored structures of the Aljafería were included in the Mudéjar Architecture of Aragon, a World Heritage Site.

The style of ornamentation of the Aljafería, such as the use of mixtilinear arches and springers, the extension of arabesques over a large area, and the schematisation and progressive abstraction of the yeserias of a vegetal nature, strongly influenced Almoravid and Almohad art in the Iberian Peninsula. The shift in decoration towards more geometric motifs is at the basis of Nasrid art.

After the reconquest of Zaragoza in 1118 by Alfonso I of Aragón, it became the residence of the Christian kings of the Kingdom of Aragón. It was used as a royal residence by Peter IV of Aragón (1319–1387) and, in 1492, it was converted into the palace of the Catholic Monarchs. In 1593 it underwent another restructuring that would turn it into a military fortress, first according to Renaissance designs (which today can be seen in its surroundings, moat, and gardens) and later for quartering military regiments. It underwent further restructuring and damage, especially with the Sieges of Zaragoza of the Peninsular War, until it was finally restored in the 20th century.

The palace was built outside Zaragoza's Roman walls, in the plain of the saría. With urban expansion over the centuries, it is now inside the city.

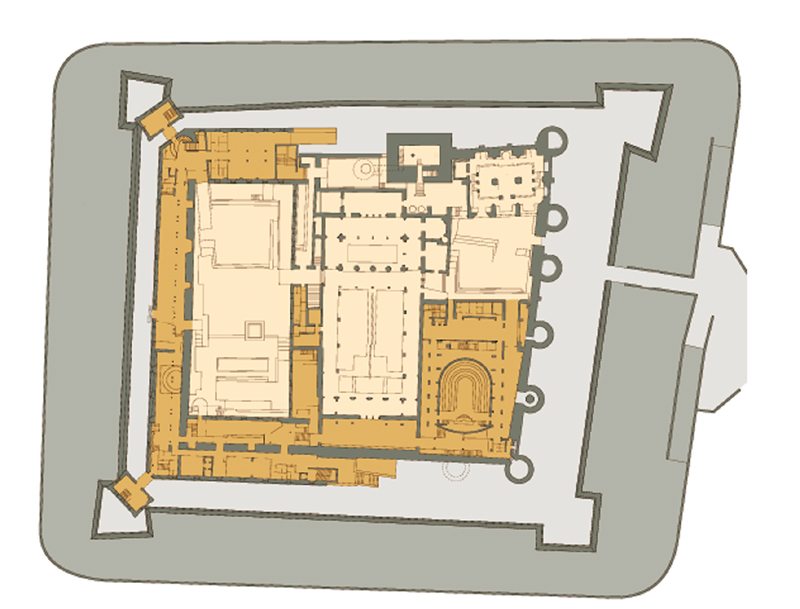
Floor plan

== Troubadour Tower ==
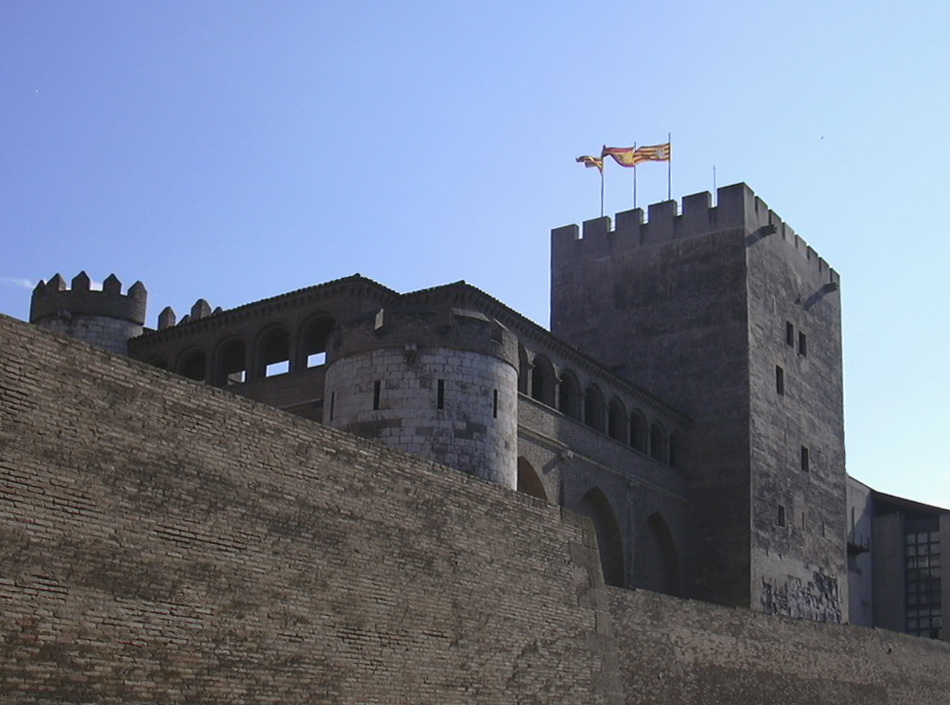
Troubadour Tower

The oldest component of the Aljafería is today known as the Troubadour Tower. The tower received this name from Antonio Garcia Gutierrez’s 1836 romantic drama The Troubadour, based largely at the palace. This drama became the libretto for Giuseppe Verdi’s opera Il trovatore.

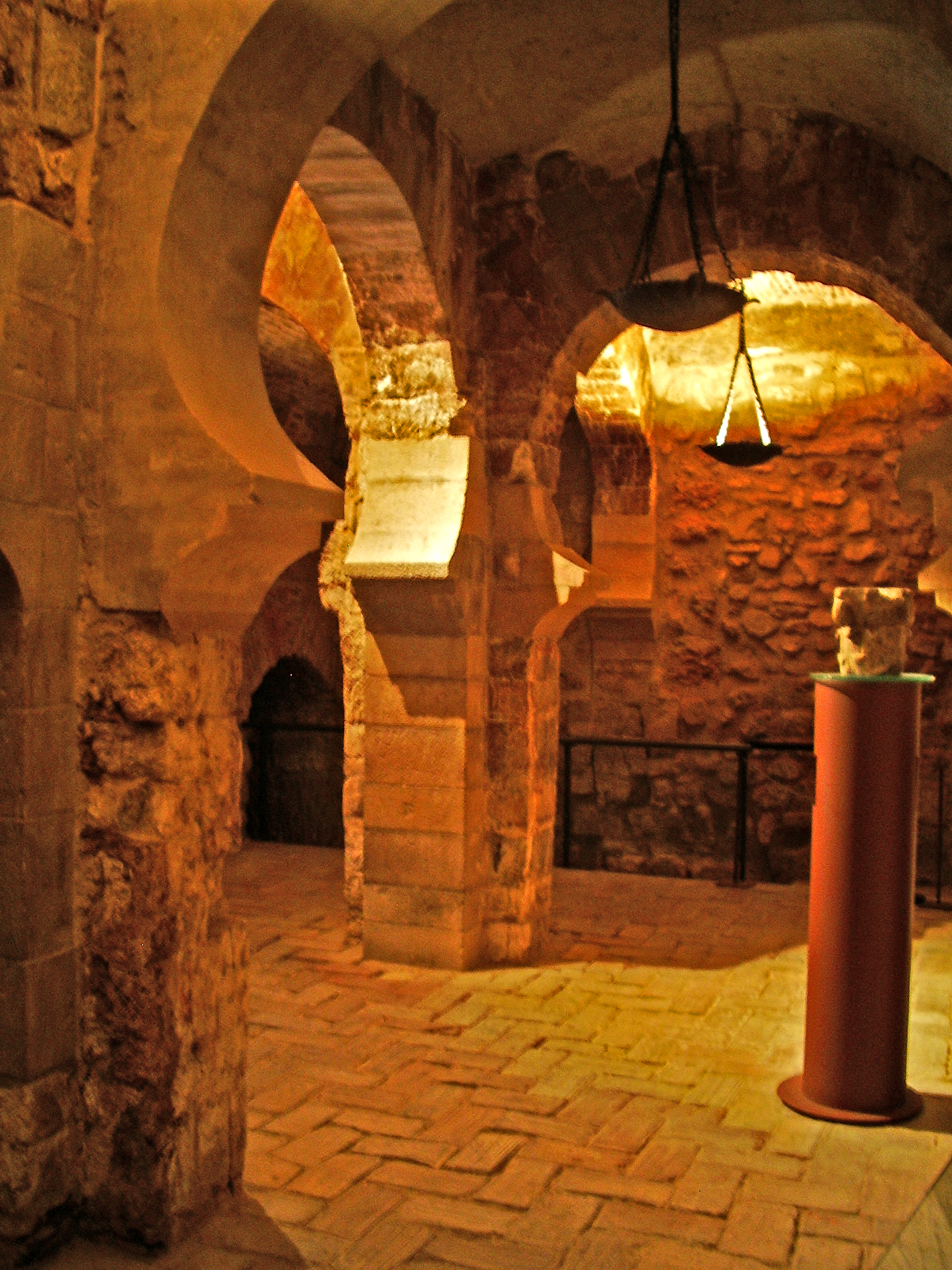
Horseshoe arches from the 9th or 10th century at the ground floor of the Troubadour Tower

The tower is a defensive structure, with a quadrangular base and five levels which date back to the end of the 9th century, in the reign of the first Banu Tujib, Muhammad Alanqur, who was appointed by Muhammad I of Córdoba, Emir of Córdoba. According to Cabañero Subiza, the tower was built in the second half of the 10th century. Its lower part has vestiges of the beginning of the heavy walls of alabaster ashlar bond masonry, and continues upwards with a plank lining of simple plaster and lime concrete, a lighter substance for reaching greater heights. The exterior does not reflect the division of the five internal floors and appears as an enormous prism, broken by narrow embrasures. Access to the interior was through a small, elevated door that was only reachable with a portable ladder. Its initial function was military.

The first level conserves the 9th-century building structure with two separate naves and six sections separated by two cruciform pillars and divided by lowered horseshoe arcs. In spite of their simplicity, they form a balanced space and could be used as baths.

The second floor repeats the same spatial scheme as the first and contains the remains of 11th century Muslim masonry. There is evidence that in the 14th century something similar happened to the appearance of the last two floors, of Mudéjar style, whose construction was due to the construction of the palace of Peter IV of Aragon, which is connected with the Tower of the Troubadour by a corridor, and would have been used as a keep. The arches of these structures already reflect its Christian structure, because they are slightly pointed and support flat wooden roofs.

Its function in the 9th and 10th centuries was as a watchtower and defensive bastion. It was surrounded by a moat. It was later integrated by the Banu Hud family in the construction of the castle-palace of the Aljafería, constituting one of the towers of the defensive framework of the outside north wall. During the Spanish Reconquista, it continued being used as a keep and in 1486 became a dungeon of the Inquisition. As a tower-prison it was also used in the 18th and 19th centuries, as demonstrated by the numerous graffiti inscribed there by the inmates.

== Moorish Taifal palace ==
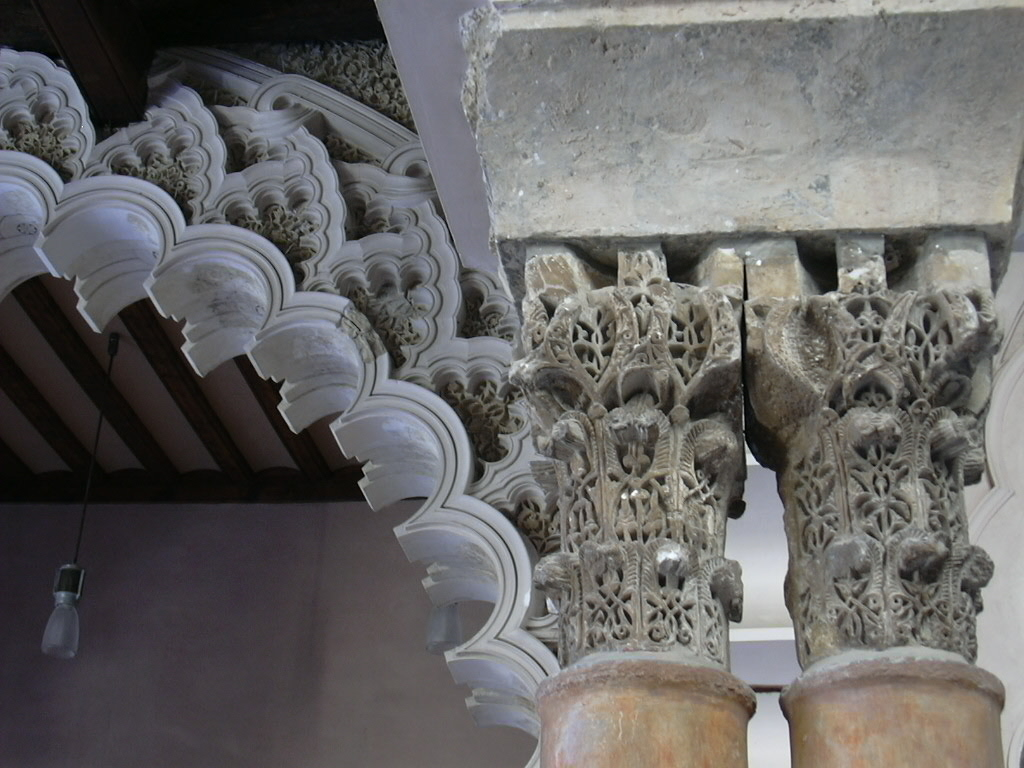
Capitals in the Taifal palace

The ornate stucco yesería decorative archways of the northern halls of the Aljafería Palace in Zaragoza, Spain. (2026)

The ornate stucco yesería decorative archways of the northern halls of the Aljafería Palace in Zaragoza, Spain. (2026) .02

The ornate stucco yesería decorative archways of the northern halls of the Aljafería Palace in Zaragoza, Spain. (2026) .03

The ornate stucco yesería decorative archways of the northern halls of the Aljafería Palace in Zaragoza, Spain. (2026) .05

The construction of the palace, mostly completed between 1065 and 1081, was ordered by Abú Ja'far Ahmad ibn Sulaymán al-Muqtadir Billah, known by his honorary title of al-Muqtadir (the powerful), the second monarch of the Banu Hud dynasty, as a symbol of the power achieved by the Taifa of Zaragoza in the second half of the 11th century. The Emir himself called his palace "Qasr al-Surur" (Palace of Joy) and the throne room in which he presided over receptions and embassies "Maylis al-Dahab" (Golden Hall) as is testified in the following verses written by the Emir:

Oh Palace of Joy!, Oh Golden Hall!

Because of you, I reached the maximum of my wishes.
And even though in my kingdom I had nothing else,

for me you are everything I could wish for.

The name Aljafería is first documented in a text by Al-Yazzar as-Saraqusti (active between 1085 and 1100) – which also gives the name of the architect of the Taifal palace, the Slav Al-Halifa Zuhayr – and another from Ibn 'Idhari of 1109, as a derivation from the pre-name of Al-Muqtadir, Abu Ya'far, and "Ya'far", "Al-Yafariyya", which evolved to "Aliafaria" and from there to "Aljafería".

The general layout of the palace follows the archetype of desert castles in Syria and Jordan from the first half of the 8th century (such as Qasr al-Hayr al-Sharqi, Msatta, Khirbat al-Mafjar, and, from the early Abbasid era, the al-Ukhaidir Fortress). These castles were square with ultrasemicircular towers and a central tripartite space, creating three rectangular spaces, with the central one having a courtyard with pools and, at the northern and southern ends, the palace living quarters.

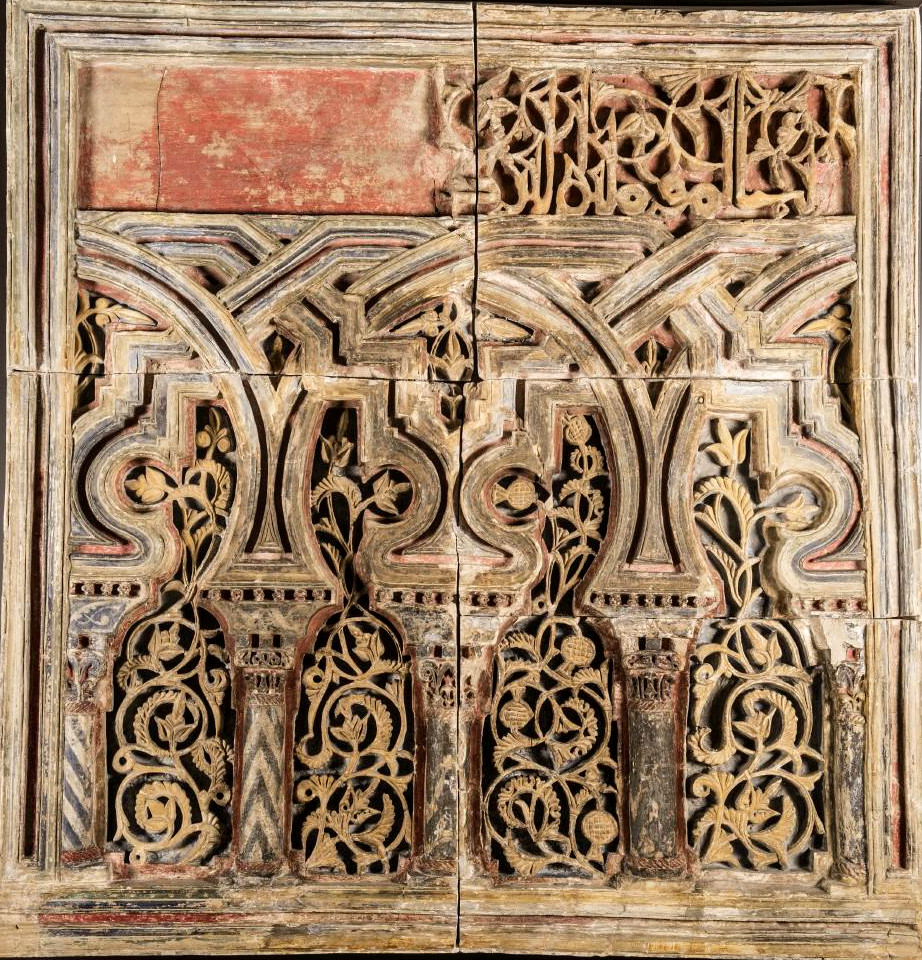
Detail of the frieze of the Golden Hall of the Aljafería, that conserves remains of polychrome. 11th century.

The Aljafería follows this model, with the section for the nobility in the central segment of the square, although the alignment of the sides of this plan is irregular. It is the central rectangle that houses the palatial buildings, organized around a courtyard with cisterns in front of the north and south porticos containing the royal rooms and saloons.

At the north and south ends are the porticos and living quarters. The north end was more important, as it was endowed with a second floor and greater depth, and was preceded by an open and profusely decorated column wall that stretched across two pavilions on its flanks and served as a theatrical porch to the throne room (the "golden hall" of the verses of Al-Muqtadir). It produced a set of architectural spaces, beginning with the perpendicular corridors of the ends emphasized by the height of the second floor, and ended with the Troubadour Tower looming in the background from the perspective of a spectator in the courtyard. All this, reflected also in the cistern, enhanced the royal area, which is corroborated by the presence at the eastern end of the northern border of a small private mosque with a mihrab.

In the center of the northern wall of the interior of the Golden Hall was a blind arch – where the king stood – with a traditional geometric pattern imitating the latticework of the mihrab façade of the Mosque of Córdoba, the building which it sought to emulate. In this way, from the courtyard, it appeared half-hidden by the columns of both the archway leading to the Golden Hall and those of the immediate portico, which gave an appearance of latticework and an illusion of depth, lending splendor to the figure of the monarch.

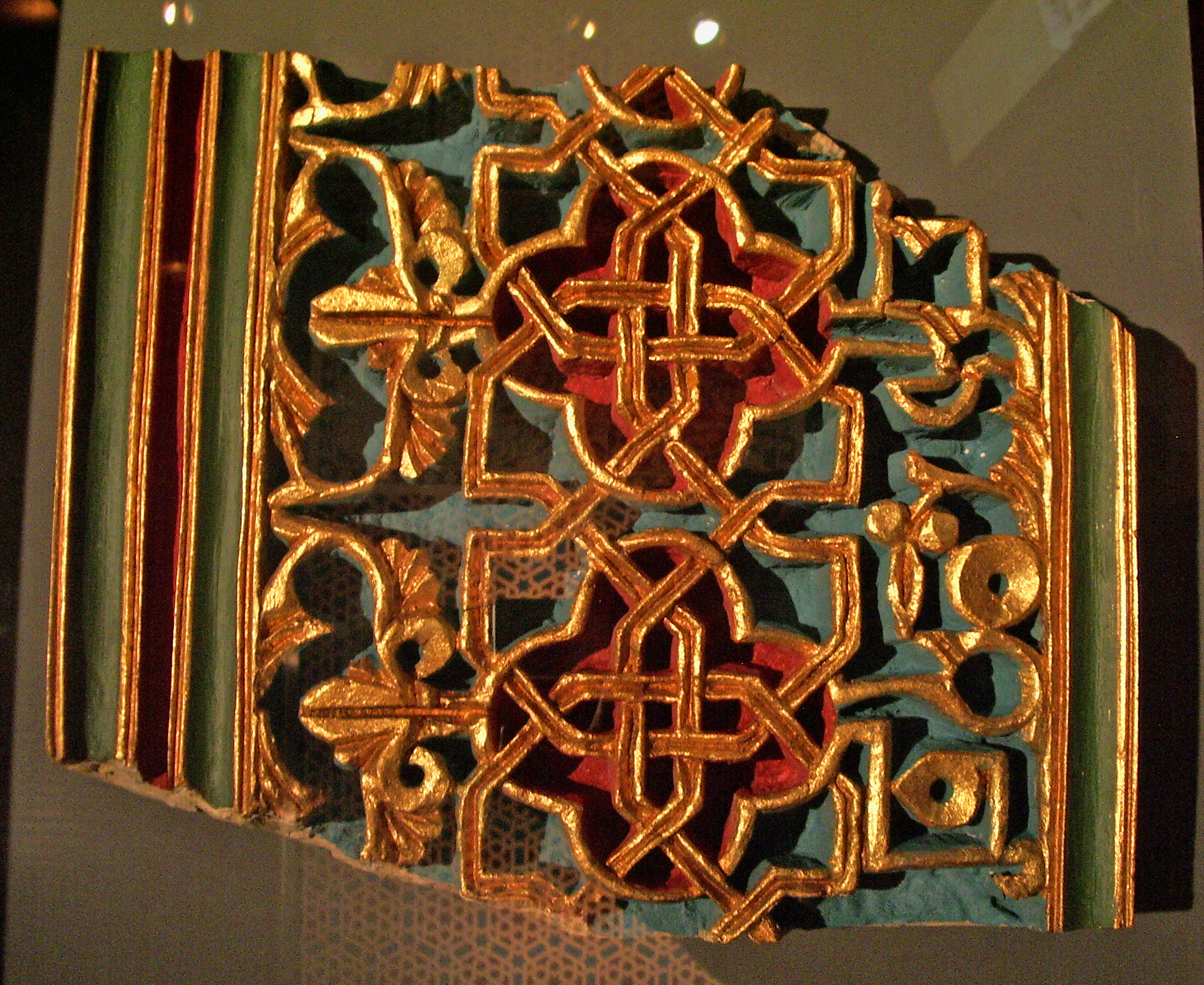
Remains of polychrome on a yeseria panel with geometric decoration

At the end of the 11th century, all the vegetal, geometric, and epigraphic reliefs were given polychrome decorations with predominately red and blue backgrounds and gold reliefs. Together with the soffits in alabaster with epigraphic decoration and the floors of white marble, it gave the whole a magnificent aspect.

The various changes to the Aljafería have removed many of the 11th century stuccos and, with the construction of the palace of the Catholic Monarchs in 1492, the entire second floor, which broke the ends of the Taifal arches. In the current restoration, the original arabesques are darker than the reconstructed decorations in white, smooth plaster. The structure of the arches, however, remains undamaged.

The decoration of the walls of the Golden Hall has disappeared for the most part, although remains are preserved in the Zaragoza Museum and in the National Archaeological Museum of Madrid. Francisco Íñiguez began its restoration, restoring the decorations that existed in its places of origin and extracting complete casts of the arcades of the south portico.

=== North side halls ===
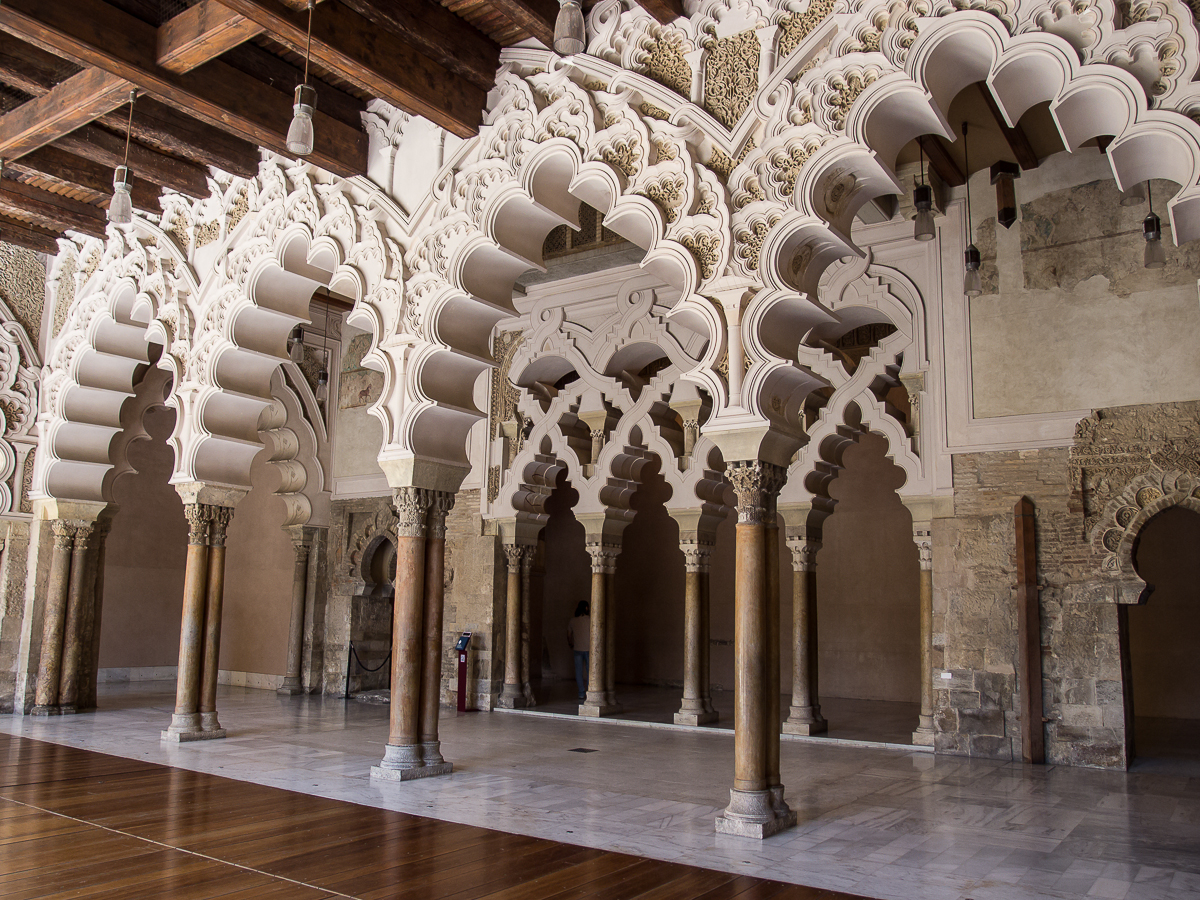
The Moorish taifa north side halls

Along the north wall is the most important complex of buildings built in the Banu Hud period, including the Throne Room or Golden Hall and the small private mosque, located on the eastern side of the access portico that serves as an antechamber to the oratory. In its interior, it houses a mihrab in the southeast corner oriented in the direction of Mecca, as in all mosques except the Mosque–Cathedral of Córdoba.

The floors of the royal rooms were marble with an alabaster plinth. The capitals were alabaster, except some that reused marble of the Caliphate period. These rooms were surrounded by a band of epigraphic decoration with Kufic characters reproducing Quran surahs that alluded to the symbolic meaning of the ornamentation. The surahs corresponding to these inscriptions have been deduced from the surviving fragments.

In two of these calligraphic reliefs can be found the name of al-Muqtadir, which date the first phase of construction of the palace to between 1065 and 1080. They say "This [the Aljafería] was ordered by Ahmad al-Muqtadir bi-Llāh".

=== Golden Hall ===
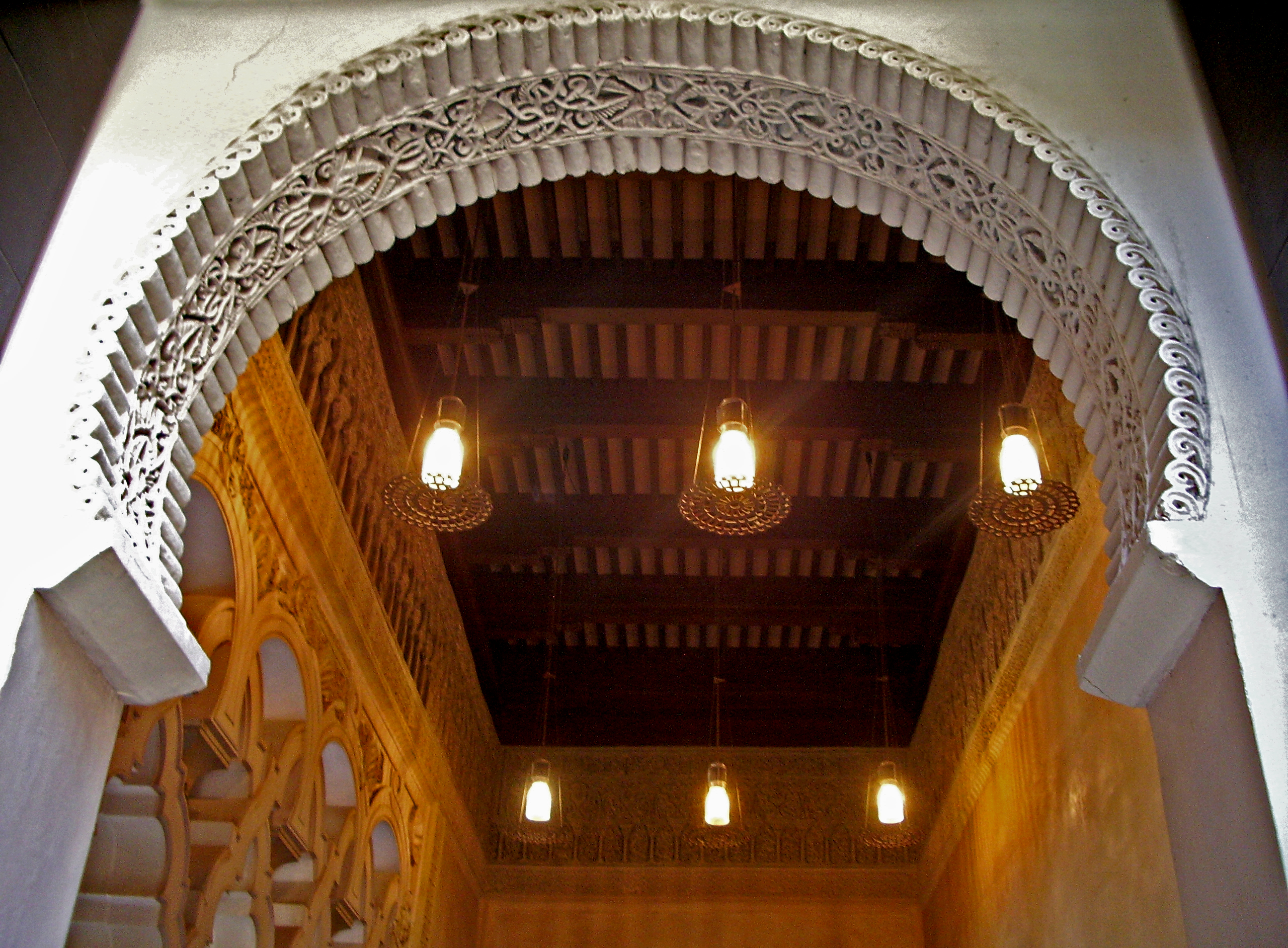
The roof of the Golden Hall from the door of the eastern bedroom, showing the intrados of the bow decorated with yeserias

The Golden Hall had at its east and west ends two private bedrooms, possibly for royal use. Today the bedroom on the western flank has been lost, but it was used as a royal bedroom and also used by the Aragonese kings until the 14th century.

Most of the arabesque yeserias that covered the walls, as well as an alabaster base two and a half metres high and the white marble floors of the original palace, have been lost. The remains that have been preserved, both in museums and the few that are in the royal hall, nevertheless allow a reconstruction of the ornate, polychrome decoration.

Ceilings and wood carvings reproduced the sky, and the whole room was an image of the cosmos, clothed with symbols of the power exercised over the celestial universe by the monarch of Saragossa, who thus appeared as heir to the caliphs.

Access to the Golden Hall is through a wall with three openings. The very large central opening consists of five double marble columns with stylized Islamic alabaster capitals that support four mixtilinear arches, between which are other simpler horseshoe shapes.

=== Entrance portico to the Golden Hall ===
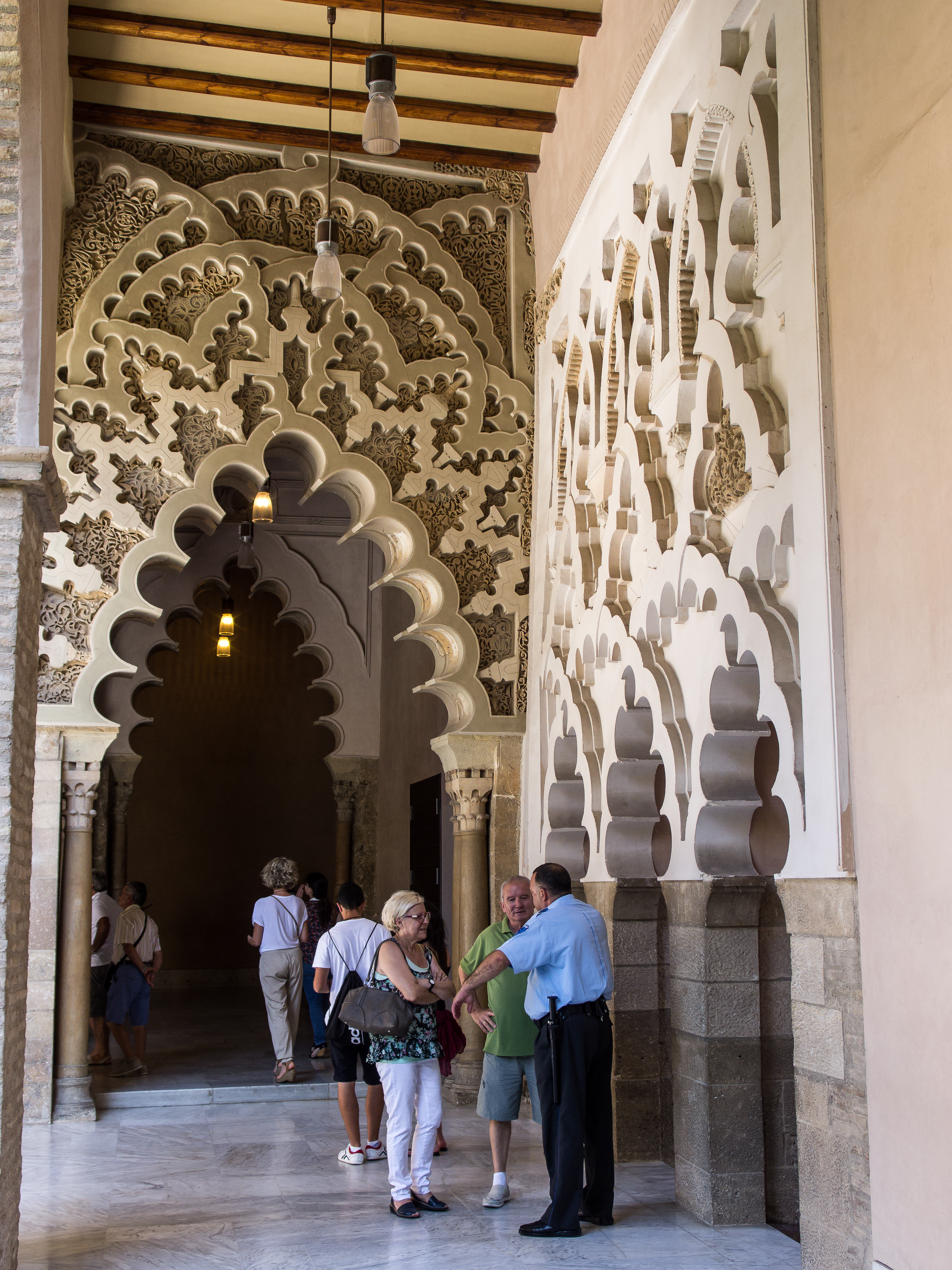
Arch of the entrance portico

Towards the south, another structure of similar size, but shallower, is connected to the courtyard by a portico of great multilobed arches. Again there is a tripartite space; the east and west ends extend perpendicularly with two lateral galleries that are accessed by wide polyhedral lobes and end in separate pointed, multilobed arches whose alfiz is decorated by complex lacing and arabesque reliefs.

In addition, all the ornamentation of yeserias of the palace was polychrome in shades of blue and red in the back and gold in the arabesques. Among the filigrees is the representation of a bird, an unusual zoomorphic figure in Islamic art that could represent a pigeon, a pheasant, or a symbol of the king as winged being.

The characteristic interlocking mixtilinear arches are found for the first time in the Aljafería, from where they spread to other Islamic structures.

=== Mosque and oratory ===
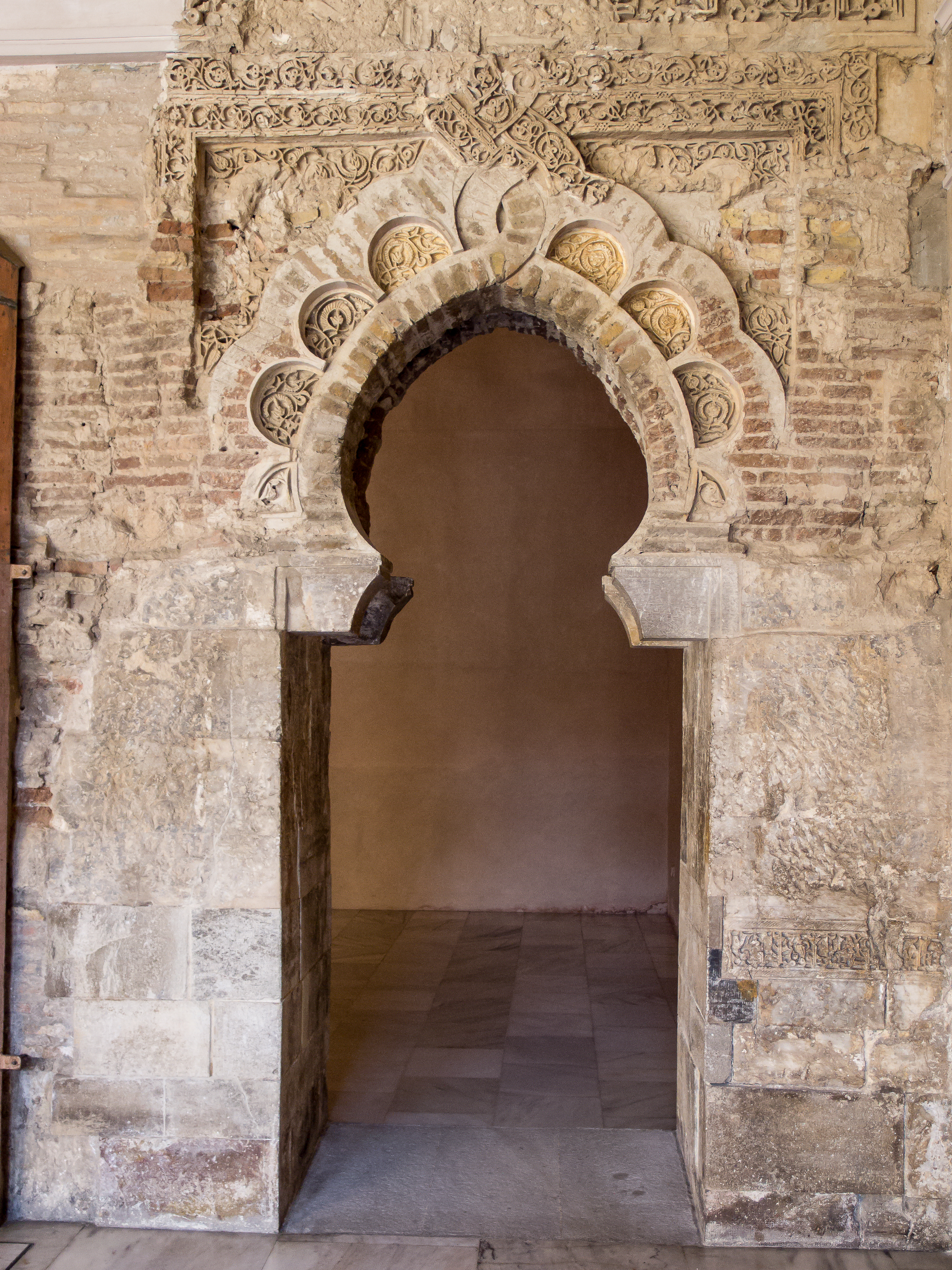
Door to the mosque

The historic portal to the mosque within the northern hall of the Aljafería Palace in Zaragoza, Spain. (2026)

At the eastern end of the entrance portico to the Golden Hall is a small mosque or private oratory that would have been used by the monarch and his courtiers. It is accessed through a portal that ends in a horseshoe arch inspired by the Mosque of Córdoba but with S-shaped springers, a novelty that imitated Almoravid and Nasrid art. This arch rests on two columns with capitals of very geometrical leaves, in the style of Granadan art using mocárabe. Its alfiz is profusely ornamented with vegetal decoration and on it is arranged a frieze of crossing half-point arcs.

The interior of the oratory is a smaller square space with chamfered corners that turn it into a false octagonal plan. In the southeast sector, oriented towards Mecca, is the niche of the mihrab. The front of the mihrab is shaped by a traditional horseshoe arch, with Cordoban shapes and alternating voussoir blocks, some of which are decorated with vegetal reliefs and others are smooth (although originally they were painted). The arch is reminiscent of the mihrab of the Mosque of Córdoba, only what were rich materials (mosaics and Byzantine bricklayers) in Zaragoza, with greater material poverty than the Caliphian Córdoba, are plaster stucco and polychrome, the latter having been mostly lost in the palace. An alfiz framed the back of the arch, with two mirrored rosettes recessed in curved triangles, like in the dome of the interior of the mihrab.

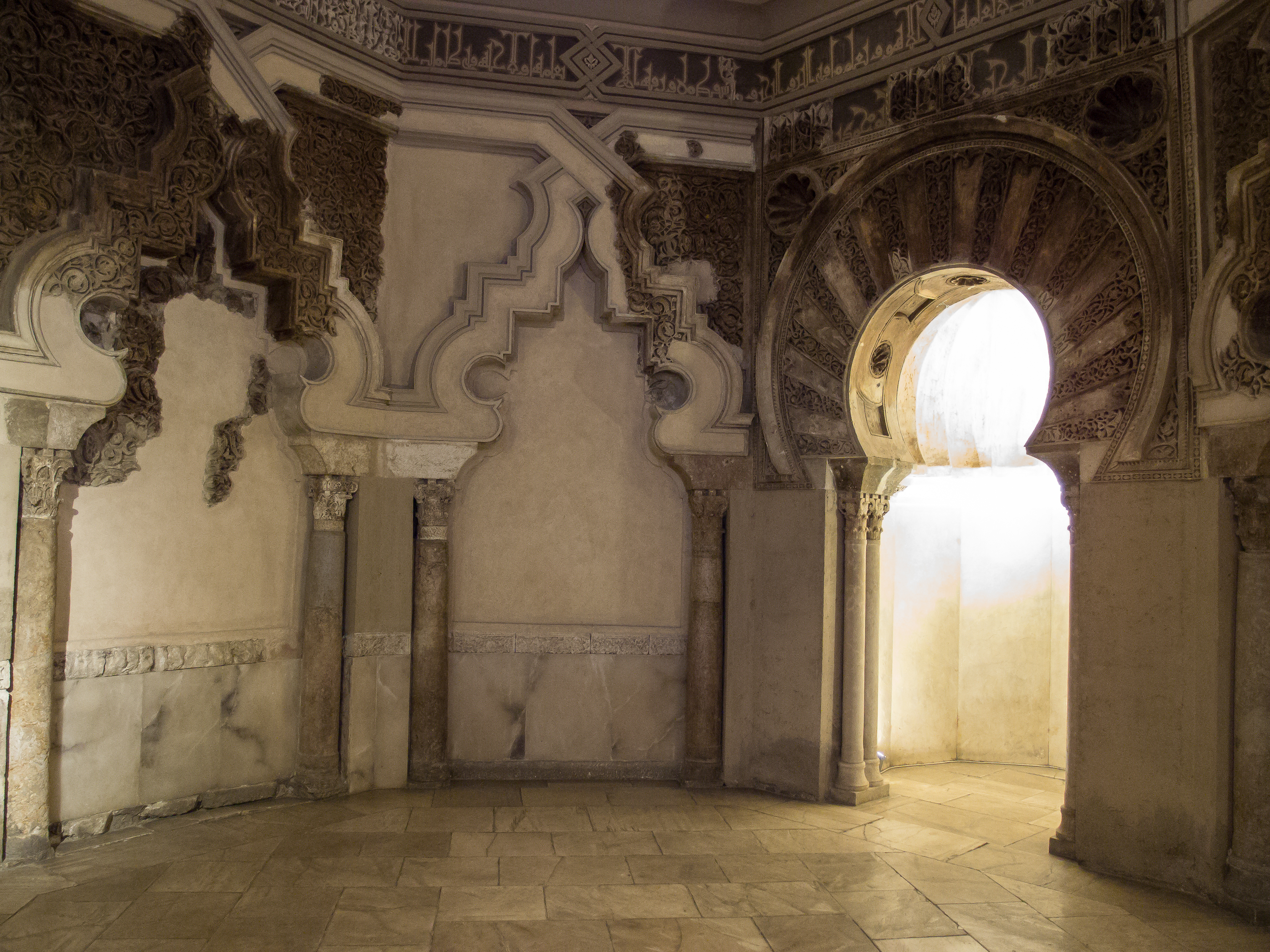
Interior of the Oratory. Front of mihrab

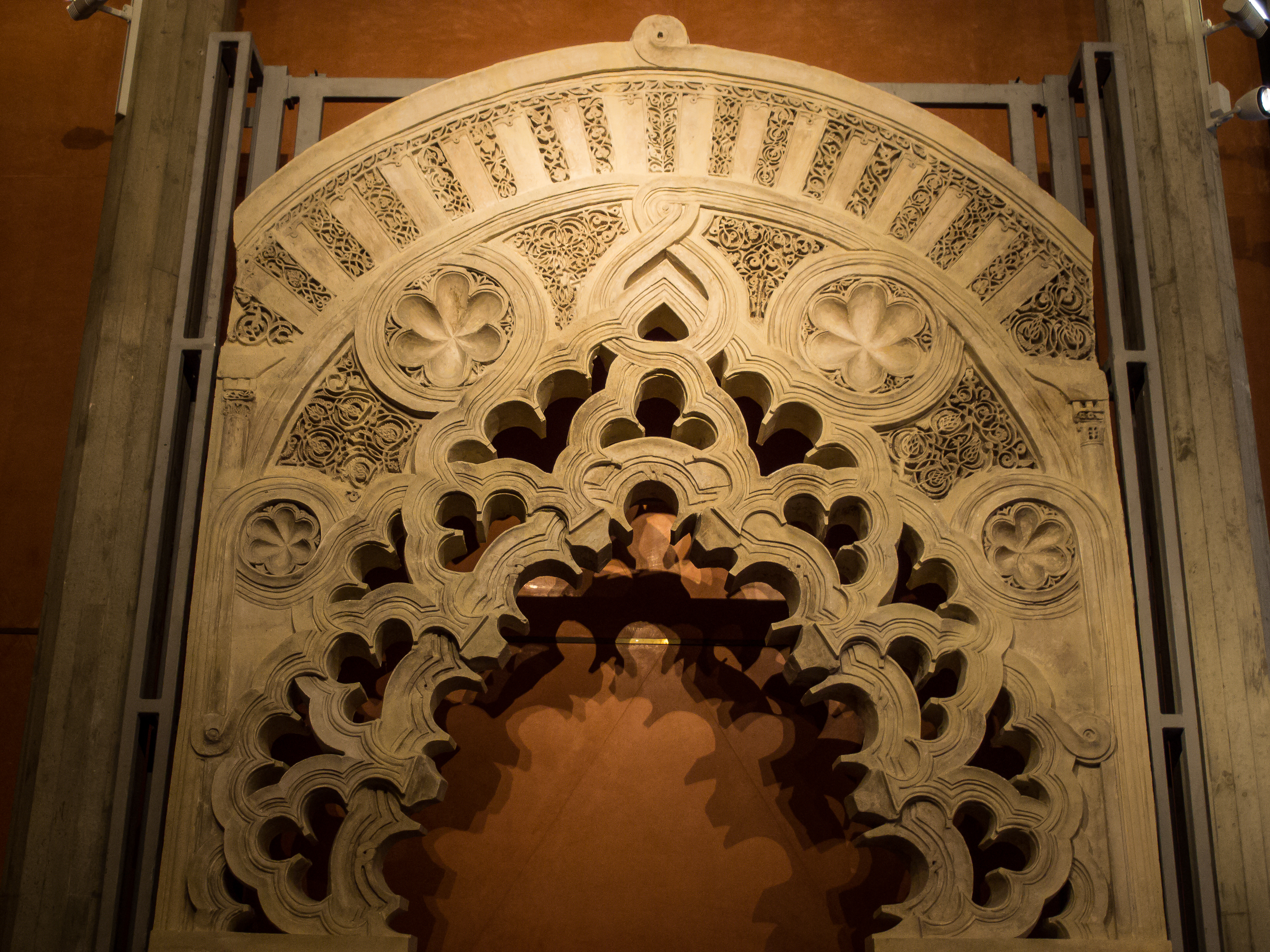
Moorish arabesques in the arches of the south portico

The rest of the walls of the mosque are decorated with blind mixtilineal arches linked and decorated on the surface with vegetable arabesques inspired by the Caliph. These arches lean on columns topped with slender basket capitals. Square marble slabs cover the bottom of the walls.

All this is topped with interlocking polyblocked arches, which are not all blind, because those in the chamfered corners show the angles of the square structure. This gallery is the only one that preserves remains of the pictorial decoration of the 11th century, whose motifs were rescued by Francisco Íñiguez Almech when removing the liming that covered the walls after conversion to a chapel. The restorer painted over the traces of Islamic remains with acrylic paint, preventing the faded, original pigment from being seen.

The dome of the mosque was not preserved, because the palace of the Catholic Monarchs was built at that level. However, the characteristic octagonal plan suggests that it would have looked like existing ones in the maqsurah of the mosque of Córdoba, a dome of interlaced semicircular arches forming an octagon in the center. Francisco Íñiguez created a detachable plaster dome. In 2006, Bernabé Cabañero Subiza, C. Lasa Gracia, and J. L. Mateo Lázaro postulated that "the ribs of the vault [...] should have the section of horseshoe arches forming an eight-pointed star pattern with a dome agglomerated in the center, like those in the two domes of the transept of the Mosque of Córdoba."

=== South side halls ===
The south portico consists of an arcade on its southern flank that gives access to a portico with two lateral stays.

This portico was the vestibule of a great south hall that would have had the same tripartite composition as exists in the north side, and of which only the arcades of access of mixtilineal arches of geometric decoration remains. This area has some of the most ornate arches. The complexity of lacing, arabesques, and carvings has a Baroque look, and is a prelude to the filigree art of the Alhambra.

== Courtyard of Santa Isabel ==
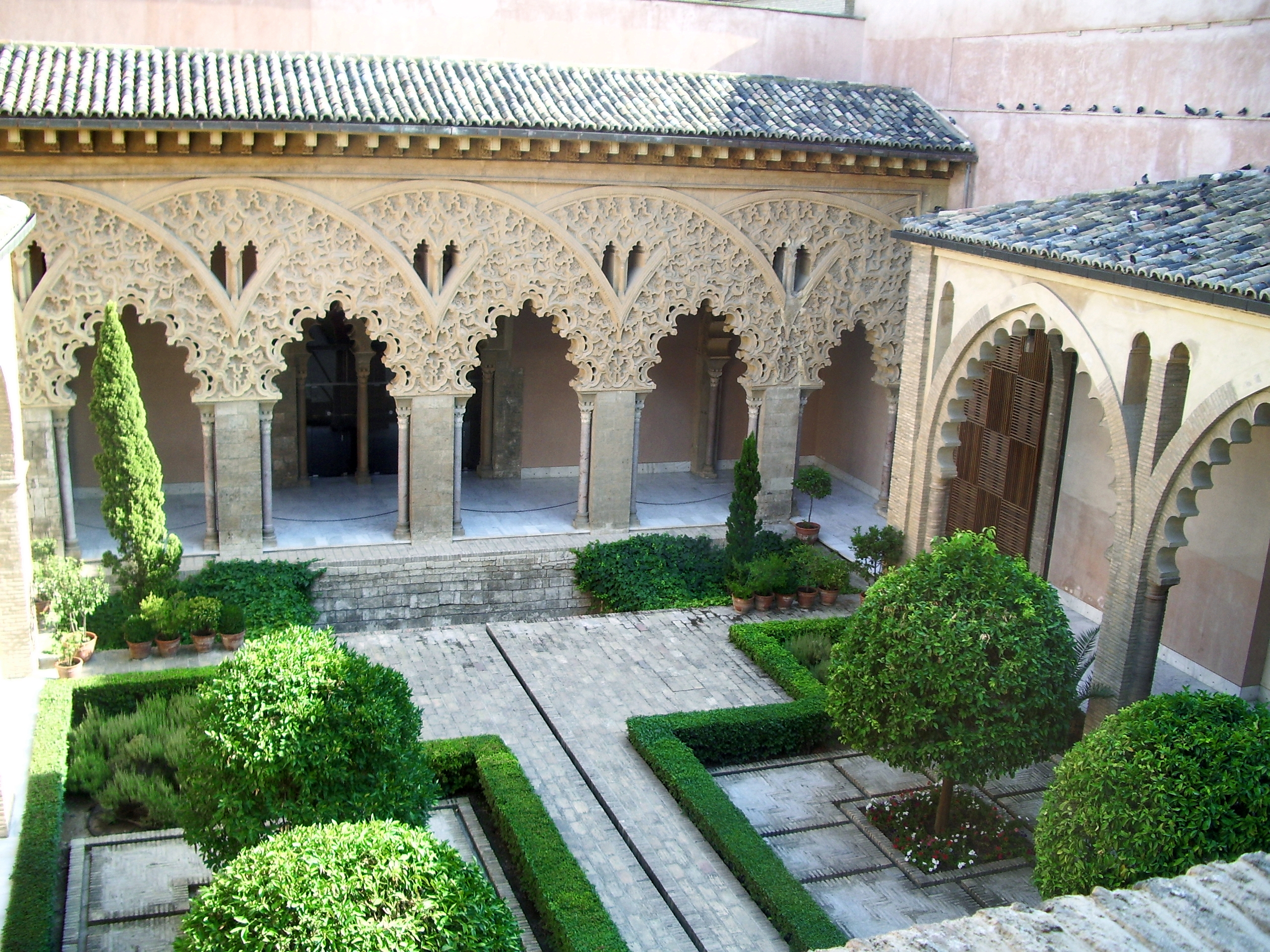
The courtyard of Santa Isabel. The central arches are moorish-taifa, and the arches on the right were built by Peter IV of Aragon.

The Courtyard of Santa Isabel is an open, landscaped space that unified the whole Taifal palace. The north and south porticos faced it, and there were probably rooms and outbuildings to the east and west.

Its name comes from the birth in the Aljafería of the Infanta Elizabeth of Aragon, who was in 1282 queen of Portugal. The original pool to the south has been conserved, whereas the one to the north was covered with a wood floor in the 14th century. The restoration tried to give the courtyard its original splendor, and for that a marble floor was arranged in the corridors that surround the orange and flower garden.

The arcade that is seen looking towards the south portico was restored by molding the original arches in the National Archaeological Museum of Madrid and in the Zaragoza Museum.

According to Christian Ewert, who has studied the arches of the Aljafería for fifteen years, the arches nearer the noble zones (Golden Hall and Mosque) tended to more closely follow the Córdoban tradition. Like the rest of the building, the courtyard was rebuilt in the 20th century based on archaeological finds.

== Palace of Peter IV of Aragon "the Ceremonious" ==
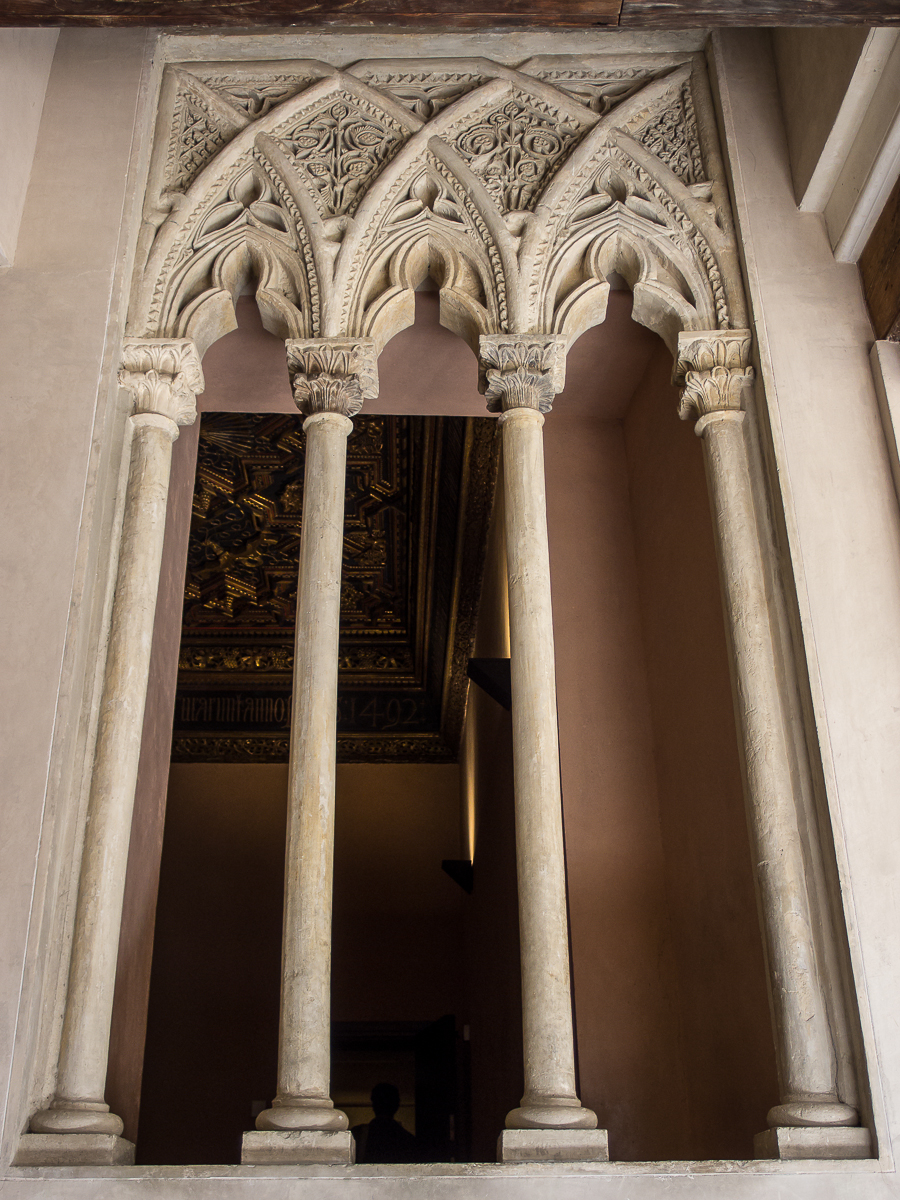
Detail of the Hall of Peter IV of Aragon, built in the mid-14th century.

After the taking of Saragossa by Alfonso the Battler in 1118, the Aljafería was used as a palace of the kings of Aragon and as a church, not being substantially modified until the 14th century with the efforts of Peter IV of Aragon "the Ceremonious".

This king extended the palatial structures in 1336 and constructed the Chapel of San Martín in the entrance courtyard to the alcázar. In this time the Aljafería is documented as the start of the route to the Cathedral of the Savior of Zaragoza, where the Aragonese monarchs were crowned and swore the Fueros of Aragon.

=== Chapel of San Martín ===
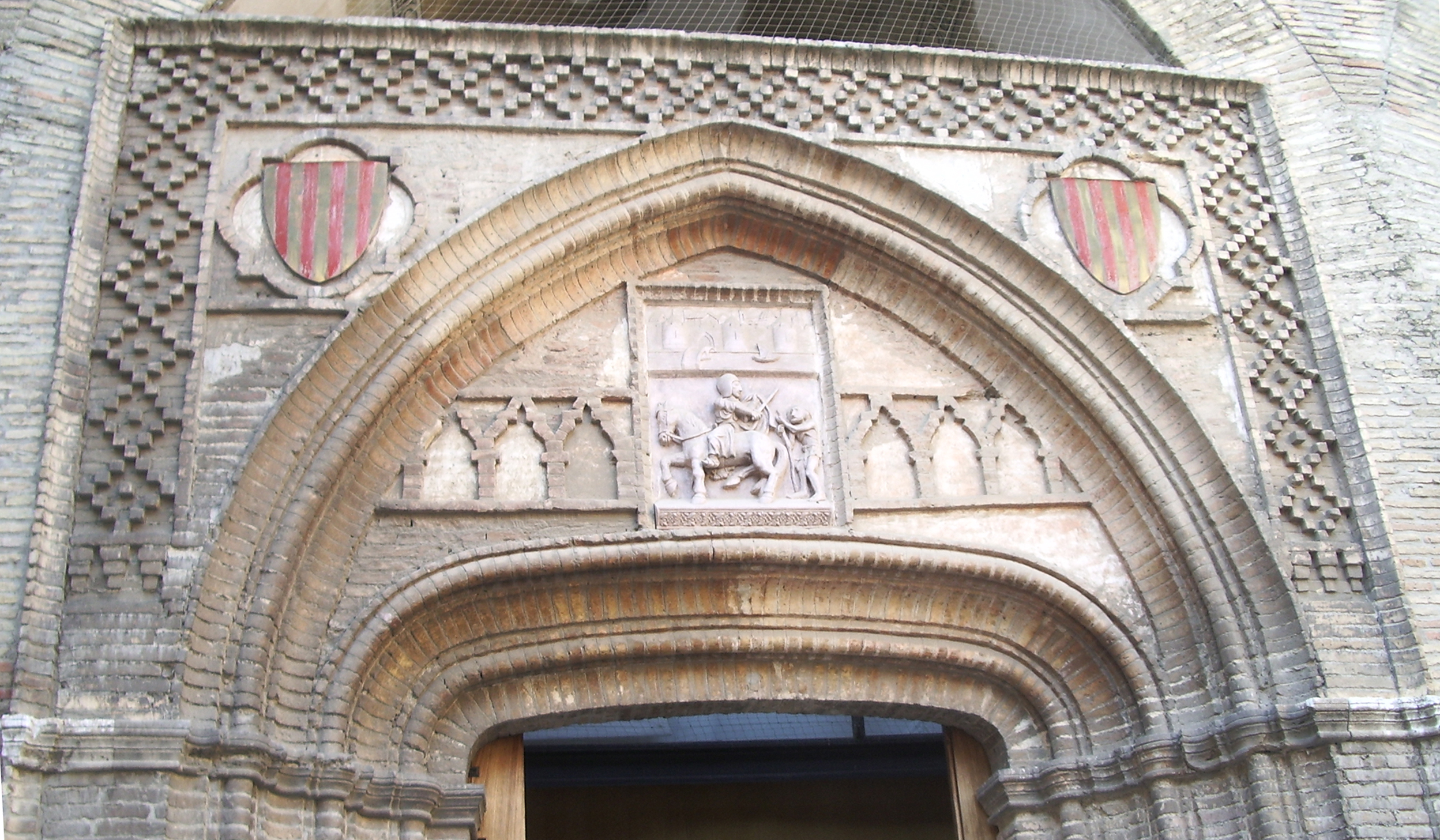
Portal of the Chapel of San Martín

The Chapel of San Martín incorporates the sides of the northwest corner of the wall, to the point that one of its towers was used as sacristy and gave its name to the courtyard that gives access to the Taifal enclosure.

The structure, of Gothic-Mudéjar style, consists of two naves of three sections each, facing to the east and supported by two pillars with semicolumns attached in the middle of the faces of the pillar, whose section is recalled in the quadrilobed design that shelters the shield of arms of the King of Aragon in the spandrels of the portal, from the first decade of the 15th century.

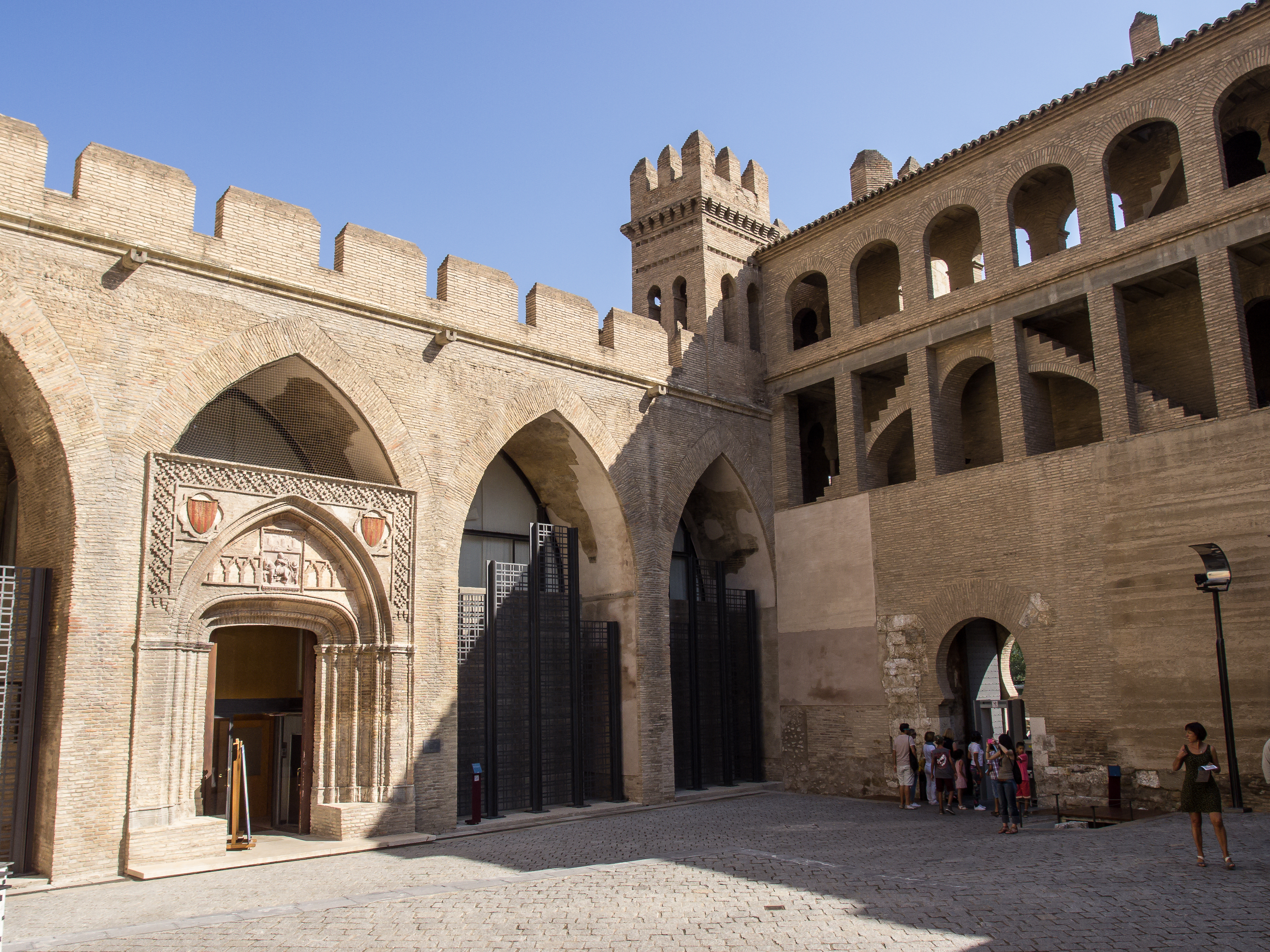
Aragonese Courtyard, Tower and Chapel of San Martín

The naves have a simple rib vault, lodged on pointed arches and bondstones, whereas the diagonals have a half-point. In the corners of the vaults are florets with the coat of arms of the Aragonese monarchy. Among the decorations, only fragments of the pictorial covering and some mixtilineal arches are preserved that were directly inspired in the Muslim palace.

The brick Mudéjar portal, built in the time of Martin of Aragon "the Humane", stands out in the last section of the south nave. This portal is framed by a recessed carpanel arch inside a larger pointed arch. Framing both, a double alfiz is decorated in a checkered pattern.

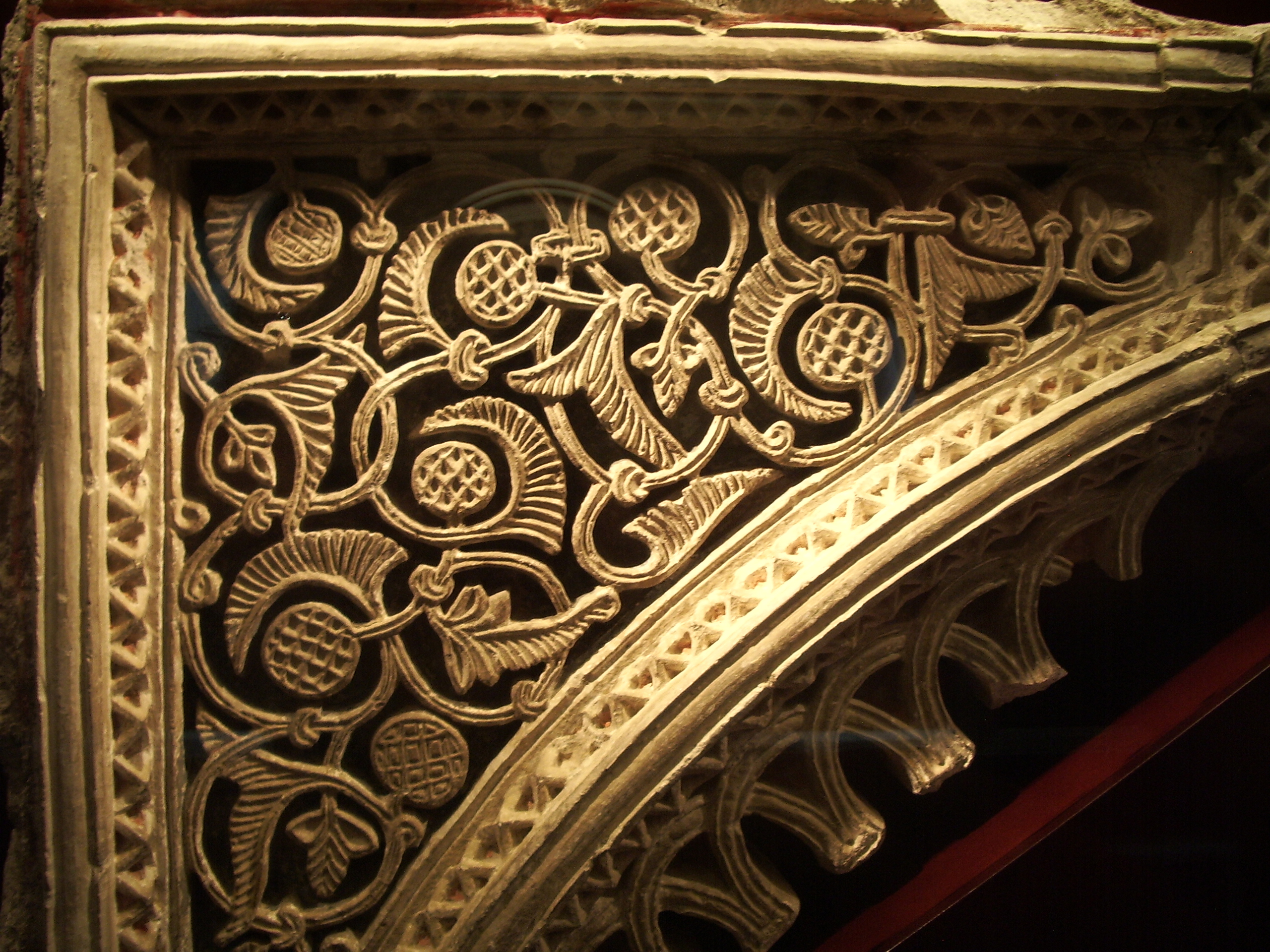
Formerly there was a chapel called Saint George's Chapel built by Peter IV of Aragon, built in 1361. The chapel was located in the hall of Saint George. This alfiz is one of two remnants of this chapel.

In the spandrels, two quadrilobed medallions appear that harbor shields with the insignia of the king of Aragon. In the resulting tympanum between the arches there is a band of interlocking mixtilineal blind arches, which refer to the series in the Banu Hud palace. This strip is interrupted by a box that houses a newly incorporated relief.

The chapel was remodeled in the 18th century, placing a nave at the front and covering the Mudéjar portal. The pillars and walls were refurbished and plastered in the Neoclassical style. All these changes were eliminated during the restorations of Francisco Íñiguez, although, by the existing photographic documentation, it is known that there was a slender tower that now appears with a crenellated finish inspired by the aspect of the Mudéjar church, and in the 18th century culminated with a curious bulbous spire.

=== Mudéjar Palace ===
The Mudéjar Palace is not an independent palace, but an extension of the Muslim palace that was still in use. Peter IV of Aragon tried to provide more spacious rooms, dining rooms, and bedrooms to the Aljafería, because the Taifal bedrooms were too small for his use.

These newer rooms are grouped on the northern sector of the Al-Andalusian palace at different elevations. This new Mudéjar structure was respectful of the preexisting construction, both in plan and elevation, and is made up of three large rectangular halls covered by aljarfes or wooden mudéjar ceilings.

Also dating from this time is the western arcade of pointed arches of the Patio de Santa Isabel, intrados in lobed arcs, and a small, square bedroom covered with an octagonal dome of wood and a curious entrance door with a lobed intrados arch circumscribed in a very fine alfiz, with an arabesque spandrel. This door leads to a triple loggia of semicircular arches. The bedroom is located above the mosque.

== Palace of the Catholic Monarchs ==
In the last years of the 15th century the Catholic Monarchs ordered the construction of a royal palace on the north wing of the Al-Andalusian enclosure, configuring a second layout superposed on that of the existing palace. The building replaced the upper parts of the Taifal rooms, where the beams were inserted that would support the new palace.

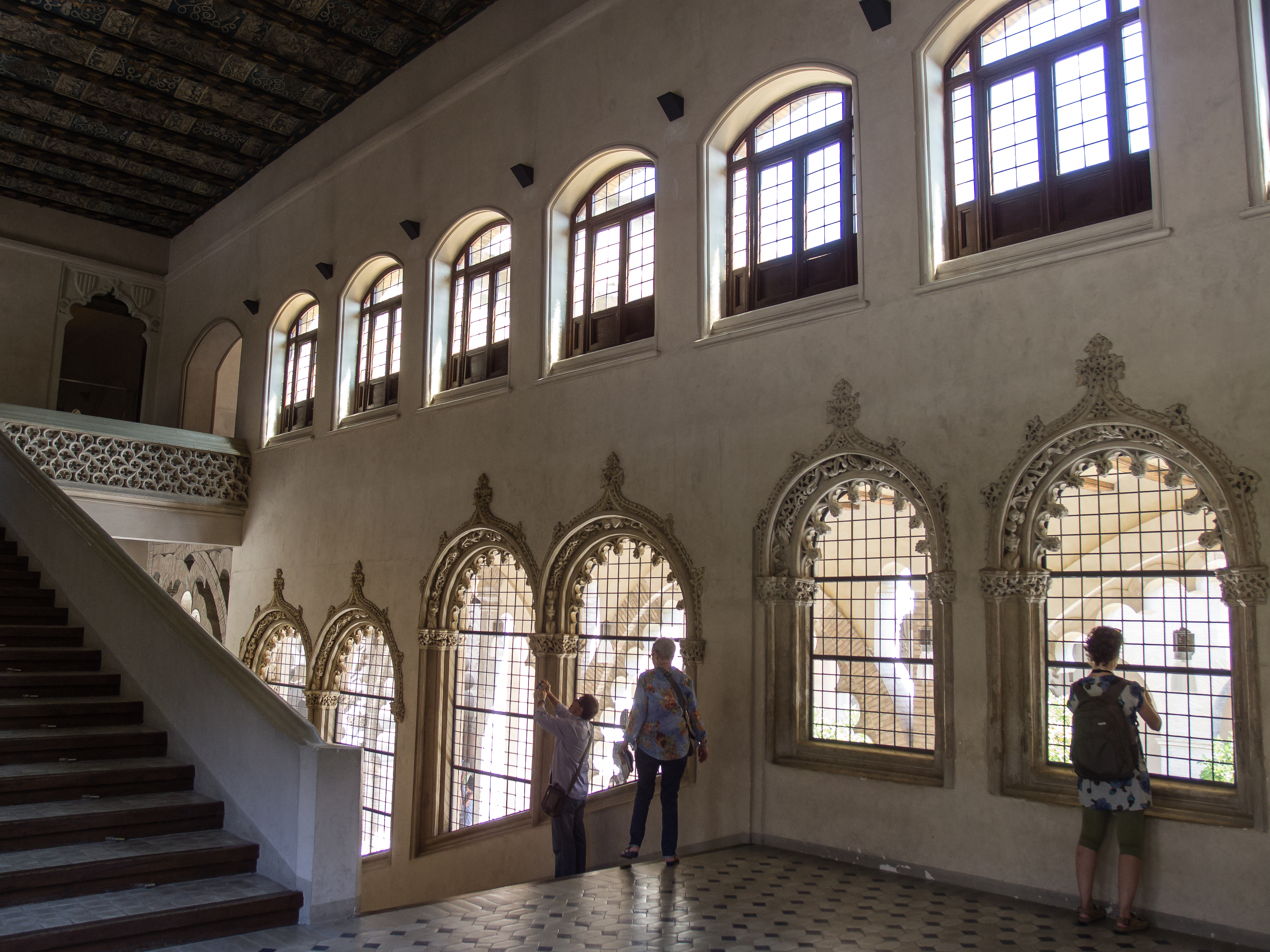
Windows in a section built by the Catholic Monarchs

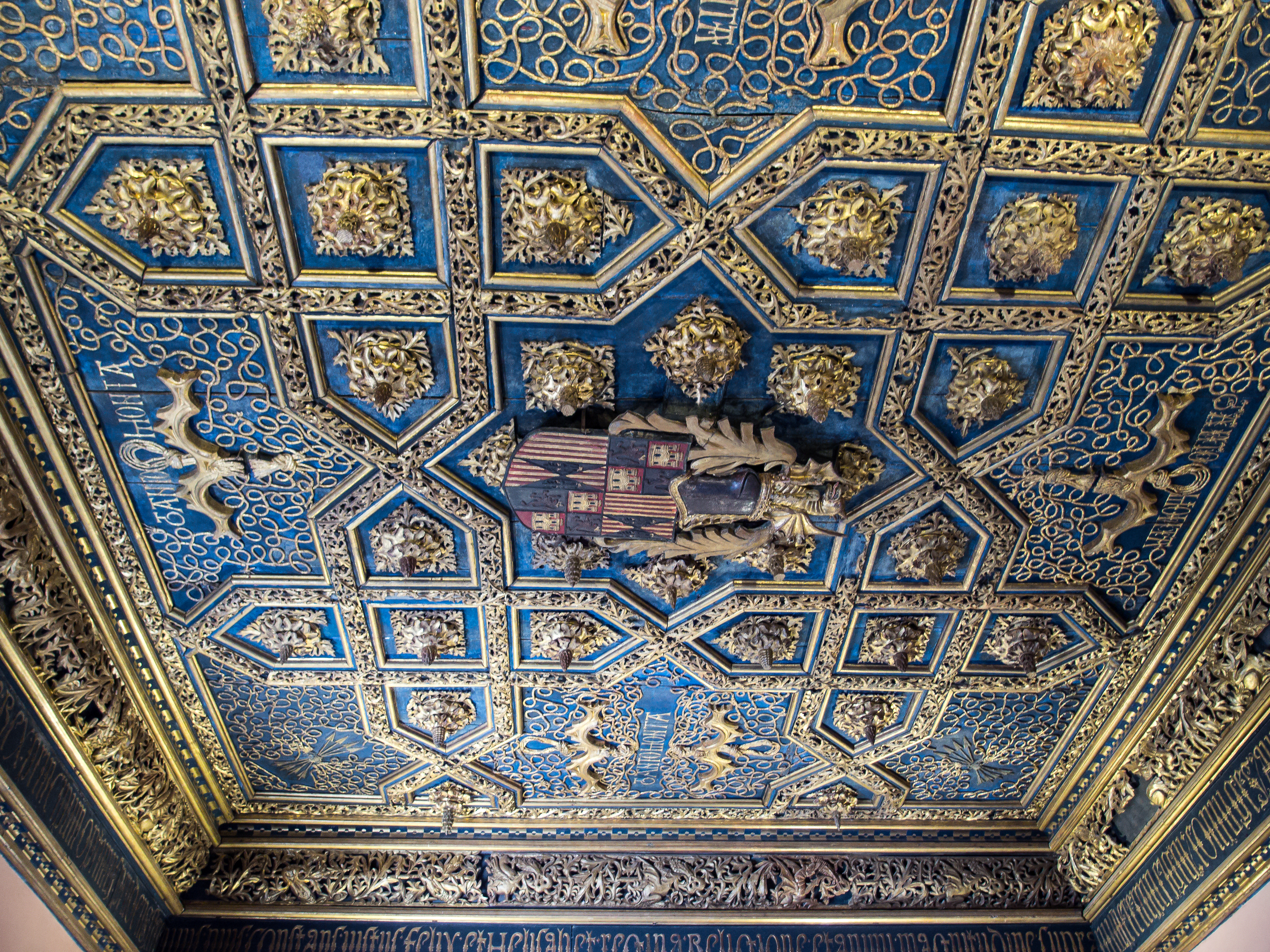
Roof of the Hall of los Pasos Perdidos, Palace of the Catholic Monarchs, from around 1488–1495.

The construction lasted from 1488 to 1495 and was undertaken by Mudéjar masters, maintaining the tradition of Mudéjar bricklayers in the Aljafería.

The palace is accessed by climbing the noble staircase, a monumental structure composed of two large sections with geometric yeseria gables illuminated by half-angled windows with small decorations of leaves and stems with Gothic and Mudéjar influences, topped in a crochet-like pattern on the key of the arches.

The grandiose ceiling, as in the rest of the palace buildings, is covered with cross-vaulted vaults arranged between the girders. It is decorated with tempera painting with iconographic motifs related to the Catholic Monarchs: the yoke and the arrows alternate with Grisaille squares, typical decoration of the Renaissance.

The stairs give access to a corridor in the first floor that connects to the palatial buildings proper. It opens to a gallery of torso shaft columns that rest on footings with anthropomorphic reliefs at their ends. To support this and the rest of the new structures it was necessary to cut through the high areas of the Taifal halls of the 11th century and to build before the north portico five massive octagonal pillars that, along with some pointed archways behind them, form a new ante-porch that unites the two Al-Andalusian perpendicular pavilions.

The main entrance to the Throne Room is highlighted by a trilobed recessed arch with a five-lobed tympanum, at the center of which is represented the coat of arms of the monarchy of the Catholic Monarchs, which includes the coats of arms of the kingdoms of Castile, León, Aragon, Sicily, and Granada, supported by two lieutenant lions. The rest of the decorative field is finished with delicate vegetal ornamentation, which reappears in the capitals of the jambs. The entire portal is made of hardened plaster, which is the predominant material in the interior of the Aljafería, as Mudéjar craftspeople perpetuated the materials and techniques that are common in Islam. In the same wall as the entranceway are two large windows with triple mixtilineal arches.

Across from the gallery are three small, square rooms that precede to the great Throne Room, these are called "rooms of the lost steps". These have large latticework windows that overlook the Courtyard of San Martín, and would have served as waiting rooms for those wanting an audience with the kings.

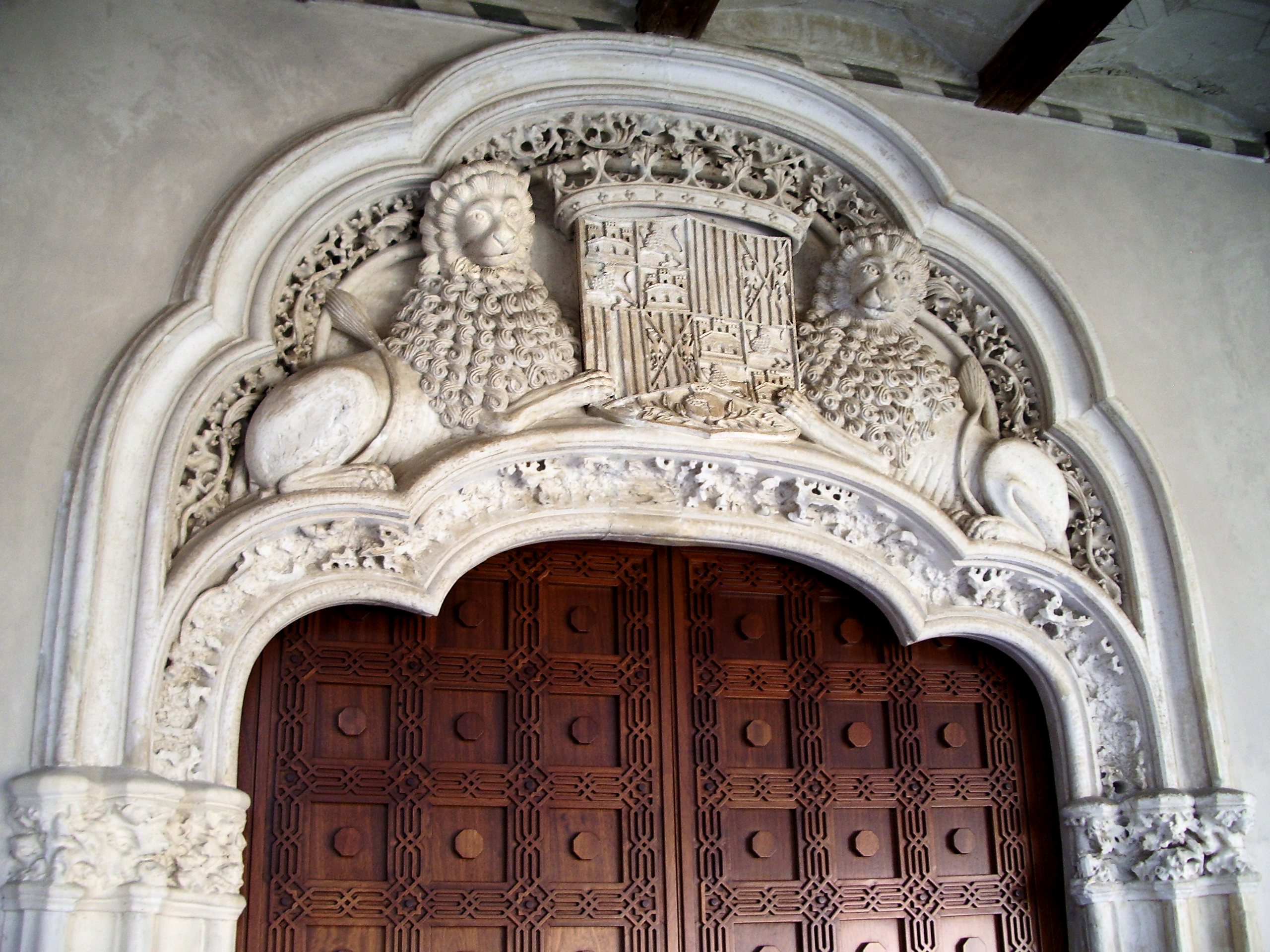
Arch over the main portal

Today only two rooms are accessible because the third one was closed when replacing the dome of the mosque. Its roof was moved to a room adjoining the Throne Room.

One of the most valuable elements of these rooms are their floors, which originally had square azulejos with colorful hexagonal ceramic patches. They were made in the historic pottery of Loza de Muel at the end of the 15th century. Preserved fragments were used to restore the entire floor with ceramics that mimic the shape and layout of the former floor.

Also remarkable are the Mudéjar-Catholic Monarchs style ceilings, constituted by three magnificent taujeles made by Aragonese Mudéjar carpenters. These ceilings have geometric grids of carved wood, painted and gilded with gold leaf, whose moldings show the heraldic motifs of the Catholic Monarchs: the yoke, the arrows and the Gordian knot united to the motto "Tanto monta" (relating to undoing the Gordian knot, both to cut it as to untie it, according to the anecdote attributed to Alexander the Great), as well as many leaflet florets finished with hanging pineapples.

=== Throne Room ===
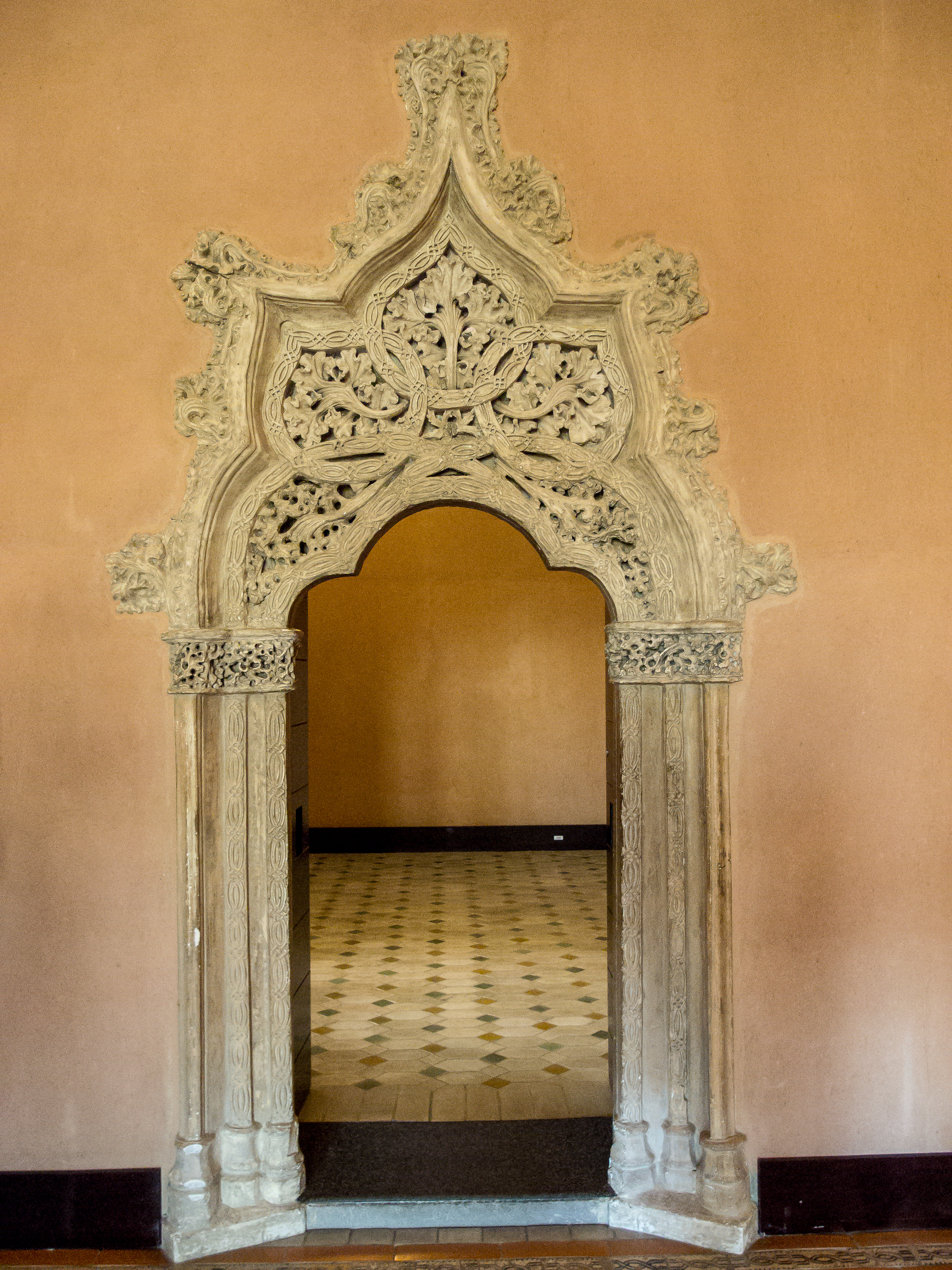
Portal in the Throne Room, built by the Catholic Monarchs

The ceiling of the Throne Room is elaborately decorated. It is 20 metres (66 feet) long 8 metres wide and its Artesonado coffered ceiling is supported by thick beams and sleepers decorated with a lace pattern that forms eight-pointed stars, while generating thirty large, deep square coffers. Inside the coffers are inscribed octagons with a central curly leafed flower that finishes in large hanging pine cones that symbolize fertility and immortality. This ceiling was reflected in the floor, which reproduces the thirty squares with inscribed octagons.

Under the ceiling there is an airy gallery of arches with open windows, from which the guests could observe the royal ceremonies. Finally, all this structure is based on an arrocabe with moldings carved with vegetal and zoomorphic themes (including cardina, branches, fruits of the vine, winged dragons, and fantastic animals), and in the frieze that surrounds the whole perimeter of the room, there is Gothic calligraphy that reads:

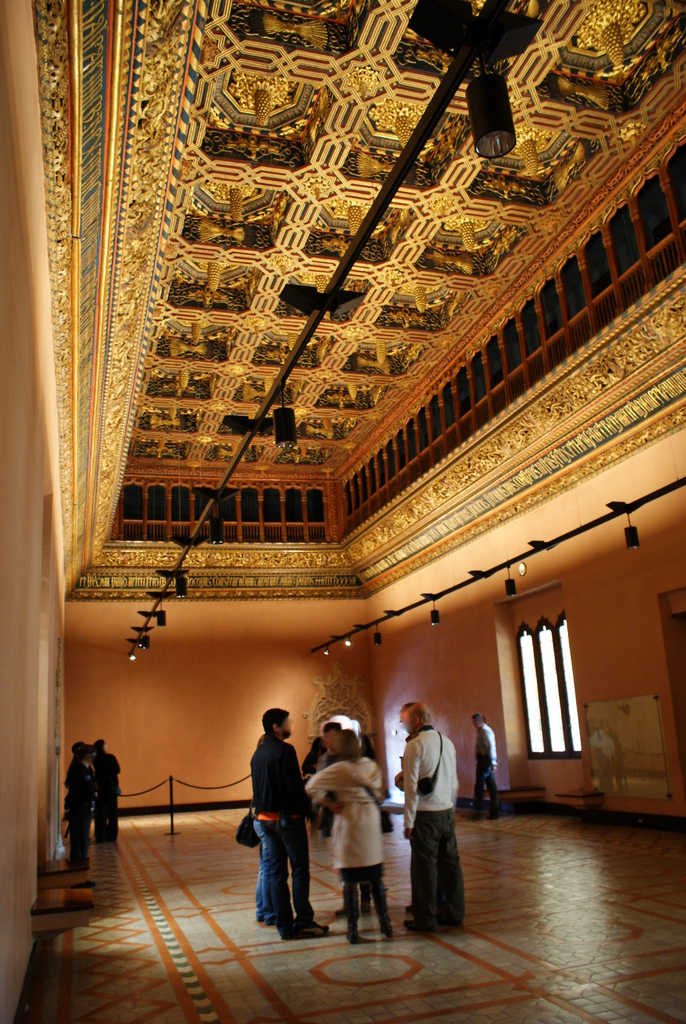
Grand Hall of the Palace of the Catholic Monarchs

Ferdinandus, Hispaniarum, Siciliae, Corsicae, Balearumque rex, principum optimus, prudens, strenuus, pius, constans, iustus, felix, et Helisabeth regina, religione et animi magnitudine supra mulierem, insigni coniuges, auxiliante Christo, victoriosissimi, post liberatam a mauris Bethycam, pulso veteri feroque hoste, hoc opus construendum curarunt, anno salutis MCCCCLXXXXII.

The translation of this inscription is:

Ferdinand, King of Spain, Sicily, Corsica and the Balearic Islands, the best of princes, prudent, courageous, pious, constant, just, jocose, and Isabella, queen, superior to all woman because of her pity and greatness of spirit, distinguished spouses very victorious with the help of Christ, after liberating Andalusia from the Moors, expelled the old and ferocious enemy, ordered to build this work in the year of the Salvation of 1492.

== Early-modern and modern times ==
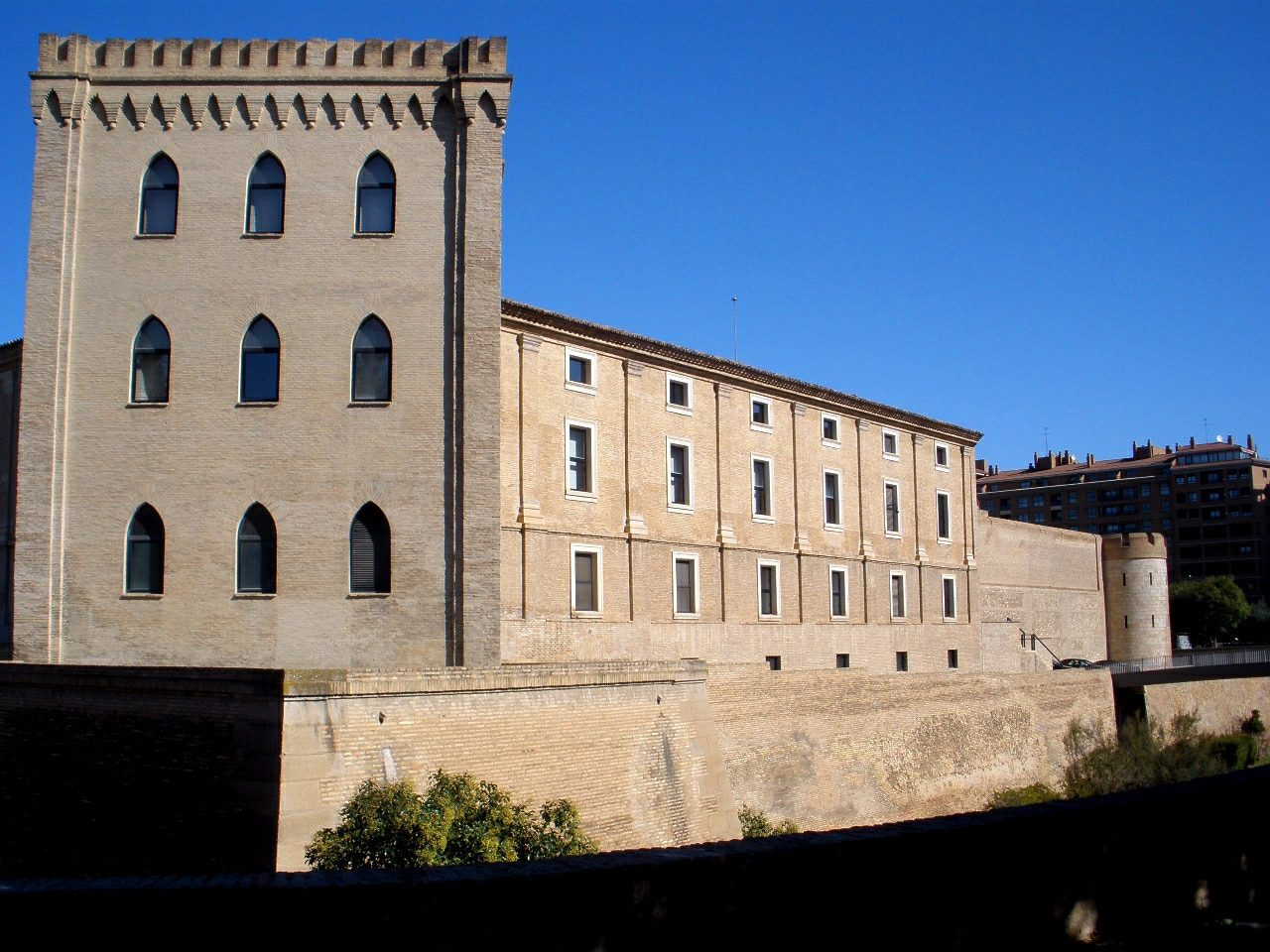
One of the four Gothic Revival towers built in 1862

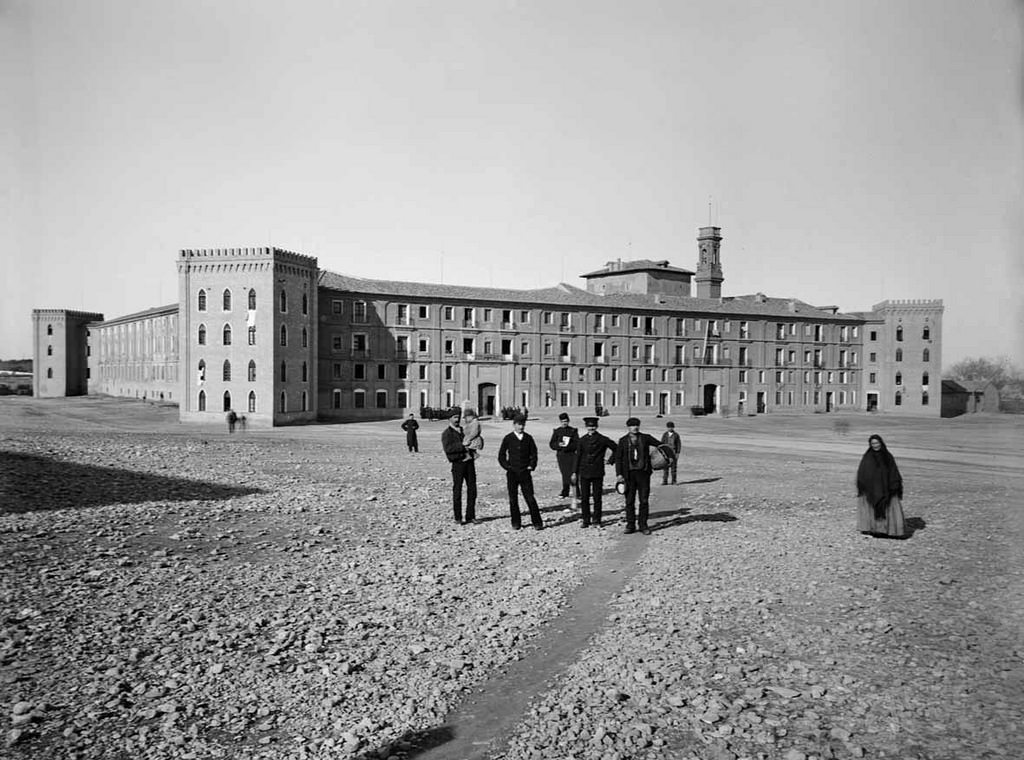
The Aljafería in 1889

In 1486, the area of the Courtyard of San Martín was assigned as the headquarters of the Tribunal of the Holy Office of the Inquisition and facilities were installed adjacent to the courtyard to house the officers of this organization. This is likely the first use of the Tower of the Troubadour as a prison.

In 1591, in the events known as the Alterations of Aragon, the persecuted secretary of King Philip II, Antonio Pérez, took advantage of the Privilege of Manifestation observed by the Fuero of Aragon in order to elude the royal troops. However, the Tribunal of the Inquisition had jurisdiction over all the fueros of the kingdoms, so he was held in a cell of the inquisitorial headquarters of the Aljafería. This provoked a popular uprising over what was seen as a violation of the law, and the Aljafería was assaulted to rescue him. The royal army forcefully put down the revolt, and Philip II decided to consolidate the Aljafería as a fortified citadel under his authority to prevent similar revolts.

The design of the military building was entrusted to the Italian-Sienese military engineer Tibúrcio Spannocchi. He built a set of rooms attached to the south and east walls that hid the ultrasemicircular turrets in its interior, although it did not affect those turrets that flanked the entrance door on the east. A marlon wall was erected around the entire building, leaving a round space inside and ending at its four corners in four pentagonal bastions, whose bases can be seen today. The entire complex was surrounded by a twenty metre wide moat crossed by two drawbridges on the east and north flanks.

No further substantial changes were made until 1705, when during the War of the Spanish Succession it housed two companies of French troops that raised the parapets of the lower wall of the moat following a design by the military engineer Dezveheforz.

However, a complete transformation of the structure into barracks took place in 1772 at the initiative of Charles III of Spain. All the walls were remodeled to a style that can still be seen on the western wall, and the interior spaces were used as living quarters for soldiers and officers. A large parade ground was set up in the western third of the palace with the rooms of the different companies surrounding it. The renovations were made with simplicity and functionality, following the rationalist spirit of the second half of the 18th century and reflecting the practical purpose for the area. The only further change was in 1862 when Isabella II added four Gothic-Revival towers, of which the ones located in the north-western and south-western corner still stand today.

In 1845, Mariano Nougués Secall warned of the deterioration of the al-Andalusian and Mudéjar remains of the palace in his report entitled Descripción e historia del castillo de la Aljafería, which urged that this historical-artistic ensemble be preserved. Queen Isabella II contributed funds for the restoration, and a commission was created in 1848 to undertake the project; but in 1862 the Aljafería passed from the property of the Royal Patrimony to the Ministry of War, which stopped the restoration and would further damage the structure.

The deterioration continued until 1947, when restoration began under the architect Francisco Íñiguez. The restoration was started and completed during the government of Francisco Franco.

In the 1960s it was used as a military barracks, and the decoration was covered with plaster for protection.

In 1984, a regional parliamentary commission assigned to find a permanent headquarters for the Cortes of Aragon recommended locating the autonomous parliament in the Aljafería Palace. The City Council of Zaragoza, the owner of the building, agreed to transfer a section of the building to the council for a period of 99 years. In this way the section was adapted and the building again restored by Ángel Peropadre, archeologist Juan Antonio Souto, Luis Franco Lahoz, and Mariano Pemán Gavín. The Aljafería was declared an artistic and historical monument in 1998 in an event with Philip, Prince of Asturias.

== Gallery ==
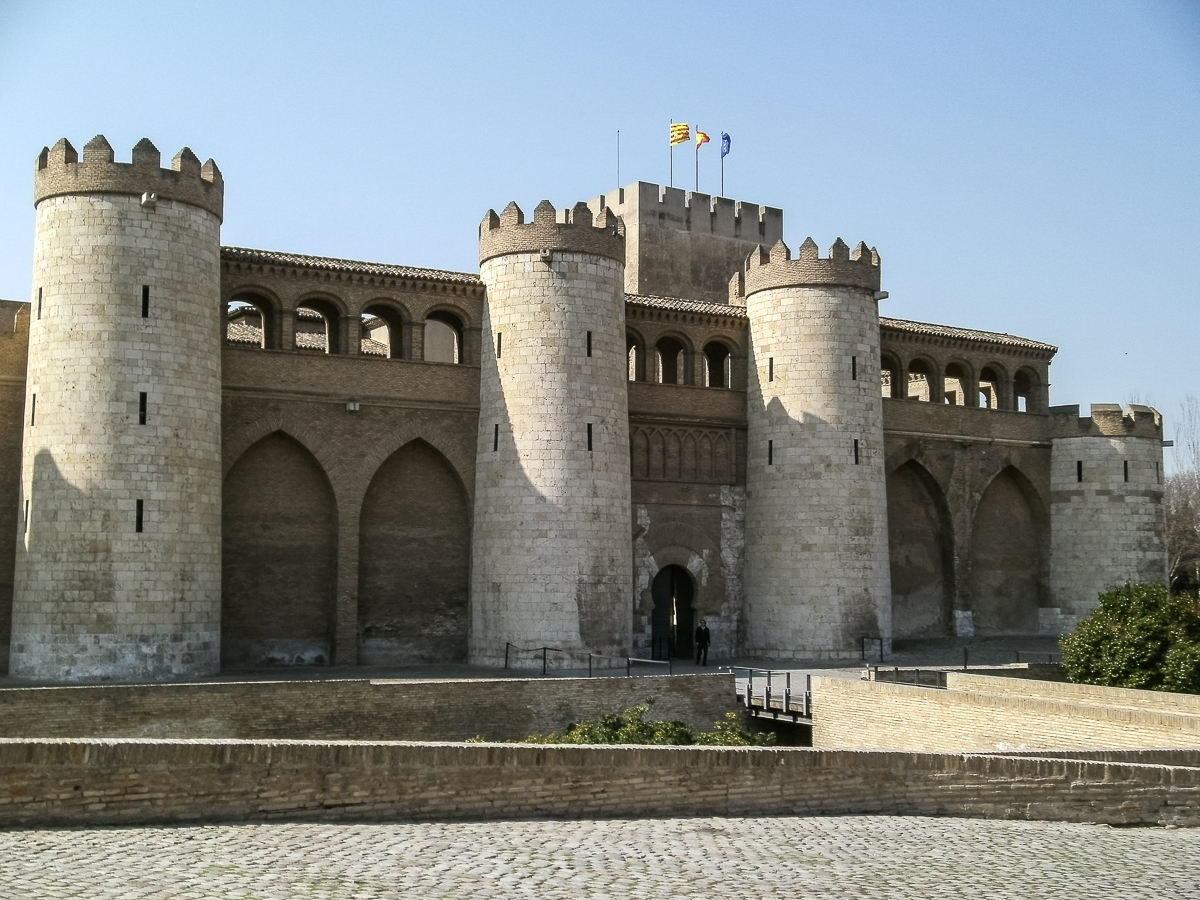
The exterior facade of the Aljafería was rebuilt in the 20th century.

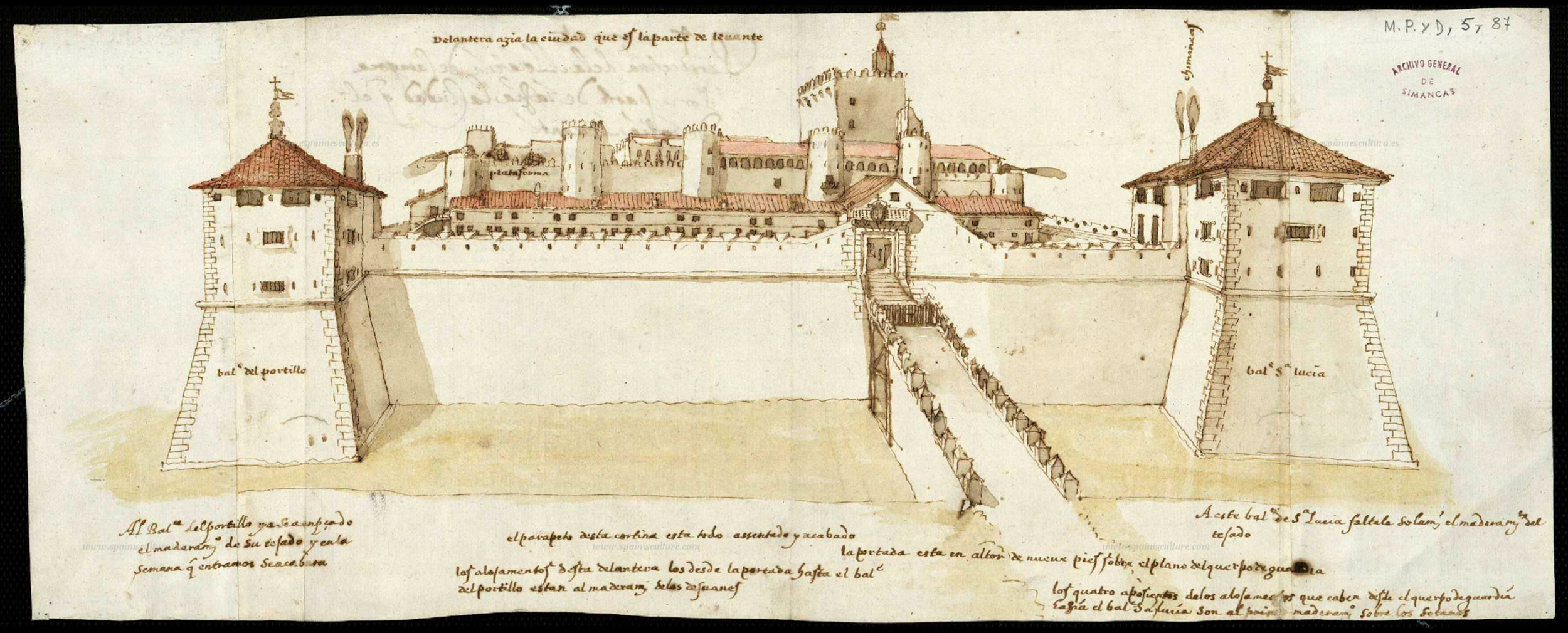
In 1593 Philip II of Spain built a citadel around the Aljafería, as seen in this 16th-century drawing.

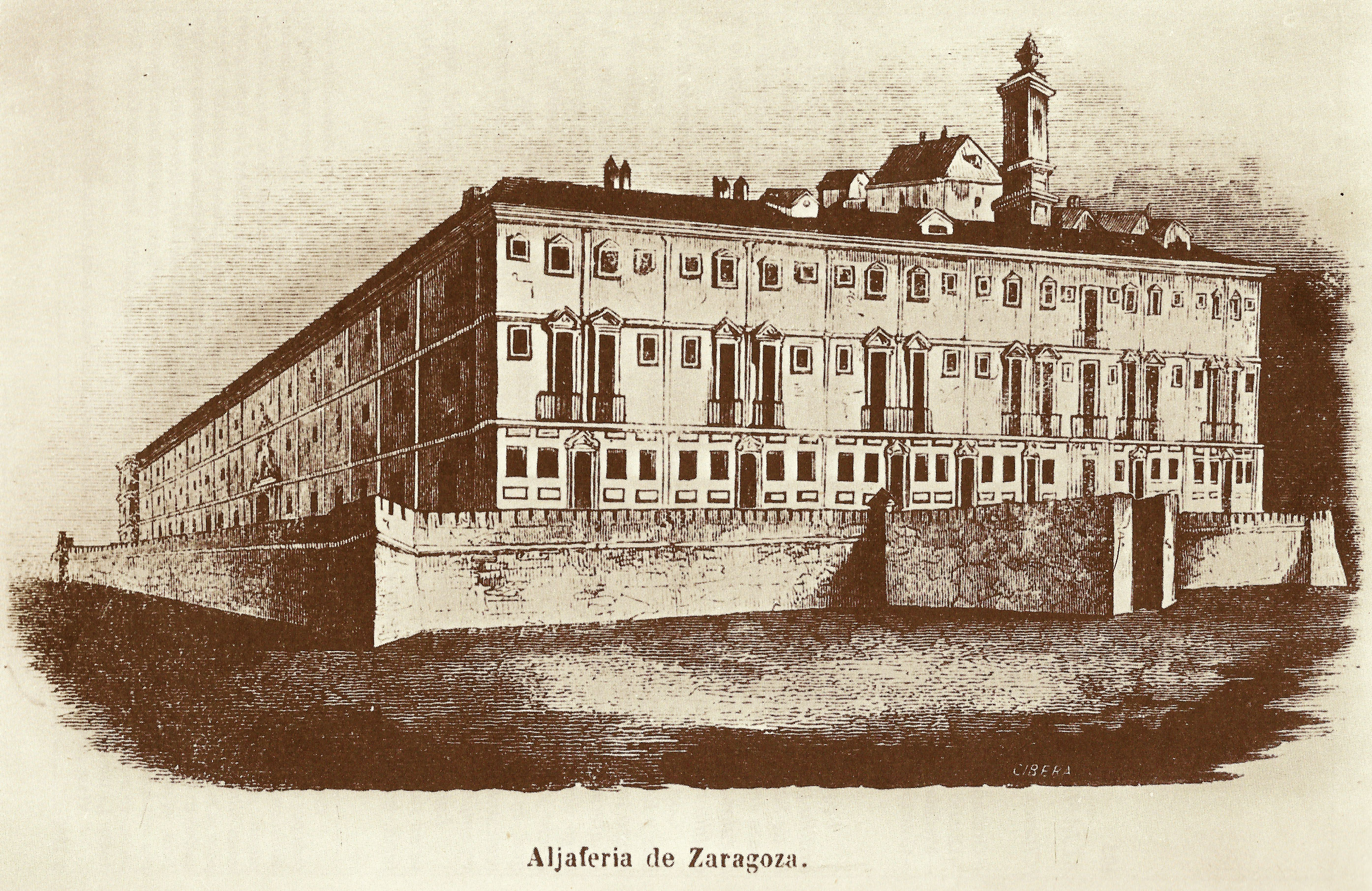
The Aljafería in 1848

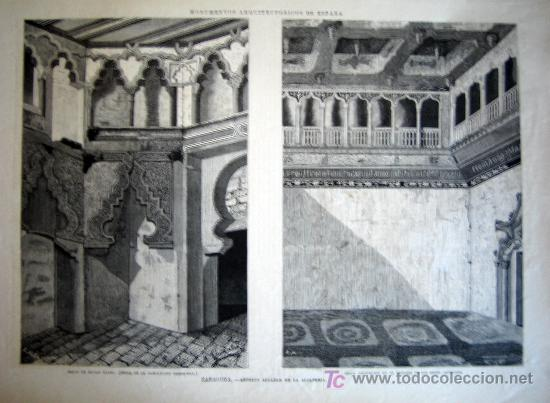
Interior of the Aljafería in 1879

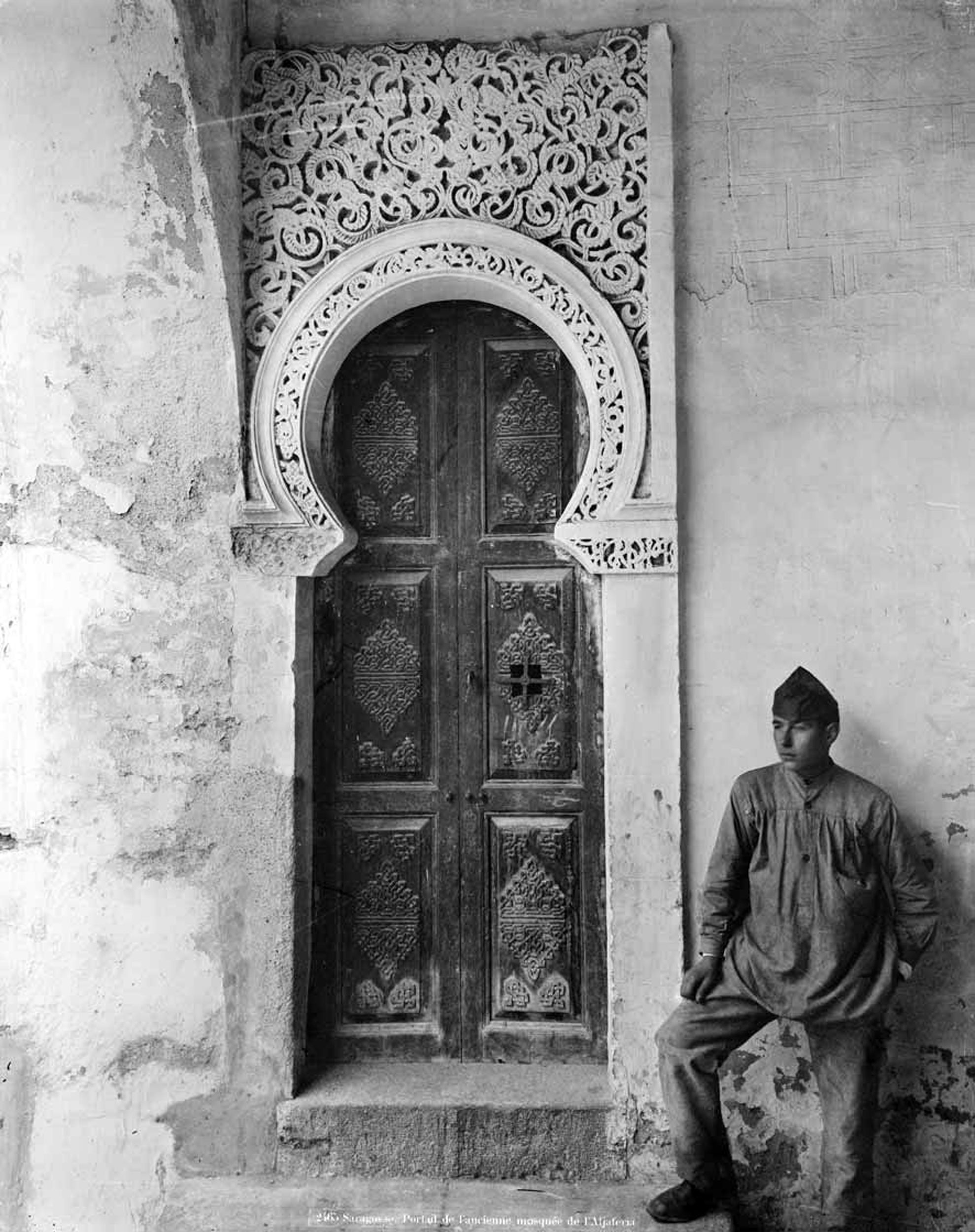
Interior of the Aljafería in 1889

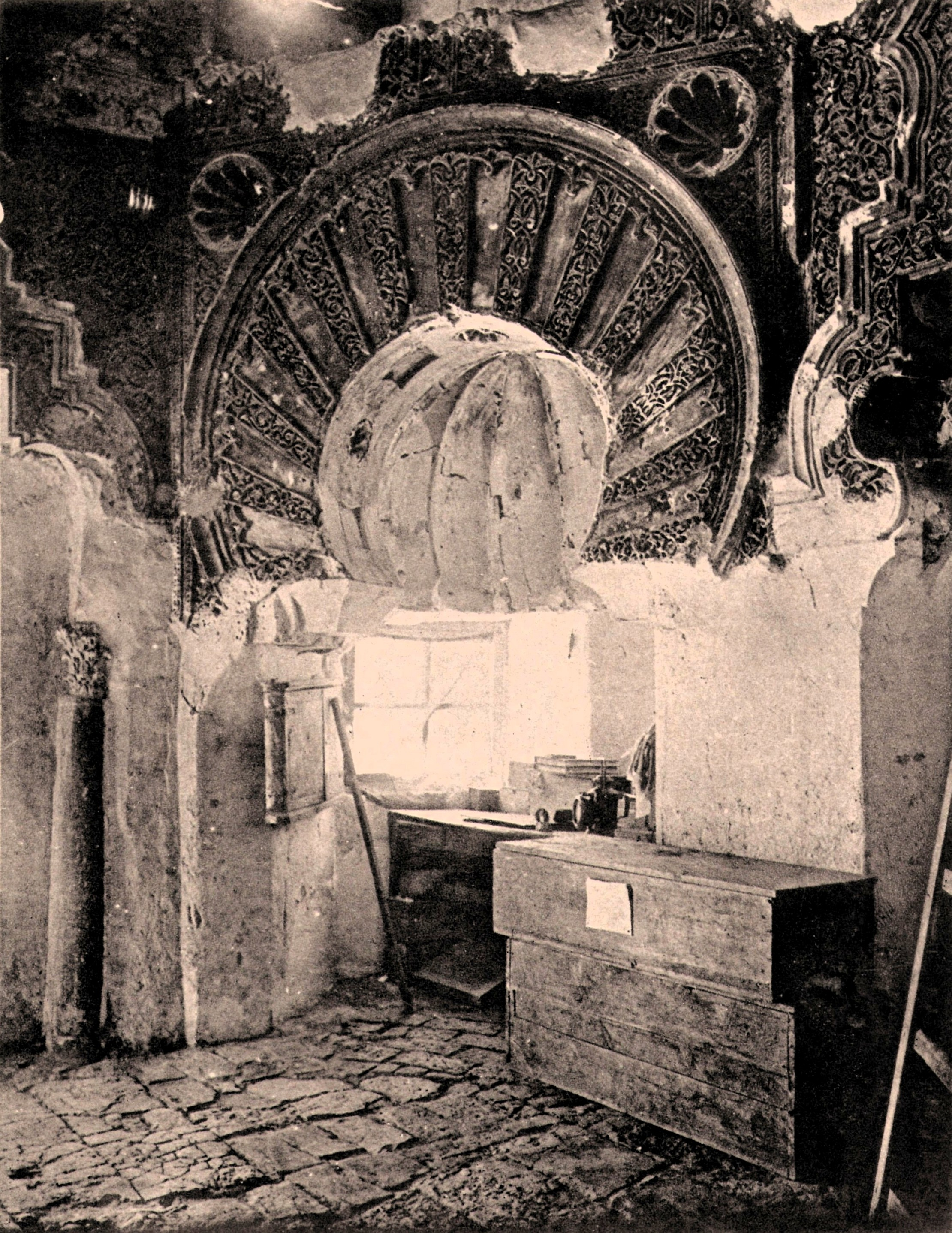
Interior of the mosque in 1891

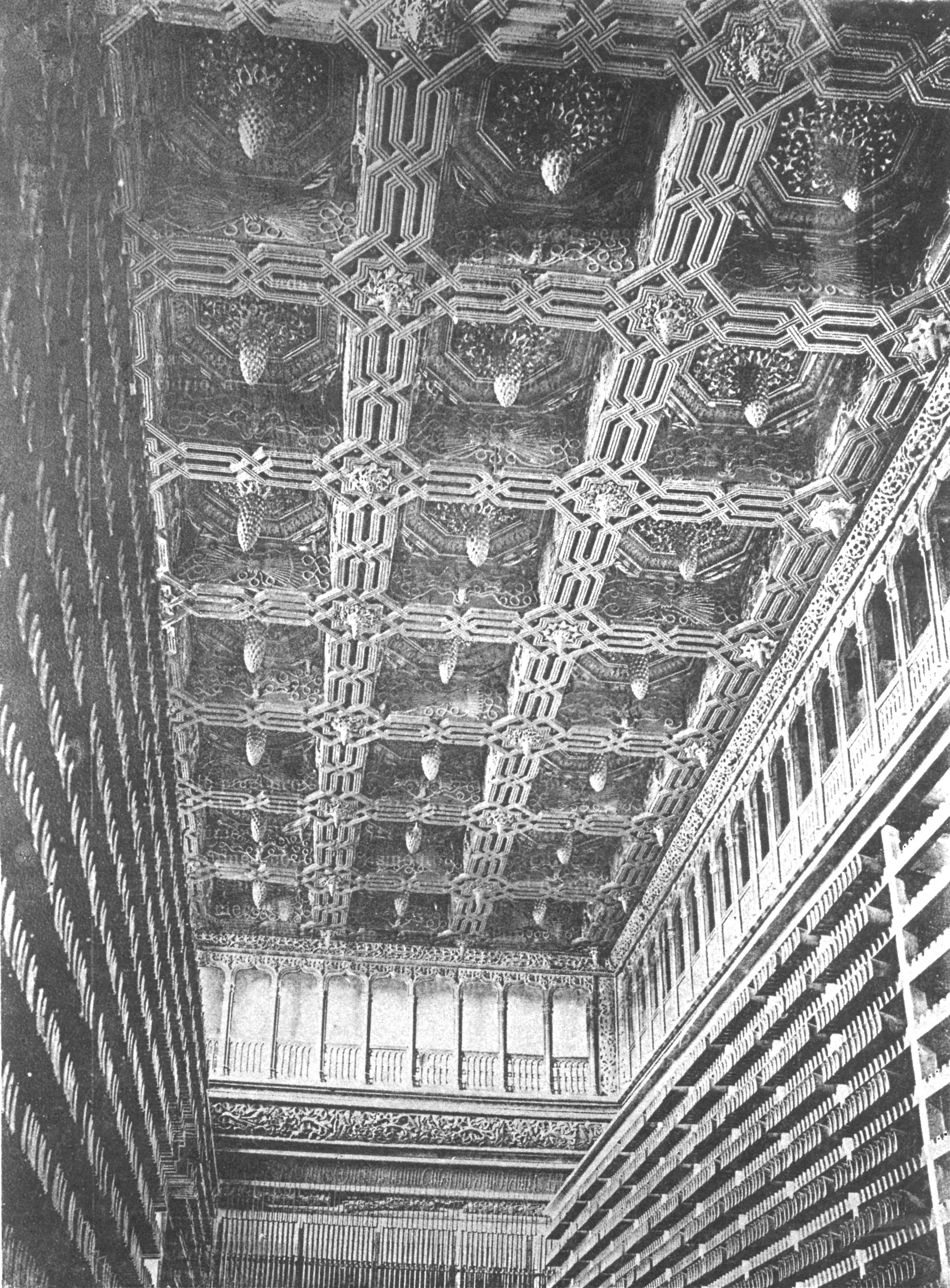
Ceiling of the Grand Hall of the Palace of the Catholic Monarchs in 1890

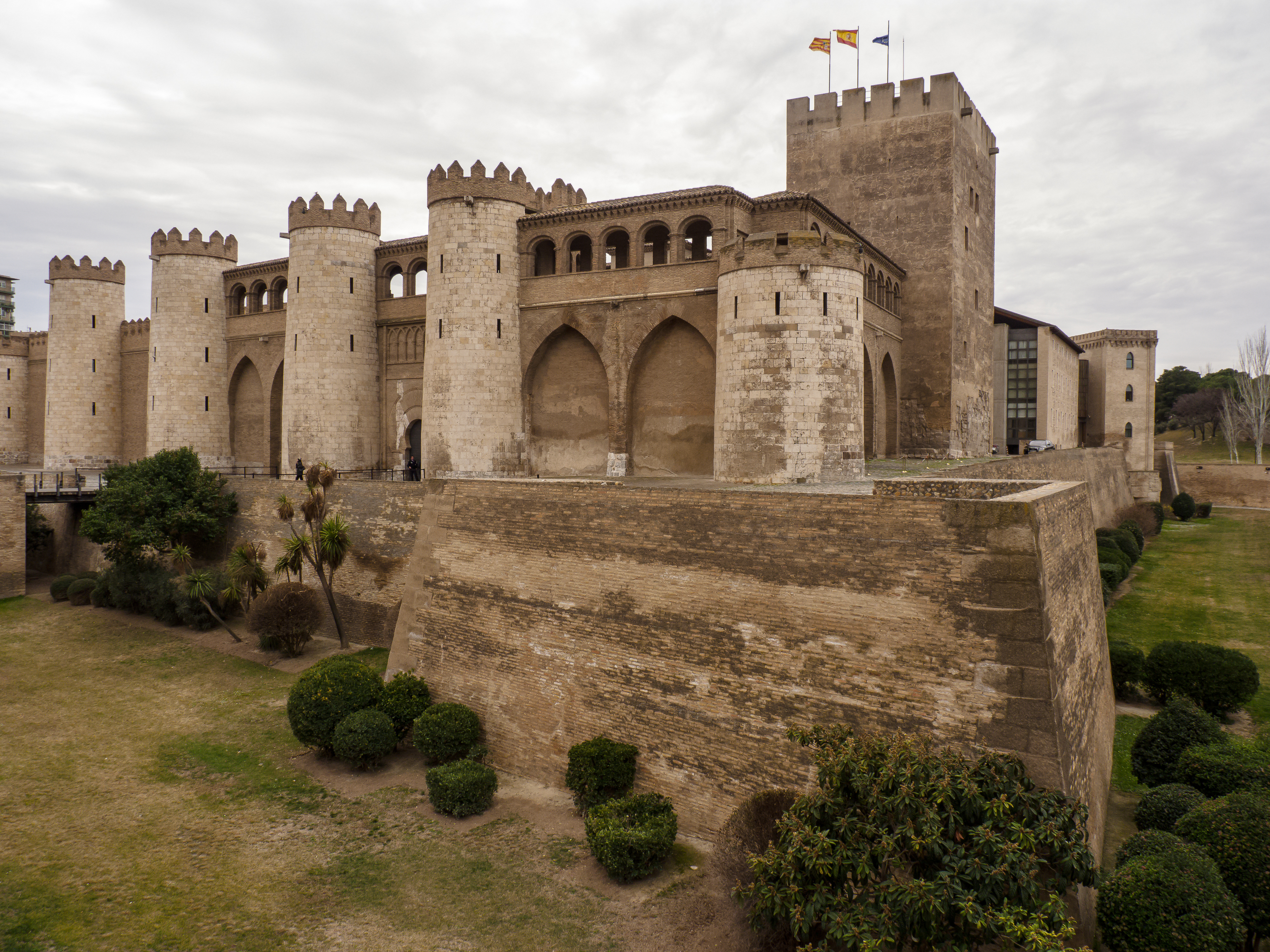
The moat added during the reign of Philip II

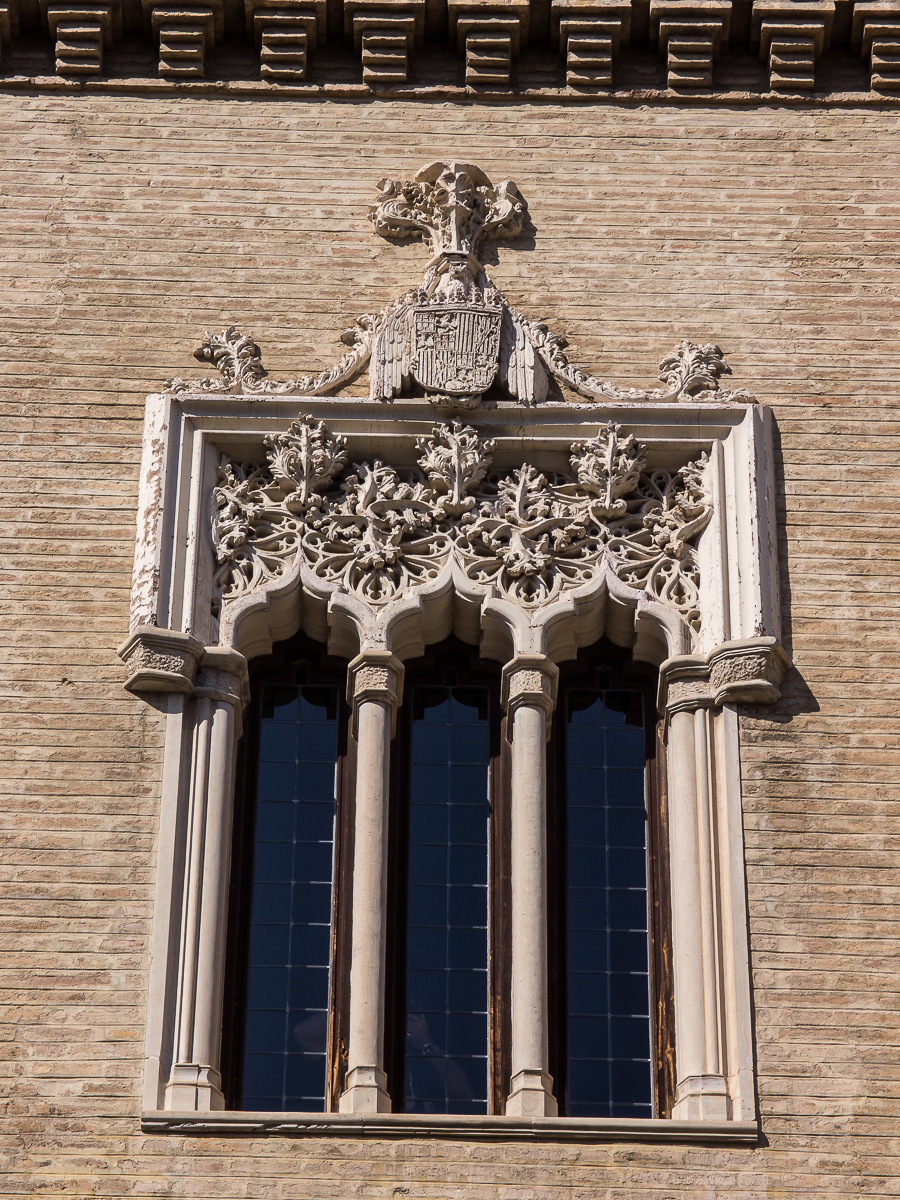
Gothic window built by the Catholic Monarchs in 1512

== See also ==
- High medieval domes

== Bibliography ==
- BORRÁS GUALIS, Gonzalo (1991). "La ciudad islámica". Guillermo Fatás (dir.) Guía histórico-artística de Zaragoza. Zaragoza City Council. pp. 71–100. 3rd ed. ISBN 978-84-86807-76-4
- BIEL IBÁÑEZ, María Pilar (2008). "Nuevas noticias sobre el palacio de la Aljafería". Guillermo Fatás (dir.) Guía histórico-artística de Zaragoza. Zaragoza City Council. pp. 711–727. 4th ed. ISBN 978-84-7820-948-4.
- CABAÑERO SUBIZA, Bernabé et al. (1998), La Aljafería. I. Zaragoza: Cortes de Aragón. 1998. ISBN 978-84-86794-97-2
- EXPÓSITO SEBASTIÁN et al. (2006). La Aljafería de Zaragoza. Zaragoza: Cortes de Aragón. 2006 (6ª ed.) ISBN 978-84-86794-13-2
