= Perpend stone =

Rock whose length extends the width of a wall to hold it laterally

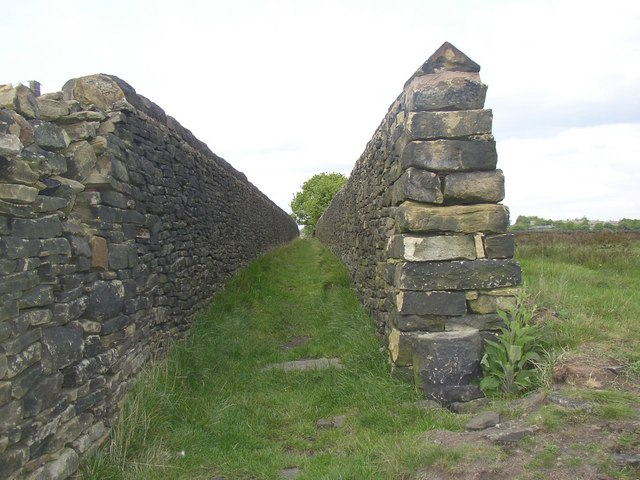
The bond stones seen on the end of the right wall extend across the width of this tall, battered, dry-stone wall

A perpend stone, perpend (parpen, parpend, perpin, and other spellings), through stone, bond stone, or tie stone is a stone that extends through an entire wall's width, from the outer to the inner wall. Such stones are especially used to lock two wall layers structurally together. Usually stone walls are built with two layers of stone, an inner and an outer layer, with the space between them sometimes filled with rubble.

The term perpend is also used to refer to a joint in brickwork also called a cross joint or, when extending through the entire wall, a transverse joint or perpend bond.
