= Siege of Zaragoza =

Siege of Zaragoza or Siege of Saragossa may refer to:

- Siege of Caesaraugusta (542)
- Siege of Caesaraugusta (652)
- Siege of Zaragoza (754)
- Siege of Zaragoza (755)
- Siege of Zaragoza (777)
- Siege of Zaragoza (778)
- Siege of Zaragoza (778)
- Siege of Zaragoza (781)
- Siege of Zaragoza (1086)
- Conquest of Zaragoza (1118), in which the city fell to the Kingdom of Aragon
- Siege of Zaragoza (1808), in which the city's inhabitants resisted the French during the Peninsular War
- Siege of Zaragoza (1809), in which the city fell to the French during the Peninsular War

== See also ==
- Battle of Saragossa, a 1710 battle in the War of Spanish Succession
- Zaragoza Offensive, a 1937 offensive during the Spanish Civil War
